= Bhagalpur Airport =

- IATA: none; ICAO: none

Summary
- Airport type: Government
- Operator: Central Government
- Serves: Bhagalpur
- Location: Bhagalpur
- Elevation AMSL: 154 ft / 47 m
- Coordinates: 25°14′58.0″N 87°00′59.8″E

Map

Bhagalpur Airport is situated at Bhagalpur City, in the state of Bihar, India. The airport is located at an elevation of 154 feet (47 m) above mean sea level. The Jhunjhunwala family had taken the franchise of that airline of Kalinga Airways in Bhagalpur. That was during the period 1969-1971 when 36-seater Airways was served from Bhagalpur. Kunjbihari Jhunjhunwala, who runs the franchise.

Sadar DCLR Sanjay Kumar Sinha has instructed all the COs of the subdivision to send a proposal of 200 acres of land for the airport.

== See also ==
- Jay Prakash Narayan International Airport
- Darbhanga Airport
- Muzaffarpur Airport
- Gaya Airport
- Purnea Airport
- Raxaul Airport
