= List of airports in Bihar =

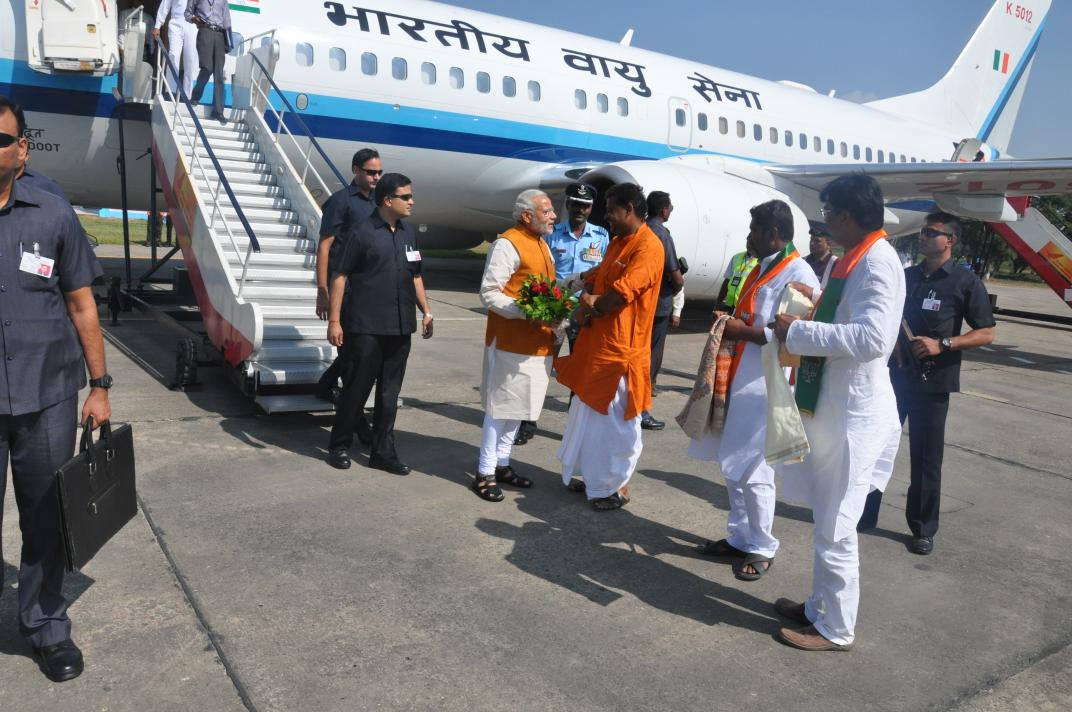
PM Narendra Modi at Darbhanga Airport

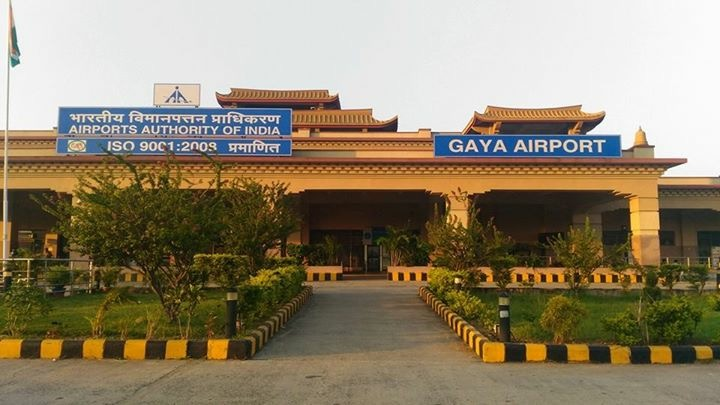
Gaya Ji Airport is located in the city Gaya in the state of Bihar, India.

Bihar, a state of India, has airports which have access to international flights, domestic and some non used airstrips for emergency purposes. All the airports in Bihar are operated by Airports Authority of India.

== List ==
The list includes domestic, military, and non-operational airports with their respective ICAO and IATA codes.

Area served	Airport name	IATA	ICAO	Airport type	Operational	Owned/operated by
Begusarai	Begusarai Airport	—	—	Domestic	Closed	Government of Bihar
Bhagalpur	Bhagalpur Airport	—	—	Domestic	Closed	Government of Bihar
Bihta	Bihta Air Force Station	—	—	Military	Operational	MoD
Birpur	Birpur Airport	—	—	Defence	Closed	Government of Bihar
Chhapra	Chapra Airport	—	—	Defence	Closed	Government of Bihar
Darbhanga	Darbhanga Airport	DBR	VEDH	International (CE)	Operational	MoD and AAI
Gaya	Gaya Airport	GAY	VEGY	International	Operational	AAI
Gopalganj	Sabeya Airport	—	—	Military	Closed	MoD
Katihar	Katihar Airport	—	—	Defence	Closed	Government of Bihar
Munger	Munger Airport	—	—	Domestic	Closed	Government of Bihar
Muzaffarpur	Muzaffarpur Airport	MZU	VEMZ	Domestic	Closed	AAI
Patna	Jay Prakash Narayan Airport	PAT	VEPT	International	Operational	AAI
Purnia	Purnia Airport	PXN	VEPU	International (CE)	Operational	MoD and AAI
Raxaul	Raxaul Airport	—	VERL	Domestic	Closed	AAI
Saharsa	Saharsa Airport	—	—	Domestic	Closed	Government of Bihar
