= Sabeya Airport =

Military airport in Bihar, India

- IATA: none; ICAO: none

Summary
- Airport type: Military
- Owner: Civil Aviation department, Govt of Bihar
- Serves: Gopalganj
- Location: Hathua
- In use: During World War II
- Elevation AMSL: 75 m (246 ft)
- Coordinates: 26°23′54.0″N 84°17′34.5″E

Map
- Location within Bihar Location within India

Sabeya Airport is a dysfunctional airport formally used for military and is located at Kandh Gopi Village in Gopalganj District, Bihar. It is situated 3 km (1.9 mi) from Hathua. It is under control of Defence Ministry of India. But here is not any military and forces. it is listed under UDAN scheme.

== History ==
It was built by Defence Ministry of British-India Government..770 acres (310 ha). It is very sensitive for defence because it is close to the China Border. It was used by British Air Force in World War II

== UDAN Scheme ==
The Government of India has sanctioned to start air service of 26 airport under regional connectivity scheme UDAN: it is under it. Recently Gopalganj MP raised question on it in Parliament. The Ministry of Civil Aviation (India) requested a report from the Defence Ministry. It is 10 km (6.2 mi) from Thawe (famous for Thawe Devi Temple), so it is important for tourism.

== Redevelopment ==
The airport is going to redevelop under UDAN scheme. Land has been hand over to Civil department and pre feasibility survey has been completed by Airport Authority of India. Airport tender and airline auction is likely to be announced in december 2026.

== See also ==
- Darbhanga Airport
- Gaya Airport
- Muzaffarpur Airport
- Purnea Airport
- Raxaul Airport
