= Begusarai Airport =

Airport in Begusarai, Bihar, India

Begusarai Airport Ulao Airport
- IATA: none; ICAO: none

Summary
- Airport type: Public
- Owner: Government of Bihar
- Serves: Begusarai
- Location: Begusarai, Bihar, India
- Elevation AMSL: 46 m / 150.9 ft
- Coordinates: 25°25′40″N 86°05′18″E

Map

Runways
Direction	Length		Surface
Direction	m	ft	Surface
10/28	770	2,527	Asphalt

Begusarai Airport (also known as Ulao Airport) is a small airport located in Begusarai, Bihar, India. The airport is located in the Begusarai district, near the banks of the river Ganga. The airport's owner is the Government of Bihar.

== History ==
Begusarai Airport is an airport that is located on the east side of Begusarai. There are no scheduled flights to and from this airport. There have been demands for air services from this airport but no work has been done by the Government of Bihar to start this airport.and no recuried space for airport The runaway of the airport is very short and expansion works would need to be carried out in order for larger aircraft to fly to the airport. In July 2022, V.K Singh from the Ministry of Civil Aviation clarified that the Begusarai Airport is included in the list of airports under the Udan Scheme, but no proposals have been received from airlines to start flight operations from the airport. It has also been proposed that a greenfield airport be built in Begusarai, but government officials have said there are no current plans to do so. Begusarai is a growing city in Bihar, and there are a large amount of industries located in the city. Many local business owners and industrialists have also been recently demanding to start air services from Begusarai as the city is expanding and to boost economic growth, an airport will be necessary. Several large corporations are located near the airport such as NTPC Limited, and Urvarak Nagar Barauni. The airport is also located near the Barauni Refinery which is owned by Indian Oil, and starting an airport would help further improve connectivity to industrial cities like Begusarai.

== See also ==
- List of airports in Bihar
- Jay Prakash Narayan Airport, Patna
- Darbhanga Airport
- Gaya Airport
