= Muzaffarpur Airport =

Airport in Muzaffarpur, Bihar, India

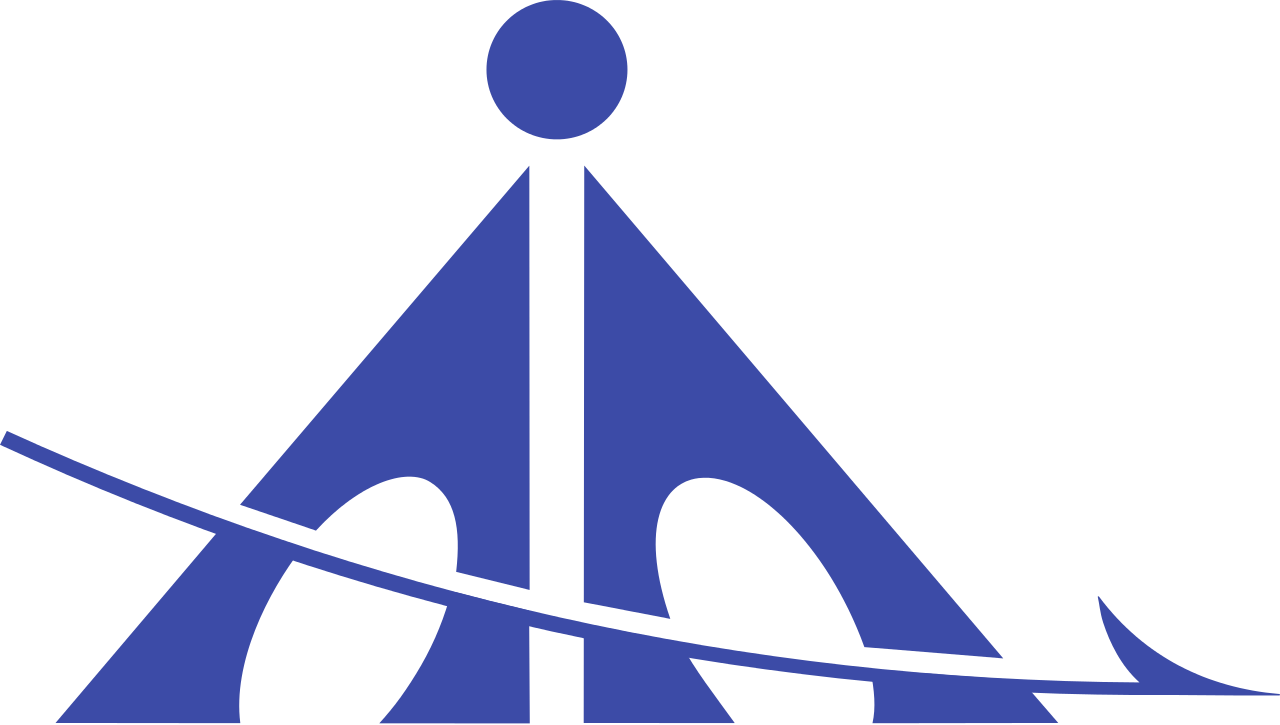
Muzaffarpur Airport Patahi Hawai Adda
- IATA: MZU; ICAO: VEMZ

Summary
- Airport type: Public
- Owner: Airports Authority of India
- Operator: Airports Authority of India
- Serves: Muzaffarpur
- Location: Patahi, Muzaffarpur, Bihar, India
- Elevation AMSL: 20 ft (6.1 m)
- Coordinates: 26.0336395°N 85.1355189°E

Map
- Airport in India VEMZ (India)

Runways
Direction	Length		Surface
Direction	ft	m	Surface
10/28	3,600	1,097

Muzaffarpur Airport (IATA: MZU, ICAO: VEMZ) is located in Muzaffarpur in the state of Bihar, India. The airport is situated at Patahi and is owned and operated by the Airports Authority of India (AAI).

The airport was originally constructed to facilitate the arrival of Indira Gandhi, the then Prime Minister of India. Between 1967 and 1982, the airport handled regular flight operations connecting Muzaffarpur with Patna.

== Pre Feasibility Study & Master Plan ==
- Feasibility of Proposal - Preliminary visual assessment indicates that operationalisation of Patahi Airport under ARC-2B and ARC-3C is technically feasible.
- Land Requirements - Operationalisation of Patahi Airport under ARC-2B will require no additional land from the State Government. However, for ARC-3C under VFR would require 228 acres of additional land, with a further 90 acres needed for upgradation to ARC-3C under IFR. This is subject to the favourable outcome of the OLS and LiDAR surveys, removal of obstacies, compliance with the observations of this report, GSR-751(E)/GSR-770(E), other statutory directives of the Government of India, NCAP-2016 of MoCA, and necessary clearances from the MoEF&CC and other relevant Ministries.
- Runway Characteristics - For ARC-2B - Runway 11/29 of 1050m x 30m having suitable PCR value at the location of existing brick runway. For ARC-3C - Runway 11/29 of 1800m x 45m having suitable PCR value at the location of runway proposed in the Master Plan document, shared with State Govt. vide AAl letter dated 24 May 2024.
- Airspace - VFR operations at Patahi Airport appears to be feasible considering the current airspace classification and surrounding terrain conditions. The design and implementation of Instrument Flight Procedures (IFPs) appears to be technically feasible at Patahi Airport. However, an OLS survey needs to be carried out for the final assessment of feasibility of IFP.
- Site Surroundings & Site Topography - OLS survey would require to be conducted to identify existing obstacles that need to be removed, lowered, or marked to ensure safe operations and also to create a series of surfaces that define the airspace around the airport, including approach and departure surfaces, transitional surfaces, and horizontal surfaces.

== UDAN Scheme Expansion in Bihar ==
The Government of India approved the operation of small aircraft services from seven cities in Bihar under the UDAN (Ude Desh ka Aam Naagrik) regional connectivity scheme to enhance air connectivity and promote regional development.

To support the initiative, the central government allocated approximately ₹190 crore for the development and operationalisation of airports at Birpur, Supaul, Saharsa, Madhubani, Munger, Muzaffarpur (Patahi Airport), Purnia and Valmikinagar.

The airport infrastructure development is being executed by the Airports Authority of India, and a memorandum of understanding (MoU) is to be signed between the Bihar state government and AAI for project implementation.

== See also ==
- Darbhanga Airport
- Gaya Airport
- Jay Prakash Narayan International Airport
- Purnea Airport
- Raxaul Airport
