= Munger Airport =

Airport in Munger, Bihar, India

- IATA: none; ICAO: VAMG

Summary
- Airport type: Public
- Owner: Government of Bihar
- Serves: Munger
- Location: Munger, Bihar, India
- Elevation AMSL: 49 m / 161 ft
- Coordinates: 25°20′47″N 086°28′59″E

Map

Runways
| Direction | Length | | Surface |
| Direction | m | ft | Surface |
|---|---|---|---|
| 10/28 | 768 | 2,522 | Asphalt |

Munger Airport (also known as Safyabad Airport) is an airport located in Munger district in the Indian state of Bihar. The airport is situated at Saifabad, 5 km from the district headquarters of Munger. It is controlled by the Airports Authority of India.

== History ==
Munger airport is 90 years old. In January 2015, then Chief Minister of the state, Jitan Ram Manjhi announced to develop the airport and start domestic flights. In March 2015, airport renovation work was given to Bihar Rajya Bhavan Nirmaan Nigam. Airport renovation was done at the cost of ₹ 8 crore. Renovated airport lounge and runway was inaugurated by Chief Minister Nitish Kumar on 24 May 2016.

== See also ==
- List of airports in Bihar
