= Indira Gandhi International Airport =

International airport serving Delhi, India

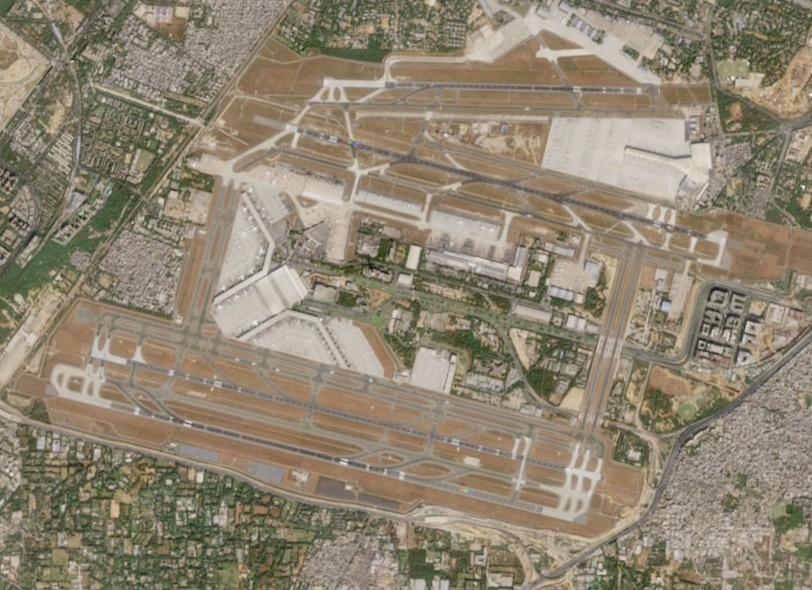
- Satellite image of the airport
- IATA: DEL; ICAO: VIDP; WMO: 42181

Summary
- Airport type: Public
- Owner: Airports Authority of India
- Operator: Delhi International Airport Limited (DIAL): GMR Group (74%); Airports Authority of India (26%)
- Serves: National Capital Region
- Location: Palam, Delhi, India
- Opened: 1962; 64 years ago
- Hub for: Air India; Alliance Air; FedEx Express; Quikjet Airlines
- Focus city for: New Delhi, India
- Operating base for: Air India Express; IndiGo; SpiceJet
- Elevation AMSL: 778 ft (237 m)
- Coordinates: 28°34′07″N 077°06′44″E
- Public transit access: Airport Express IGI Airport; Magenta Line Terminal 1 IGI Airport
- Website: www.newdelhiairport.in

Map
- Location of airport in India DEL/VIDP (India)

Runways
Direction	Length		Surface
Direction	m	ft	Surface
09/27 (Note: Runway 09 is 2,816 m (9,239 ft) and 27 is 2,664 m (8,740 ft) with a displaced threshold of 152 m (499 ft). Thus aircraft landing on runway 27 will have to avoid touching down on the displaced threshold but may use it for departures.)	2,816	9,239	Asphalt
10/28	3,813	12,510	Asphalt
11R/29L (Note: Runway 11R is 3,790 m (12,434 ft) with a displaced threshold of 640 m (2,100 ft), and 29L is 2,970 m (9,744 ft) with a displaced threshold of 1,460 m (4,790 ft). Thus, aircraft landing on 11R or 29L will have to avoid touching down on the displaced threshold, but may use it for departures.)	4,430	14,534	Asphalt
11L/29R	4,400	14,436	Asphalt

Statistics (April 2025 – March 2026)
- Passengers: 78,701,971 (▼0.7%)
- International passengers: 21,549,460 (▼0.1%)
- Aircraft movements: 473,540 (▲1%)
- Cargo tonnage: 1,148,337.6 (▲3.5%)
- Source: AAI, AIM India/ eAIS Package

Indira Gandhi International Airport (IATA: DEL, ICAO: VIDP; sometimes IGI or IGI Airport; known as Palam Airport until 1986) is the primary international airport serving New Delhi, the capital of India, and the National Capital Region (NCR). The airport, spread over an area of 5,106 acres (2,066 ha), is situated in Palam, Delhi, 15 km (9.3 mi) southwest of New Delhi railway station and 16 km (9.9 mi) from the city centre.

Named after Indira Gandhi (1917–1984), the former Prime Minister of India, it is the busiest airport of India in terms of passenger traffic since 2009. It is also the busiest airport in the country in terms of cargo traffic. In FY 2024–25, the airport handled over 79.2 million (7.92 crore) passengers, the highest ever in the airport's history. As of 2025, it is the ninth-busiest airport in the world, as per the latest rankings issued by the UK-based air consultancy firm OAG. It is the second-busiest airport in the world by seating capacity, having a seating capacity of over 3.6 million (36 lakh) seats, and the third-busiest airport in Asia, handling over 77.8 million (7.78 crore) passengers in 2024. It is routinely ranked as one of the busiest airports in the world by the Airports Council International.

Established by the British during the Second World War as RAF Palam, the airport served as a staging ground for Allied aerial efforts in Asia. After India achieved its independence, the Indian Air Force assumed operational management of the airport. It remained under their control before its management was eventually transferred to the Airports Authority of India. In May 2006, control of the airport was subsequently entrusted to Delhi International Airport Limited (DIAL), a consortium led by the GMR Group.

In September 2008, the airport inaugurated a 4,430 m (14,530 ft) runway. With the commencement of operations at Terminal 3 in 2010, it became both India's and South Asia's largest aviation hub; Terminal 3 has the capacity to handle 34 million (3.4 crore) passengers annually and was the world's 8th-largest passenger terminal upon completion. The airport inaugurated a 4,400 m (14,400 ft) runway and the 2.1 km (1.3 mi) eastern cross taxiways (ECT) with dual parallel taxiways in July 2023. IGI uses an advanced system called airport collaborative decision making (A-CDM) to help keep takeoffs and landings timely and predictable.

The other two airports serving the region are Hindon Airport and Noida International Airport. Hindon primarily handles regional and domestic flights to major metro cities under the UDAN scheme, while Noida was built to offset the burgeoning air traffic of the region. Safdarjung Airport, which used to be the primary airport of Delhi, is now mainly used by VVIP helicopters due to security reasons.

== History ==
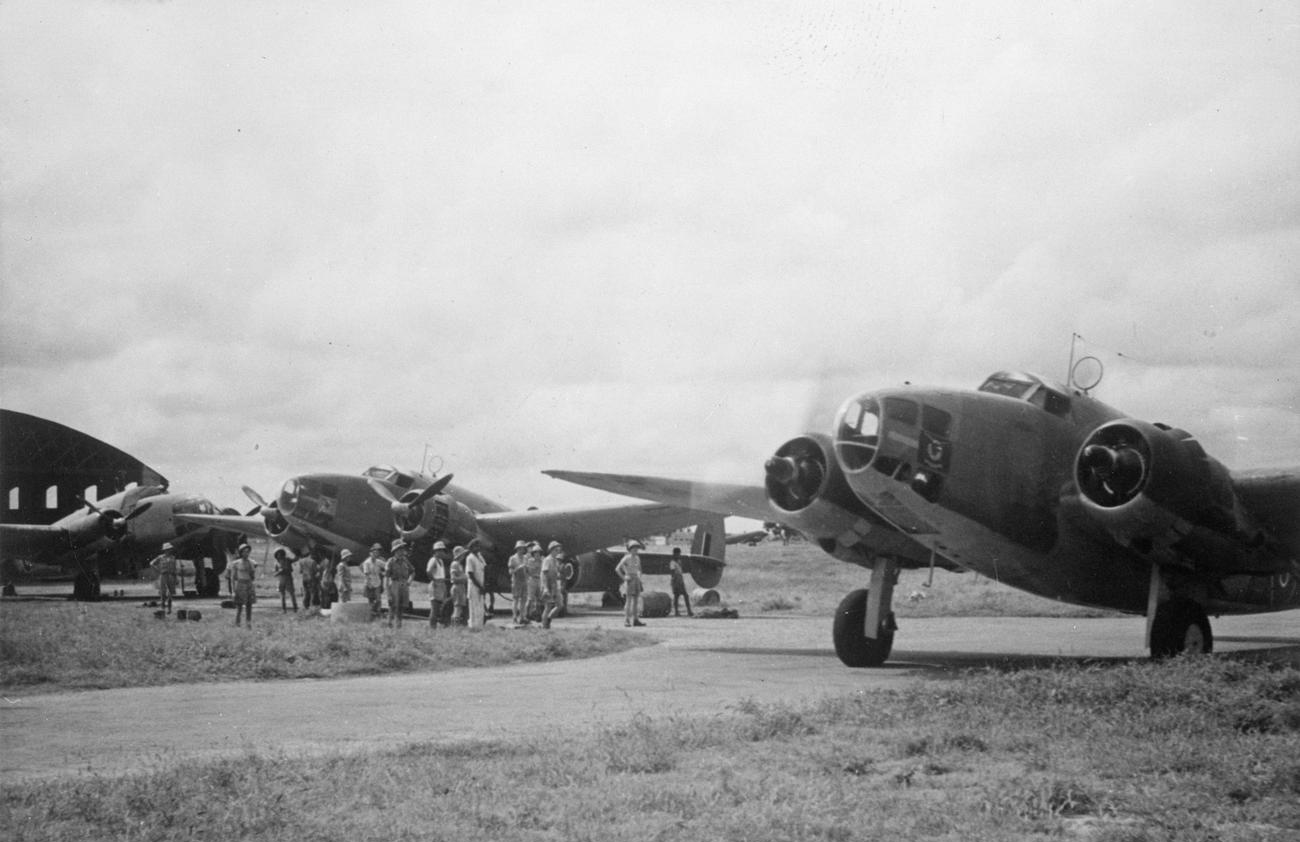
Lockheed Hudson Mark VI of No. 194 Squadron RAF at RAF Station Palam

Palam Airport, known as RAF Palam when established, was the precursor to the modern-day Indira Gandhi International Airport. Founded in 1943 during the Second World War by the imperial British government to support Allied military operations in Asia, it served as a staging ground for Royal Air Force flights. After the British withdrawal from India, the Royal Indian Air Force, which was later rechristened as the Indian Air Force, took over the airport.

In 1962, commercial passenger operations were relocated from Safdarjung Airport (Delhi's first airport) to Palam Airport. At that time, Palam had a peak capacity of approximately 1,300 passengers per hour. In 1979–80, a total of 30 lakh (3 million) domestic and international passengers flew into and out of Palam Airport. Owing to an increase in air traffic in the '70s and '80s, an additional terminal with nearly four times the area of the old Palam terminal was constructed. On 2 May 1986, with the inauguration of the new international terminal, designated Terminal 2, the airport was renamed Indira Gandhi International Airport.

In October 2001, Canada 3000 commenced a flight to Toronto. This was the first nonstop service between India and North America. Russia's decision to open its airspace after the Cold War allowed the airline to save time by flying a direct route over the Arctic. Even though the September 11 attacks had precipitated a global decline in air travel, Canada 3000 was hoping that the service would help it improve its financial position. Nevertheless, the company collapsed one month later.

Significant growth in the Indian aviation industry led to a major increase in passenger traffic. The capacity of Terminal 1 was estimated to be 71.5 lakh (7.15 million) passengers per annum (mppa). The actual throughput for 2005/06 was an estimated 1.04 crore (10.4 million) passengers. Including the then closed down international terminal (Terminal 2), the airport had a total capacity of 1.25 crore (12.5 million) passengers per year, whereas the total passenger traffic in 2006/07 was 1.65 crore (16.5 million) passengers per year. In 2008, the total passenger count at the airport reached 2.4 crore (23.97 million). To ease the traffic congestion on the existing terminals and in preparation for the 2010 Commonwealth Games, a much larger Terminal 3 was constructed and inaugurated on 3 July 2010. The new terminal's construction took 37 months for completion and this terminal increased the airport's total passenger capacity by 34 million.

Apart from the two budget domestic airlines handled by Terminals 1 and 2, all other airlines operate their flights from Terminal 3. In June 2022, Delhi International Airport became India's first to run entirely on hydropower and solar energy.

== Ownership ==
On 31 January 2006, the aviation minister Praful Patel announced that the empowered Group of Ministers agreed to sell the management-rights of Delhi Airport to the DIAL consortium and the Mumbai Airport to the GVK Group. On 2 May 2006, the management of Delhi and Mumbai airports were transferred over to the private consortia. At the time of ownership transfer, Delhi International Airport Limited (DIAL) was a consortium consisting of the GMR Group (54%), Fraport (10%) and Malaysia Airports (10%); the Airports Authority of India held a 26% stake.

In May 2015, Malaysia Airports chose to exit from DIAL venture and sold its 10% stake to GMR Infra for $79 million. Following this move, GMR Group's stake in DIAL increased to 64%. In 2024, Fraport sold its 10% shareholding to GMR Group.

== Facilities ==
VIDP Airport Map

=== Runways ===
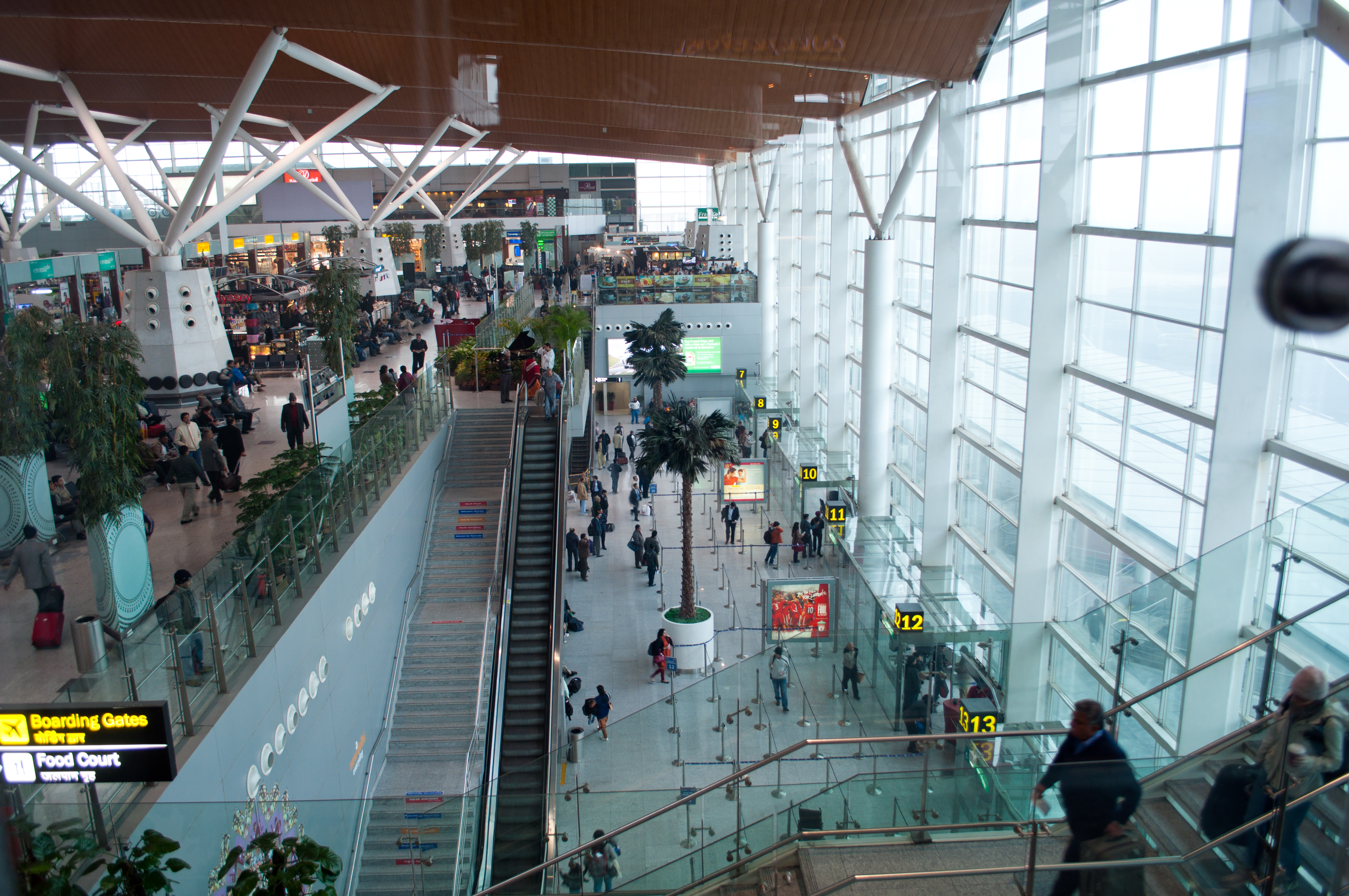
Interior of the domestic departures terminal

Runways at IGI Airport
Runway number	Length	Width	Approach lights/ILS
11R/29L	4,430 m (14,530 ft)	60 m (200 ft)	CAT III-B / CAT II
11L/29R	4,400 m (14,400 ft)	45 m (148 ft)	CAT III-B / CAT II
10/28	3,813 m (12,510 ft)	46 m (151 ft)	CAT I / CAT III-B
09/27	2,816 m (9,239 ft)	45 m (148 ft)	CAT I / CAT I

Delhi Airport has four near-parallel runways: runway 11R/29L, 4,430 m × 60 m (14,530 ft × 200 ft), runway 11L/29R, 4,400 m × 45 m (14,436 ft × 148 ft), runway 10/28, 3,813 m × 46 m (12,510 ft × 151 ft), and runway 09/27, 2,816 m × 45 m (9,239 ft × 148 ft). The 09/27 runway of the Delhi Airport was the airport's first-ever runway; the British constructed the 2,816 metre-long and 60 metre-wide runway in the pre-independence era and used it during World War II. Delhi Airport is one of the six airports in India whose runways are equipped with CAT III-B ILS, alongside Lucknow, Jaipur, Amritsar, Bengaluru and Kolkata.

The initially proposed mode involving simultaneous takeoffs in westerly flow to increase handling traffic capacity caused several near misses over the west side of the airport where the centrelines of runways 10/28 and 9/27 intersect.

On 21 August 2008, the airport inaugurated its third runway, 11R/29L, costing ₹1,000 crore and 4,430 m (14,534 ft) long. The runway has one of the world's longest paved threshold displacements of 1,460 m (4,790 ft). This, in turn decreases the available landing length on runway 29L to 2,970 m (9,744 ft). The reason for the long threshold displacement is the presence of a 263 m high Shiv statue, which is located near runway 29L. The runway increased the airport's capacity to handle up to 100 flights from the previous 45–60 flights per hour. The new runway was opened for commercial operations on 25 September 2008 and gradually began full round-the-clock operations by the end of October of the same year.

Since 2012, all three runways have been operated simultaneously to handle traffic during day hours. Only runways 11R/29L and 10/28 are operated during night (2300–0600 IST) hours with single runway landing restriction during westerly traffic flow that is rotated late night (0300 IST) and reversed weekly to distribute and mitigate night time landing noise over nearby residential areas.

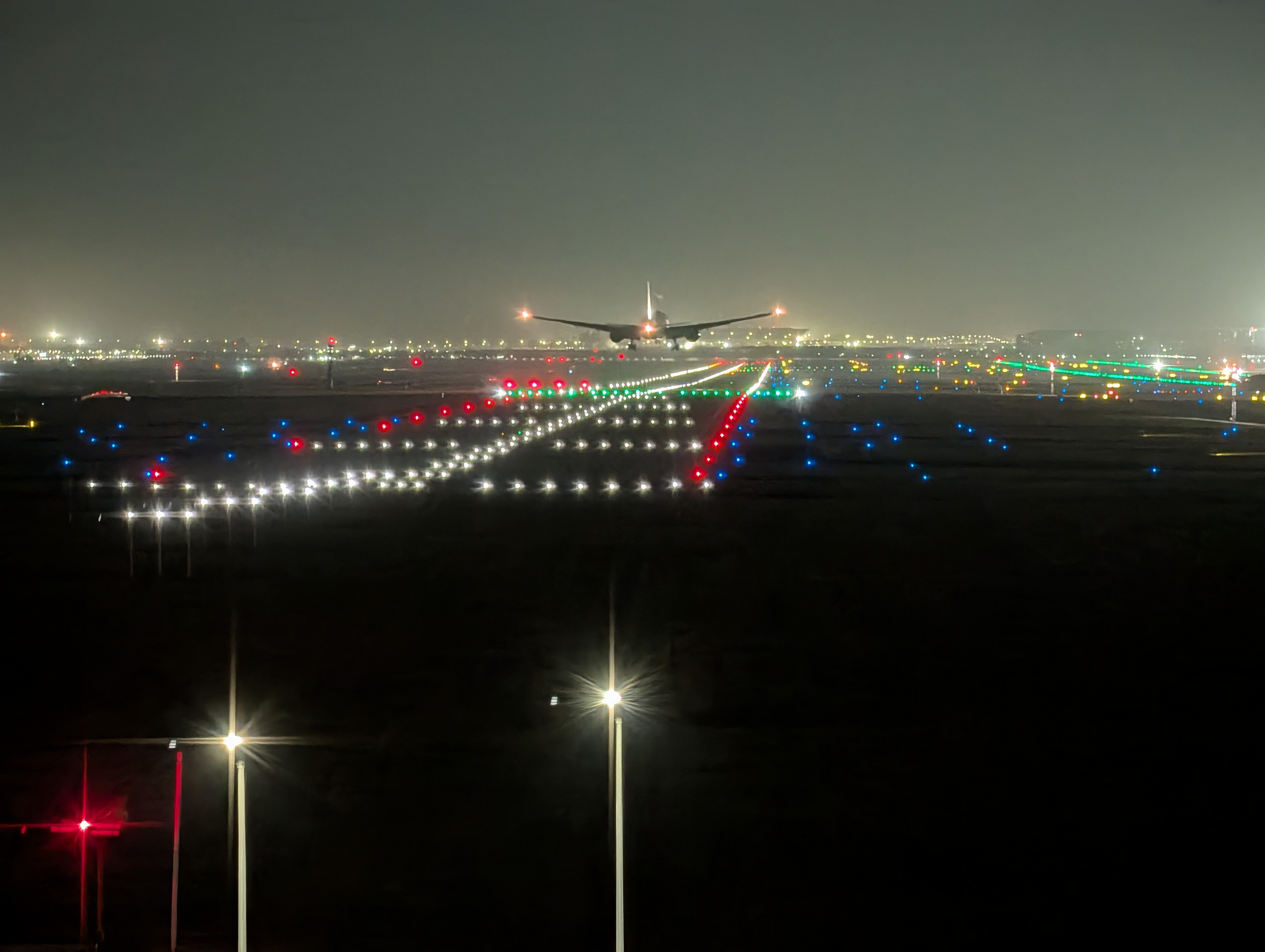
Cathay Pacific Boeing 777-300ER moments before touchdown at Indira Gandhi International Airport's Runway 29R

To accommodate the demand for growing air traffic, the master plan for the construction of a fourth parallel runway next to the existing runway 11R/29L was cleared in 2017. along with the Eastern Cross Taxiways (ECT) - a pair of elevated parallel taxiways linking the northern part of the airport with the southern runways. It will be elevated as it will pass over the airport approach roads. It will be 2.1 km (1.3 mi) long and both the taxiways will be 44 m (144 ft) wide, with a 47 m (154 ft) wide gap separating the taxiways, making it capable of handling Airbus A380 and Boeing 747 type aircraft. It will help flights reducing duration to reach the southern runways from 9–10 minutes to only two minutes, as well as reducing pollution and traffic. The fourth runway and the ECT was inaugurated on 14 July 2023.

== Terminals ==
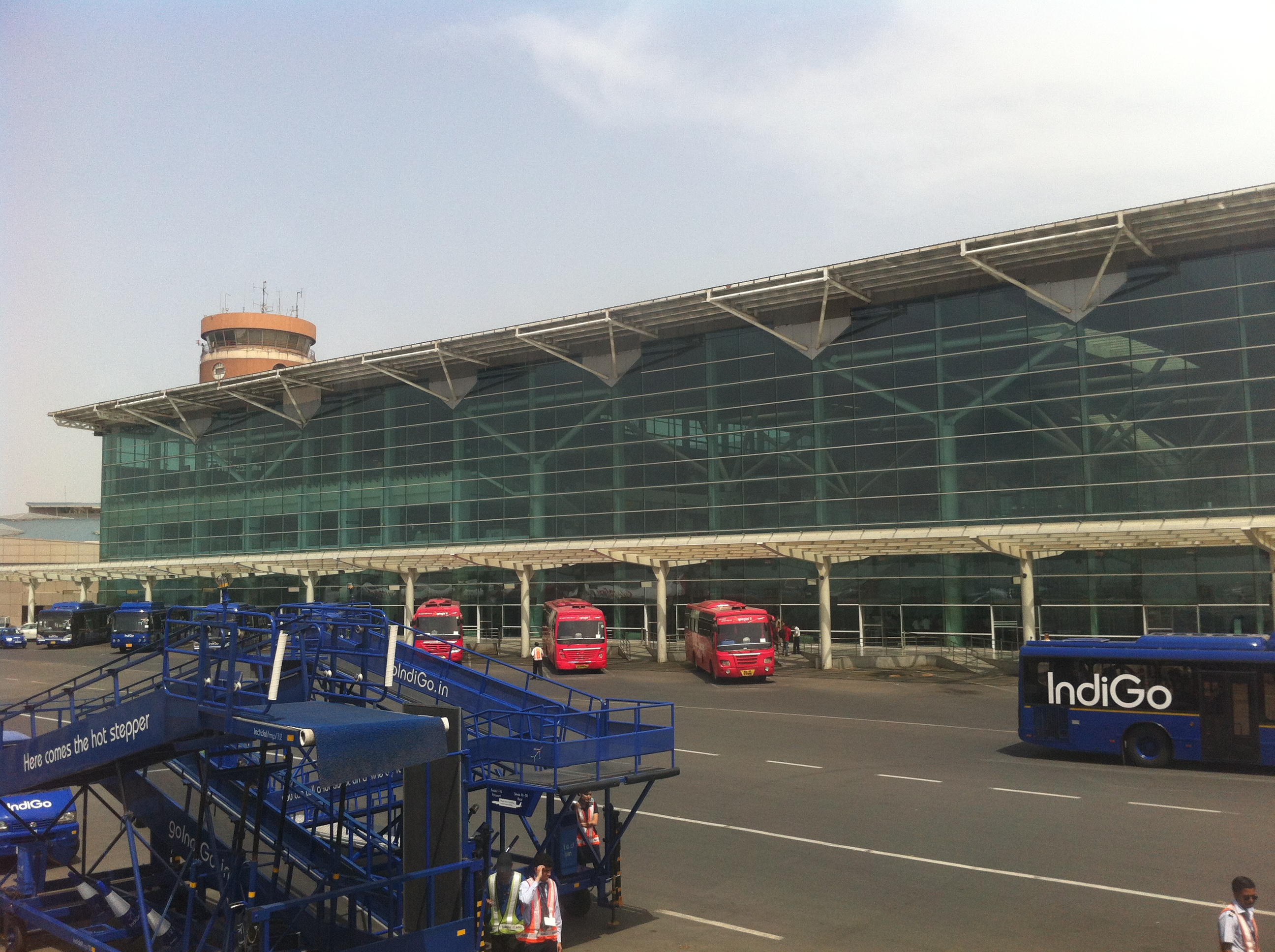
Terminal 1D at Indira Gandhi International Airport

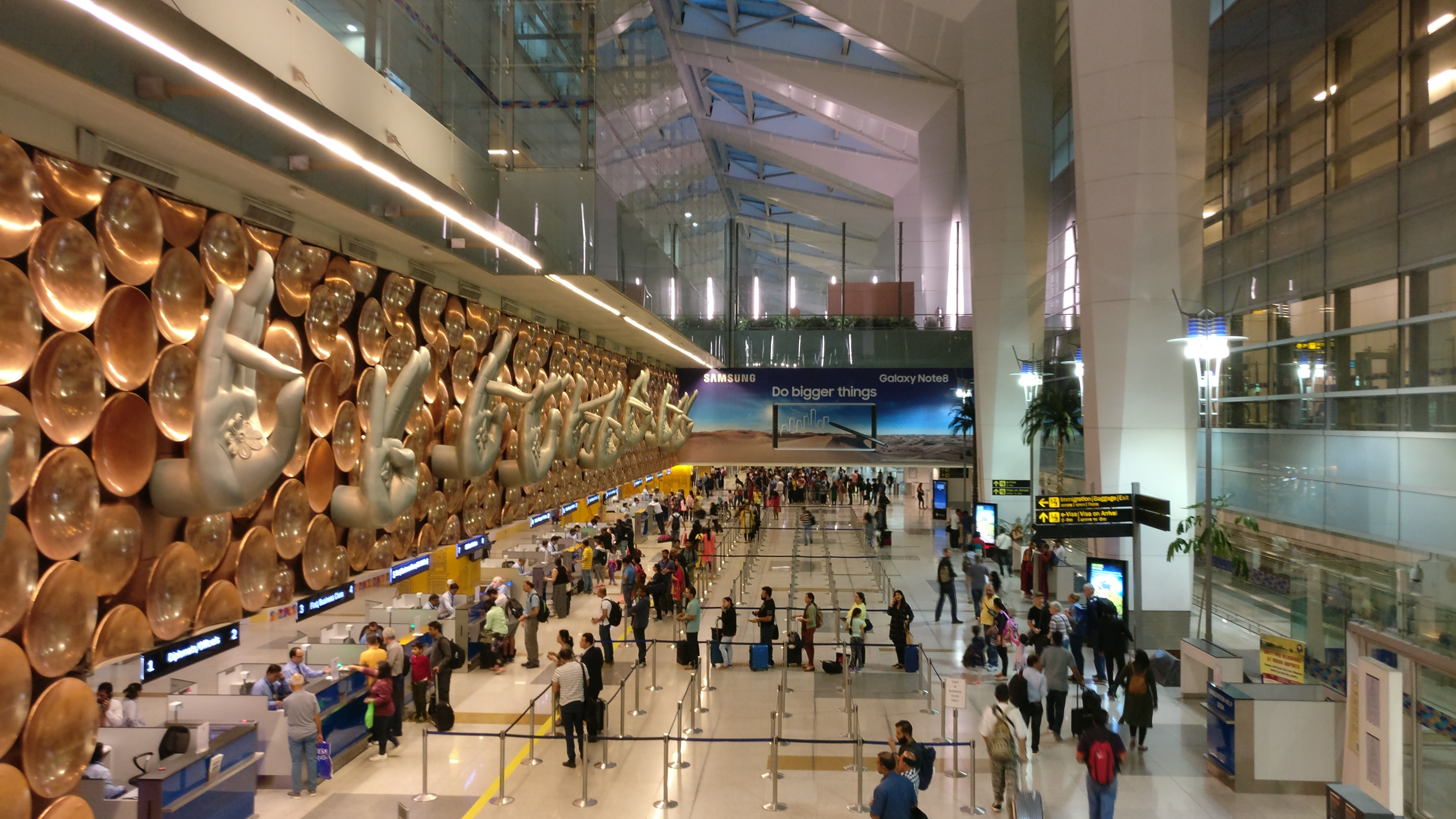
Inside view of Terminal 3 at Indira Gandhi International Airport

=== Currently operational terminals ===
==== Terminal 1 ====
Terminal 1 is used by the low cost domestic carriers, such as SpiceJet and IndiGo. In 2022, Terminal 1D underwent a full expansion, incorporating an arrivals hall, with the aim of increasing its annual passenger handling capacity from 1.8 crore (18 million) to 4 crore (40 million).

In 2025, after an extensive redevelopment program, Terminal 1 reopened following major renovations and an expansion featuring a distinctive guitar-neck-shaped pier. The terminal now operates as a single integrated building, encompassing the former Terminal 1A through 1D areas.

==== Terminal 2 ====
Terminal 2 was inaugurated on 1 May 1986, at a cost of ₹95 crores, and initially served international flights until July 2010, when operations were moved to Terminal 3. Following this, the terminal remained operational for only three months annually, catering to Hajj flights. In 2017, after a revamp costing ₹100 crores, DIAL shifted all GoAir operations and select IndiGo operations to Terminal 2, allowing for continued expansion work at Terminal 1. As of October 2025, all Terminal 2 renovations are complete and it is open for operations.

==== Terminal 3 ====
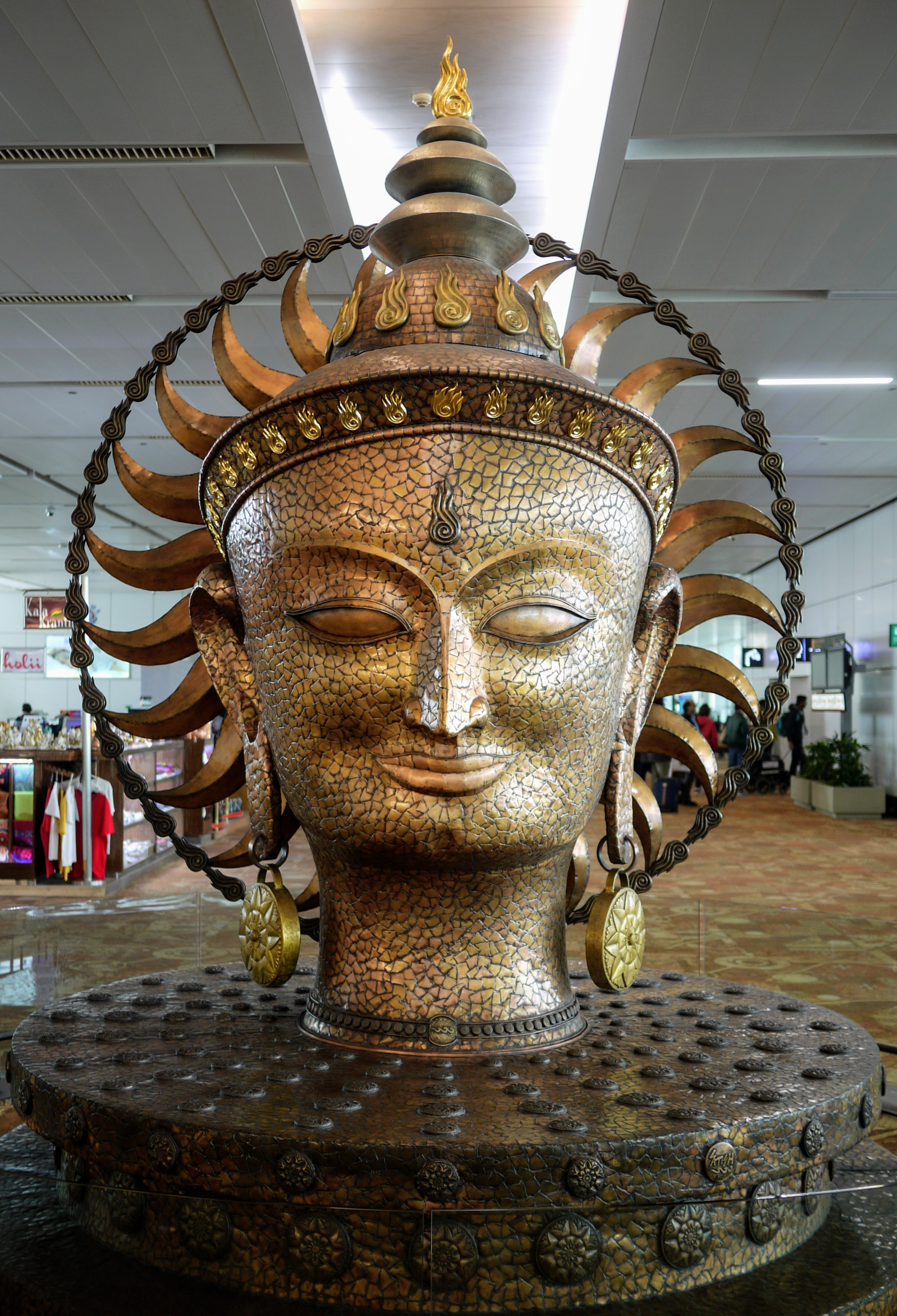
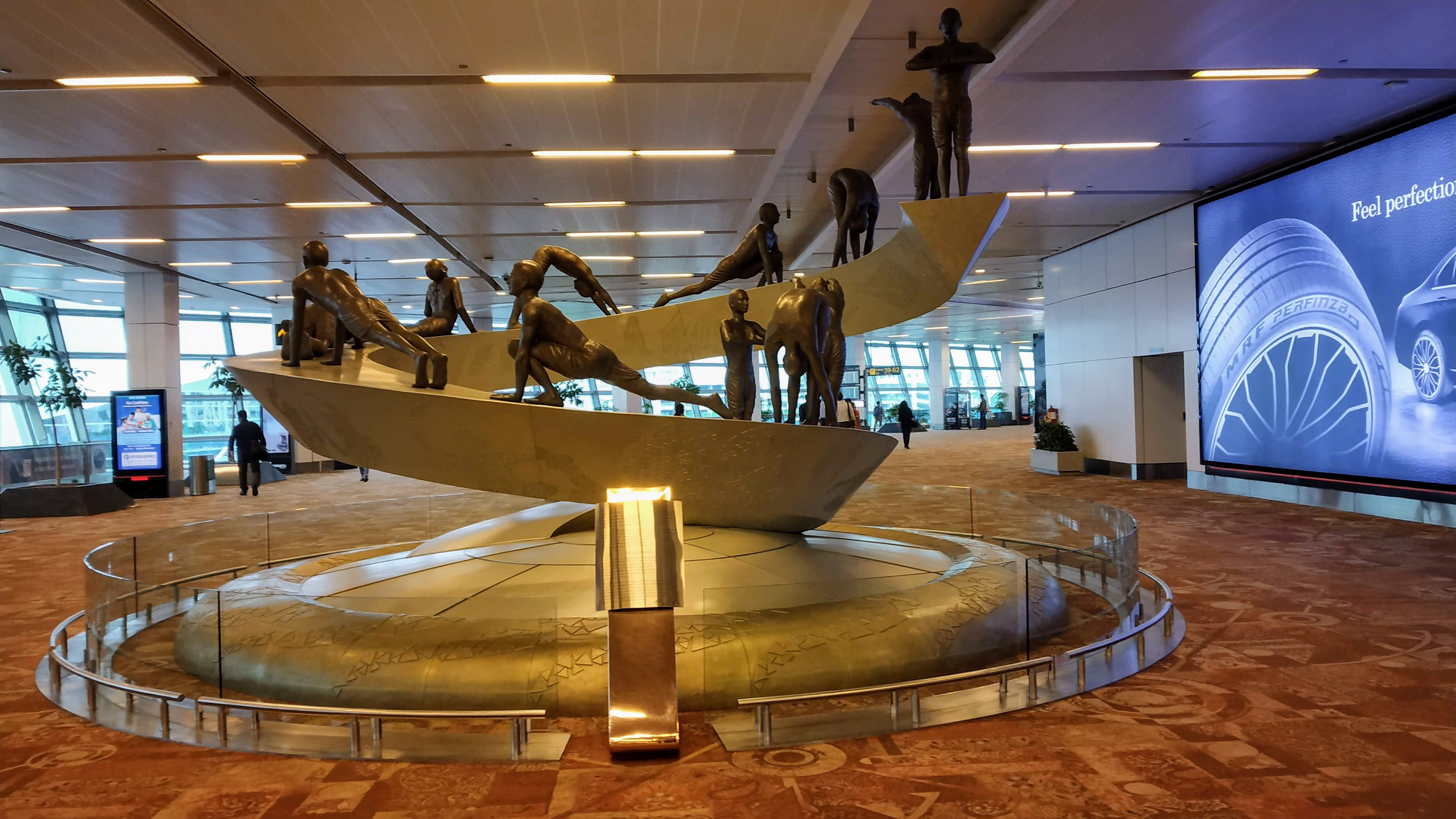
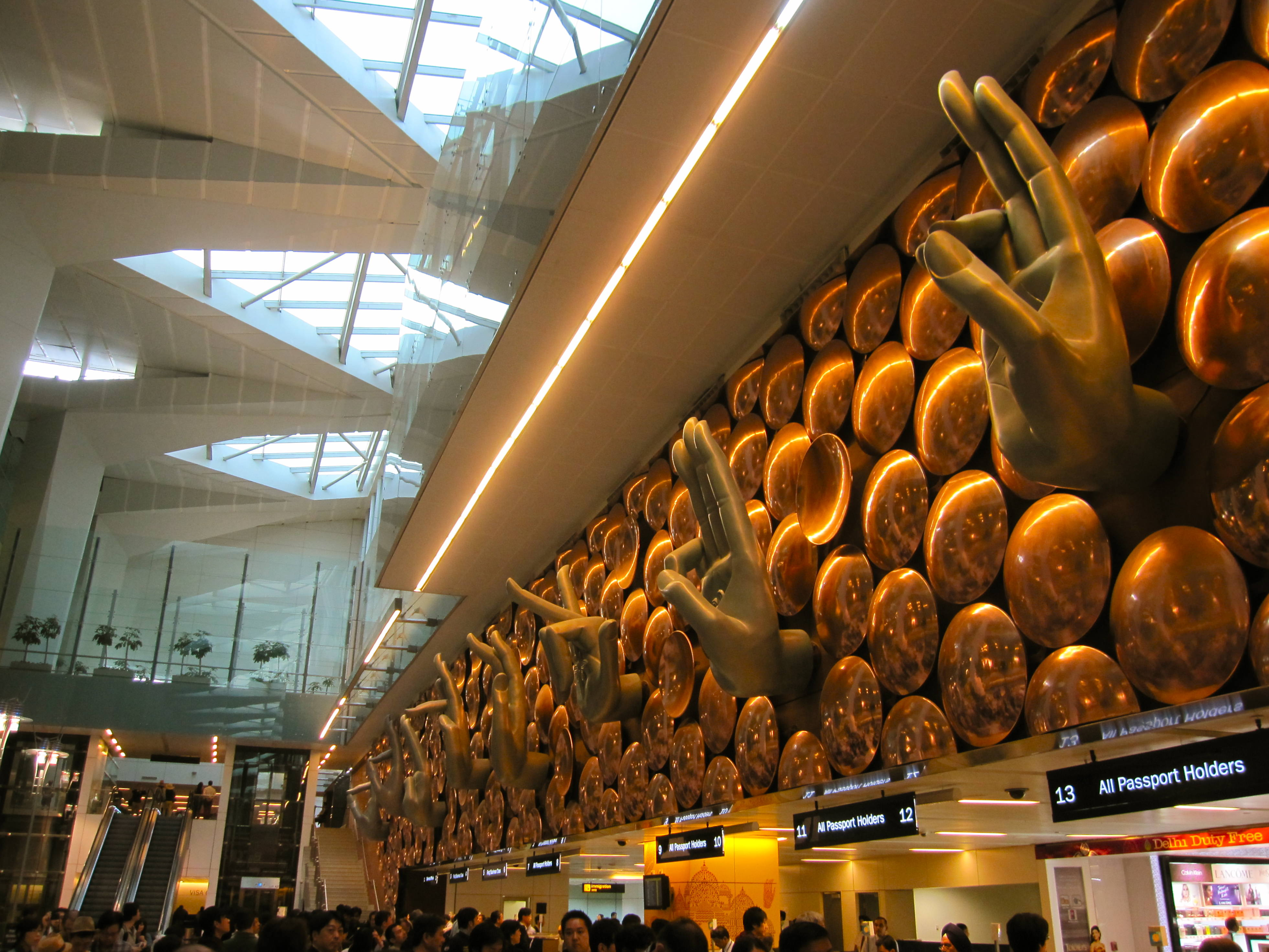
Sculptures in Terminal 3: Hindu solar deity Surya (upper left), Surya Namaskara asanas (upper right), and hasta mudras or hand gestures extending from a wall over the immigration counters (bottom)

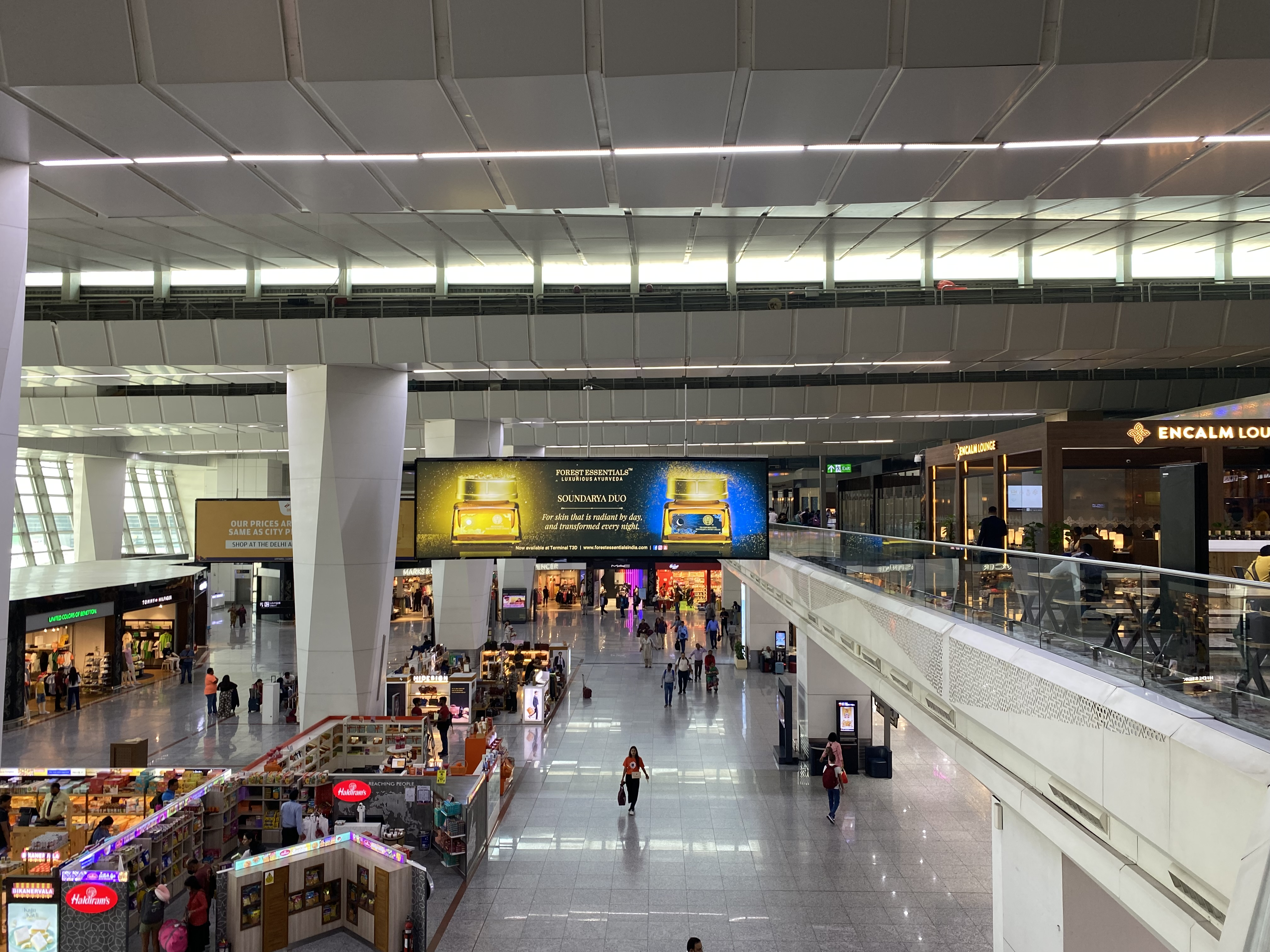
Interior of Terminal 3

Designed by HOK working in consultation with Mott MacDonald, Terminal 3 is a two-tier building spread over an area of 6,400,000 square feet (594,579 m^{2}), making it the 8th largest terminal in the world. It was officially inaugurated on 3 July 2010. All international airlines shifted their operations to the new terminal in late July of the same year, whereas all full service domestic carriers followed suit in November 2010. The terminal consists of two levels: the lower floor serves as the arrivals area, while the upper floor is designated for departures. This terminal has 168 check-in counters, 78 aerobridges at 48 contact stands, 54 parking bays, 95 immigration counters, 18 X-ray screening areas, and duty-free shops.

International flights depart from gates 1–26 (gates 2, 4, 6 are bus gates) and the domestic flights leave from gates 27–62 (gates 42, 44 are bus gates)

Terminal 3 forms the first phase of the airport expansion which tentatively includes the construction of additional passenger and cargo terminals (Terminal 4, 5, and 6).

Domestic full-service airline Air India operates from Terminal 3.

On 16 December 2024, the Indira Gandhi International airport became the first in India to connect directly to 150 airports or destinations—both domestic and international—with the launch of a Thai AirAsia X direct flight between Delhi and Bangkok's Don Mueang airport.

==== General Aviation Terminal ====
India's first general aviation terminal was commissioned in this airport in September 2020. The terminal caters to support the movement and processing of passengers flying through chartered flights or private jets from the airport.

==== Air cargo complex ====
The air cargo complex is located at a distance of 1 km (0.62 mi) from Terminal 3. It consists of separate brownfield and greenfield cargo terminals. The cargo operations at the brownfield terminal are managed by Celebi Delhi Cargo Management India Pvt. Ltd., which is a joint venture between Delhi International Airport Private Ltd (DIAL) and the Turkish company Celebi Ground Handling (CGH). CGH was awarded the contract to develop, modernise, and finance the existing cargo terminal and to operate the terminal for a period of twenty-five years by DIAL in November 2009. It started its operations in June 2010. In addition to the existing terminal, a new greenfield terminal is being developed in phases by Delhi Cargo Service Centre (DCSC), also a joint venture between DIAL and Cargo Service Center (CSC). The greenfield cargo terminal project consists of two terminals built over a plot of 48,000 square metres and 28,500 square metres, respectively. Phase 1A of the project has been completed and is fully operational. Once the entire project is completed, these two new terminals will have an annual handling capacity of 12.5 lakh (1.25 million) tonnes. The cargo operations of the airport received "e-Asia 2007" award in 2007 for "Implementation of e-Commerce / Electronic Data Interchange in Air Cargo Sector".

=== Previous terminals ===
==== Terminal 1A ====
Terminal 1A was built in 1982 as a temporary structure for international VIPs arriving for the 1983 Commonwealth Heads of Government Meeting held in Delhi. After the event, the building remained unused until Indian Airlines started operating Airbus A320 operations in 1988. It had to be refurbished after a fire gutted the interiors in October 1996 and DIAL significantly upgraded the terminal. The terminal was closed after Air India shifted operations to the new Terminal 3 on 11 November 2010. DIAL had previously intended to repurpose the terminal for Haj operations and charter planes; however, this proposal never materialised. The terminal lay unused until 2018, when DIAL decided to demolish it.

==== Terminal 1C ====
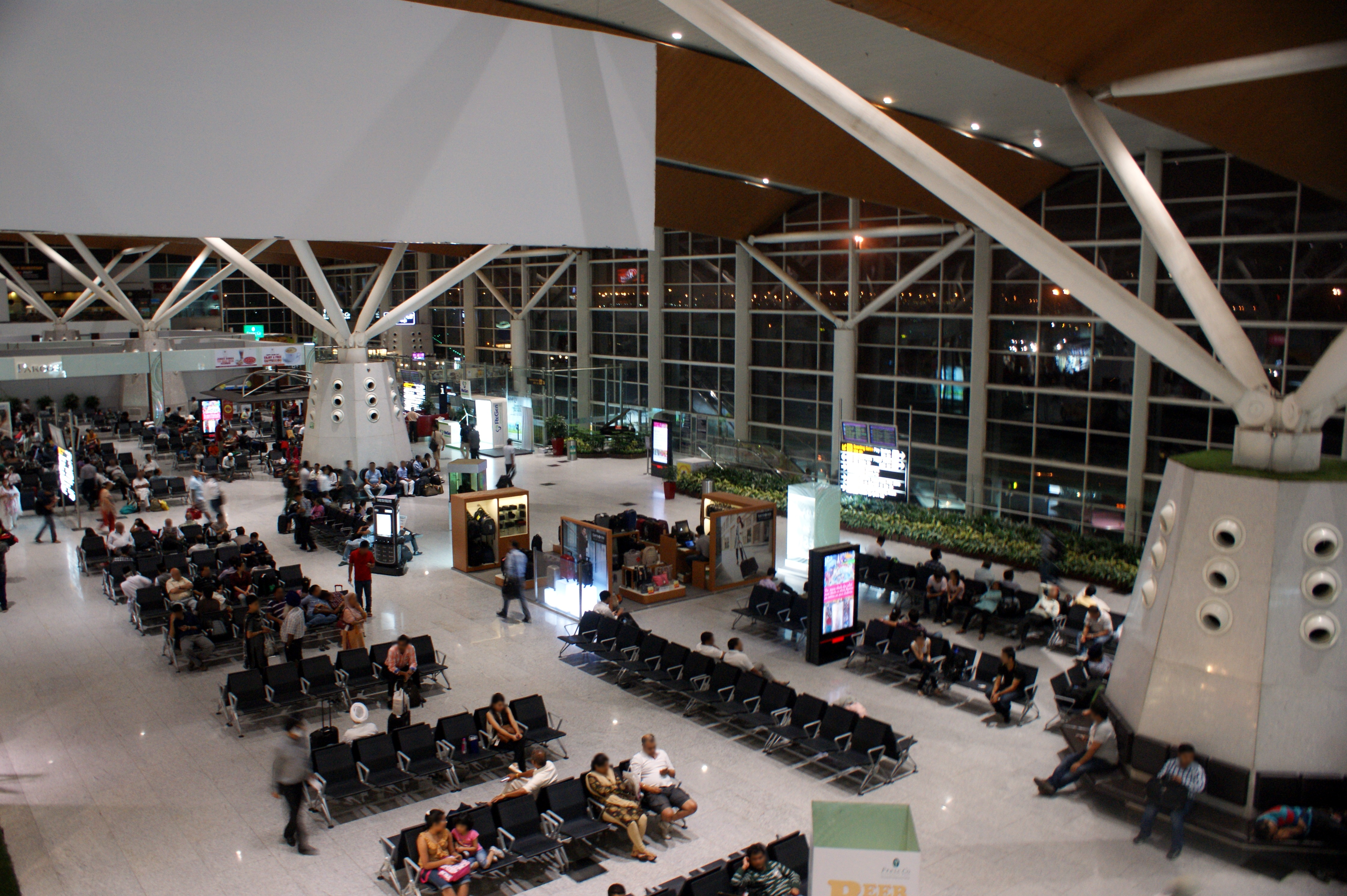
Interior of Terminal 1D

==== Terminal 1D ====
Terminal 1D was developed by DIAL and inaugurated on 27 February 2009 as a domestic departures terminal with a total floor space of 53,000 m^{2} (570,000 sq ft) and a capacity to handle 1.5 crore (15 million) passengers per year. The terminal commenced operations on 19 April 2009. It had 72 Common Use Terminal Equipment (CUTE) enabled check-in counters, 16 self check-in counters, and 16 security channels.

== Airlines and destinations ==
=== Passenger ===
Airlines	Destinations
Aero Nomad Airlines	Bishkek
Aeroflot	Moscow–Sheremetyevo
Air Algérie	Algiers (begins 26 October 2026)
Air Arabia	Sharjah
Air Astana	Almaty
Air Cambodia	Phnom Penh
Air Canada	Toronto–Pearson; Seasonal: Montréal–Trudeau
Air China	Beijing–Capital
Air France	Paris–Charles de Gaulle
Air India	Ahmedabad, Amritsar, Amsterdam, Aurangabad, Bangkok–Suvarnabhumi, Bengaluru, Bhopal, Bhubaneswar, Bhuj, Birmingham, Chandigarh, Chennai, Chicago–O’Hare, Coimbatore, Colombo–Bandaranaike, Dehradun, Denpasar, Dhaka, Doha, Dubai–International, Frankfurt, Gaya, Goa–Dabolim, Goa–Mopa, Guwahati, Hanoi, Ho Chi Minh City, Hong Kong, Hyderabad, Indore, Jaipur, Jaisalmer, Jeddah, Kathmandu, Kochi, Kolkata, Kuala Lumpur–International, Leh, London–Heathrow, Lucknow, Ludhiana, Malé, Manila, Melbourne, Milan–Malpensa, Mumbai–Shivaji, Nagpur, New York–JFK, Newark, Osaka–Kansai (begins 2 February 2027), Paris–Charles de Gaulle, Patna, Phuket, Port Blair, Prayagraj, Pune, Raipur, Rajkot, Riyadh, Rome–Fiumicino, San Francisco, Seoul–Incheon, Shanghai–Pudong, Singapore, Srinagar, Sydney, Tel Aviv (resumes 1 December 2026), Thiruvananthapuram, Tokyo–Haneda, Toronto–Pearson, Udaipur, Vadodara, Vancouver, Varanasi, Vienna, Vijayawada, Visakhapatnam, Yangon, Zurich
Air India Express	Abu Dhabi, Ahmedabad, Amritsar, Aurangabad, Ayodhya, Bagdogra, Bengaluru, Bhopal, Bhubaneswar, Dammam, Goa–Dabolim, Goa–Mopa, Guwahati, Imphal, Jaipur, Jammu, Jodhpur, Kochi,Kuwait City, Lucknow, Mangaluru, Mumbai–Navi, Mumbai–Shivaji, Patna, Port Blair, Pune, Ranchi, Riyadh, Sharjah, Srinagar, Surat, Udaipur, Varanasi
Air Mauritius	Mauritius
AirAsia X	Kuala Lumpur–International
Akasa Air	Ahmedabad, Ayodhya, Bagdogra, Bengaluru, Darbhanga, Goa-Mopa, Gorakhpur, Hyderabad, Kolkata, Mumbai–Navi, Mumbai–Shivaji, Pune, Srinagar, Visakhapatnam (begins 25 October 2026)
All Nippon Airways	Tokyo–Haneda
Alliance Air	Ambikapur, Bathinda, Bilaspur, Chandigarh, Daman, Dehradun, Dharamshala, Gorakhpur, Hisar, Indore, Jabalpur, Jaipur, Kullu, Pithoragarh, Prayagraj, Shimla
American Airlines	New York–JFK
Ariana Afghan Airlines	Kabul
Azerbaijan Airlines	Baku
Batik Air Malaysia	Kuala Lumpur–International
Belavia	Minsk
Bhutan Airlines	Kathmandu
British Airways	London–Heathrow
Cathay Pacific	Hong Kong
Centrum Air	Tashkent
China Eastern Airlines	Shanghai–Pudong
China Southern Airlines	Guangzhou
Drukair	Paro
Egyptair	Cairo
Emirates	Dubai–International
Ethiopian Airlines	Addis Ababa
Etihad Airways	Abu Dhabi
EVA Air	Taipei–Taoyuan (begins 1 December 2026)
Finnair	Helsinki
flydubai	Dubai–International
Flynas	Riyadh
FlyOne	Tashkent (begins 6 November 2026)
Gulf Air	Bahrain
Hunnu Air	Ulaanbaatar
IndiGo	Amritsar, Athens, Aurangabad, Ayodhya, Baku,Denpasar, Bangkok–Suvarnabhumi, Belgaum, Bengaluru, Bikaner, Bhopal, Bhubaneshwar, Chennai, Coimbatore, Colombo-Bandaranaike, Dammam, Darbhanga, Dehradun, Denpasar Deoghar, Dhaka, Dharamshala, Dibrugarh, Dimapur, Doha, Dubai–International, Durgapur, Gaya, Goa–Dabolim, Goa–Mopa, Gorakhpur, Guangzhou, Guwahati, Gwalior, Hanoi, Hong Kong, Hubli, Istanbul, Itanagar, Jaisalmer, Jeddah, Jharsuguda, Kannur, Kanpur, Kathmandu, Khajuraho, Krabi, Kuala Lumpur–International, Kuwait City, London–Heathrow, Manchester, Mumbai–Navi, Mumbai–Shivaji, Nashik, Purnea, Pantnagar, Patna, Phuket, Rajkot, Riyadh, Singapore, Tiruchirappalli, Vijayawada
Iraqi Airways	Baghdad, Basra
ITA Airways	Rome–Fiumicino
Japan Airlines	Tokyo–Haneda, Tokyo–Narita
Jazeera Airways	Kuwait City
Kam Air	Kabul
KLM	Amsterdam
Korean Air	Seoul–Incheon
Kuwait Airways	Kuwait City
LOT Polish Airlines	Warsaw–Chopin
Lufthansa	Frankfurt, Munich
Mahan Air	Tehran–Imam Khomeini
Malaysia Airlines	Kuala Lumpur–International
Myanmar Airways International	Yangon
Nepal Airlines	Kathmandu
Oman Air	Muscat
Philippine Airlines	Manila (resumes 15 December 2026)
Qantas	Melbourne
Qatar Airways	Doha
Royal Jordanian	Amman–Queen Alia
Saudia	Jeddah, Riyadh
Singapore Airlines	Singapore
Somon Air	Dushanbe
SpiceJet	Ahmedabad, Bagdogra, Bengaluru, Darbhanga, Dharamshala, Gorakhpur, Guwahati, Jammu, Kolkata, Leh, Mumbai–Shivaji, Patna, Pune, Shillong Varanasi
SriLankan Airlines	Colombo–Bandaranaike
Swiss International Air Lines	Zürich
Thai AirAsia X	Bangkok–Don Mueang
Thai Airways International	Bangkok–Suvarnabhumi
Thai Lion Air	Bangkok–Don Mueang
Turkmenistan Airlines	Ashgabat
United Airlines	Newark
Ural Airlines	Yekaterinburg (begins 27 October 2026)
Uzbekistan Airways	Namangan, Tashkent
VietJet Air	Hanoi, Ho Chi Minh City
Vietnam Airlines	Hanoi, Ho Chi Minh City
Virgin Atlantic	London–Heathrow

=== Cargo ===
Airlines	Destinations
AeroLogic	Leipzig/Halle
Air Central	Zhengzhou
Astral Aviation	Sharjah
Atlas Air	Hong Kong
Blue Dart Aviation	Ahmedabad, Bengaluru, Hyderabad, Kolkata
Cathay Cargo	Hong Kong
China Airlines Cargo	Luxembourg,
Emirates SkyCargo	Brussels Airport,
FedEx Express	Al Maktoum International Airport, Guangzhou
Hong Kong Air Cargo	Hong Kong
IndiGo CarGo	Bengaluru, Mumbai,
Korean Air Cargo	Seoul–Incheon,
Qatar Cargo	Doha
SF Airlines	Chengdu–Shuangliu, Ezhou, Guangzhou, Shenzhen, Zhuhai
Sichuan Airlines Cargo	Chengdu–Shuangliu
SpiceXpress	Leh
Tianjin Air Cargo	Guiyang
UPS Airlines	Cologne/Bonn, Dubai–International, Shenzhen, Taipei

== Statistics ==
Passenger traffic at Indira Gandhi International Airport (2025–2026)
Month	2025	2026	Change (%)
January	6,903,650	7,228,717	+4.7%
February	6,717,405	6,960,382	+3.6%
March	7,016,092	7,001,938	−0.2%
April	6,674,293	6,652,190	−0.3%
May	6,249,600	7,166,161	+14.7%
June	6,162,643	6,579,442	+6.8%
July	5,813,181	6,027,269	+3.7%
August	5,924,765	6,083,616	+2.7%
January–August total	51,461,629	53,699,635	+4.3%

== Connectivity ==
=== Public transport ===
==== Metro rail ====
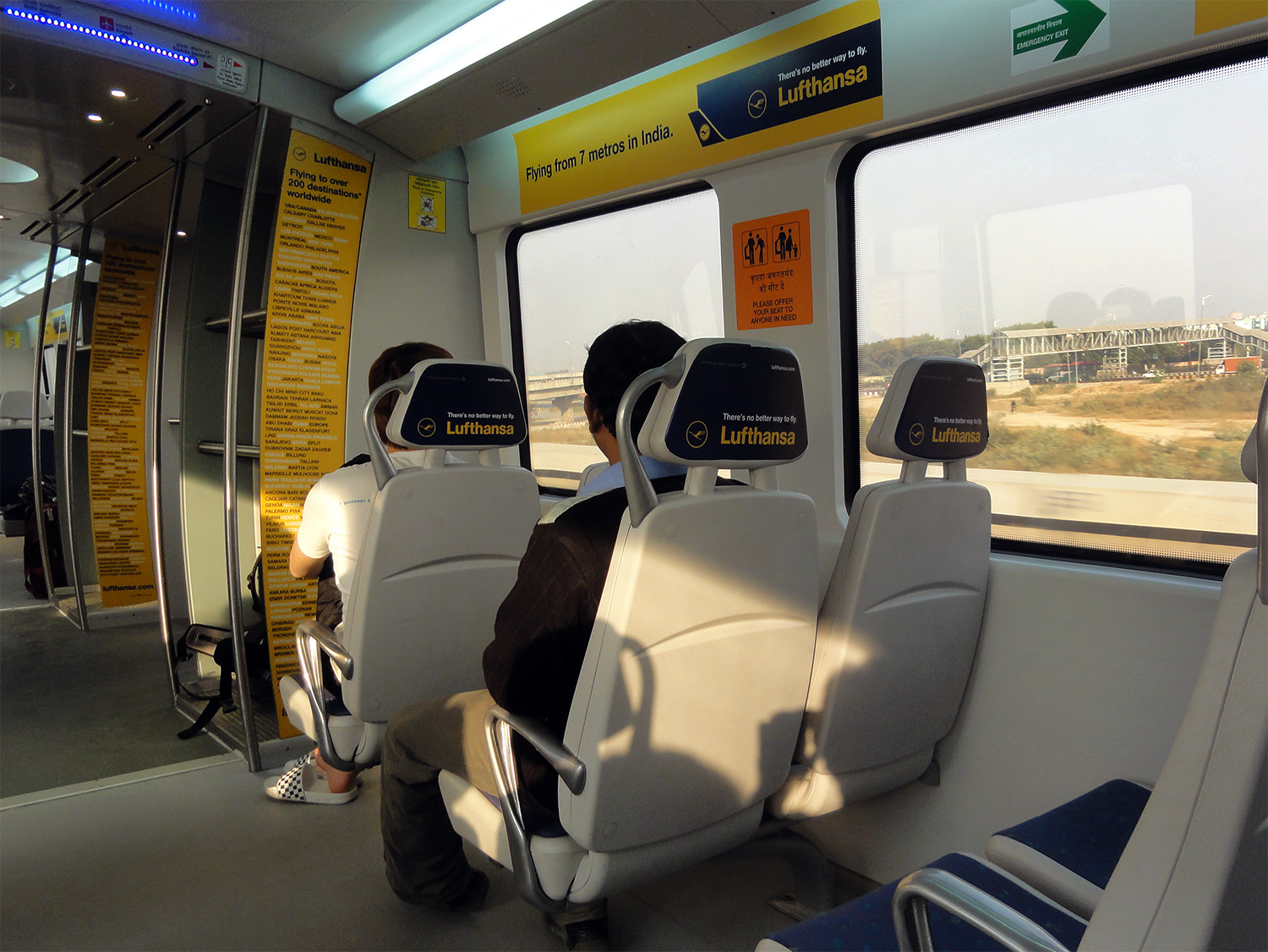
Delhi Metro Airport Express Train

Terminal 1 in the northeast corner of IGI Complex is served by the Terminal 1-IGI Airport metro station on the Magenta Line of Delhi Metro.

Terminal 2 and Terminal 3 are co-located in the southwest. Both are served by the same IGI Airport metro station on the Airport Express Line. The Airport Express Line runs from New Delhi metro station—which connects to the Yellow Line and New Delhi railway station of Indian Railways network—to the Dwarka Sector 21 metro station. The latter connects to the Blue Line, Bijwasan railway station, and the Dwarka ISBT Bus Terminal. The metro service runs every 10 minutes.

The Delhi Aerocity metro station serves its namesake, Aerocity, a sprawling commercial aerotropolis located to the immediate southeast of the airport. Located on the Airport Express Line, it will become a major interchange station upon the completion of the Golden Line in December 2026, which runs from Tughlaqabad in the southeast to Terminal 1 in the west.

==== Railways ====
Bijwasan railway station, located immediately to the west of IGI on the Delhi–Jaipur line, is currently undergoing major redevelopment to transform it into a regional multimodal transport hub. Although construction for the ₹270.83 crore project began in 2022, it is yet to become operational despite the original schedule for completion in 2024.

The planned Hisar International Airport-IGI Airport line (HIAIGI Line) has received the assent of the Government of Haryana and will directly connect IGI Airport with Hisar Airport in Haryana.

Another smaller station near IGI on the Delhi–Jaipur line is the Palam railway station, located north of Bijwasan station and northeast of IGI, 4.8 kilometres (3.0 mi) and 12 kilometres (7.5 mi) from Terminals 1 and 3 respectively. Several suburban passenger trains run regularly between these stations.

==== Bus ====
Air-conditioned, low-floor buses operated by Delhi Transport Corporation provide scheduled, recurring, and regular public transit services between the airport and the city.

As of 2024, two Inter-State Bus Terminals are under construction to serve long-haul bus routes at IGI Airport:

- Aerocity Inter State Bus Terminus (Aerocity ISBT), proposed in 2023, will be located adjacent to the Aerocity Metro Interchange Station near Terminal 1 of IGI Airport, within the IGI complex. Construction is currently underway.
- The Dwarka Inter-State Bus Terminus, located adjacent to and west of Dwarka Sector 21 metro station, is being constructed on 27 acres of land, with work commencing in 2022. The terminus will primarily cater to buses from Haryana and Punjab.

==== Taxis ====
Metered taxis are also available from the airport to all areas of the National Capital Region.

==== Air train ====
In September 2024, DIAL first issued tenders for the construction of an elevated and at-grade automated people mover (APM) system, with an expected completion date by the end of 2027. Per this tender, the 7.7 km line was supposed to feature four stops: T2/3, T1, Aerocity, and Cargo City. The 2024 proposal was floated to be implemented under the design, build, finance, operate, and transfer (DBFOT) model.

Following a poor response to the previous tender solicitation process (only a single bid was received), the DIAL announced in May 2026 that it would fund the project itself at an expenditure ranging between ₹3,000-4,000 crores. Construction is estimated to last for 30 months (or 2029). While connecting passengers will be able to travel aboard for free, others will have to pay a nominal fare. Upon implementation, this APM system would be the maiden one operational in India.

=== Roads and expressways ===
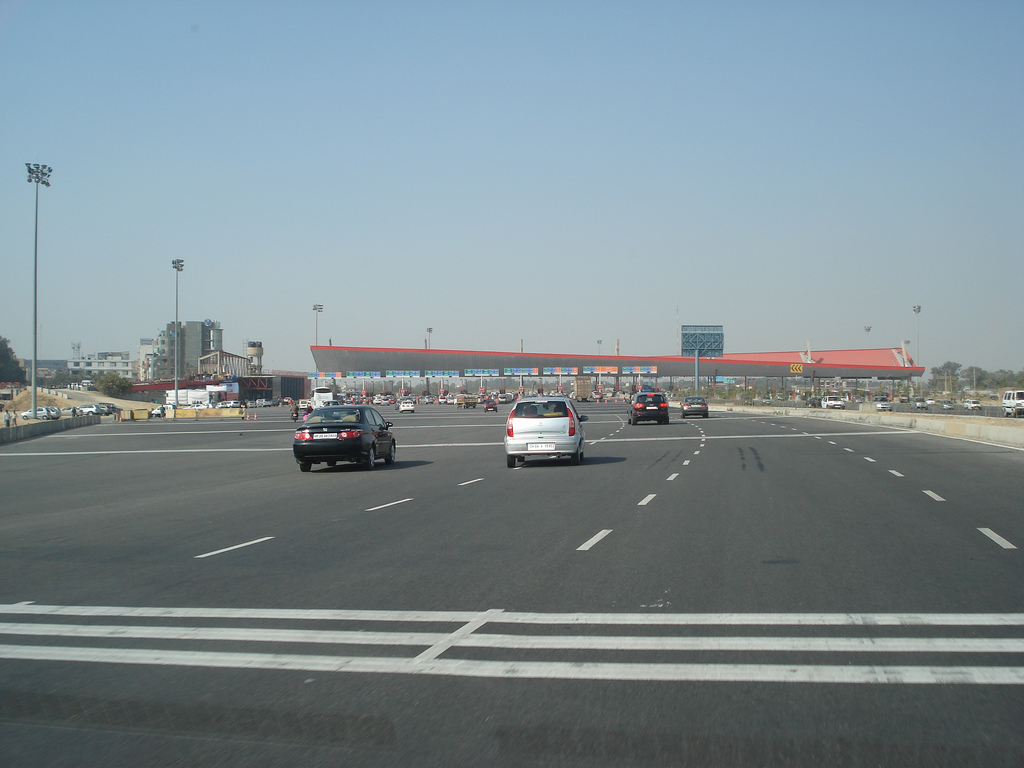
Delhi-Gurgaon Expressway

The airport is situated in South Delhi, close to the Haryana state border. It is connected to Delhi to the north and Gurgaon in Haryana to the south by two major expressways, each with eight lanes. The first, the Delhi–Gurgaon Expressway (NH 48), is 27.7 km long and runs at ground level, passing through Gurgaon. This expressway, part of the Delhi-Jaipur National Highway, is the older and busier route. The second, the Dwarka Expressway (NH-248BB), is a 26.7 km long elevated expressway that runs to the west of Gurgaon.

Urban Extension Road-II (UER II) is a 75.7 km-long, six-lane expressway that connects IGI Airport to the southern, southwestern, and western suburbs of Delhi. It also provides access to the Delhi-Hisar NH-9. It straddles the southern fringes of the airport.

== Awards ==
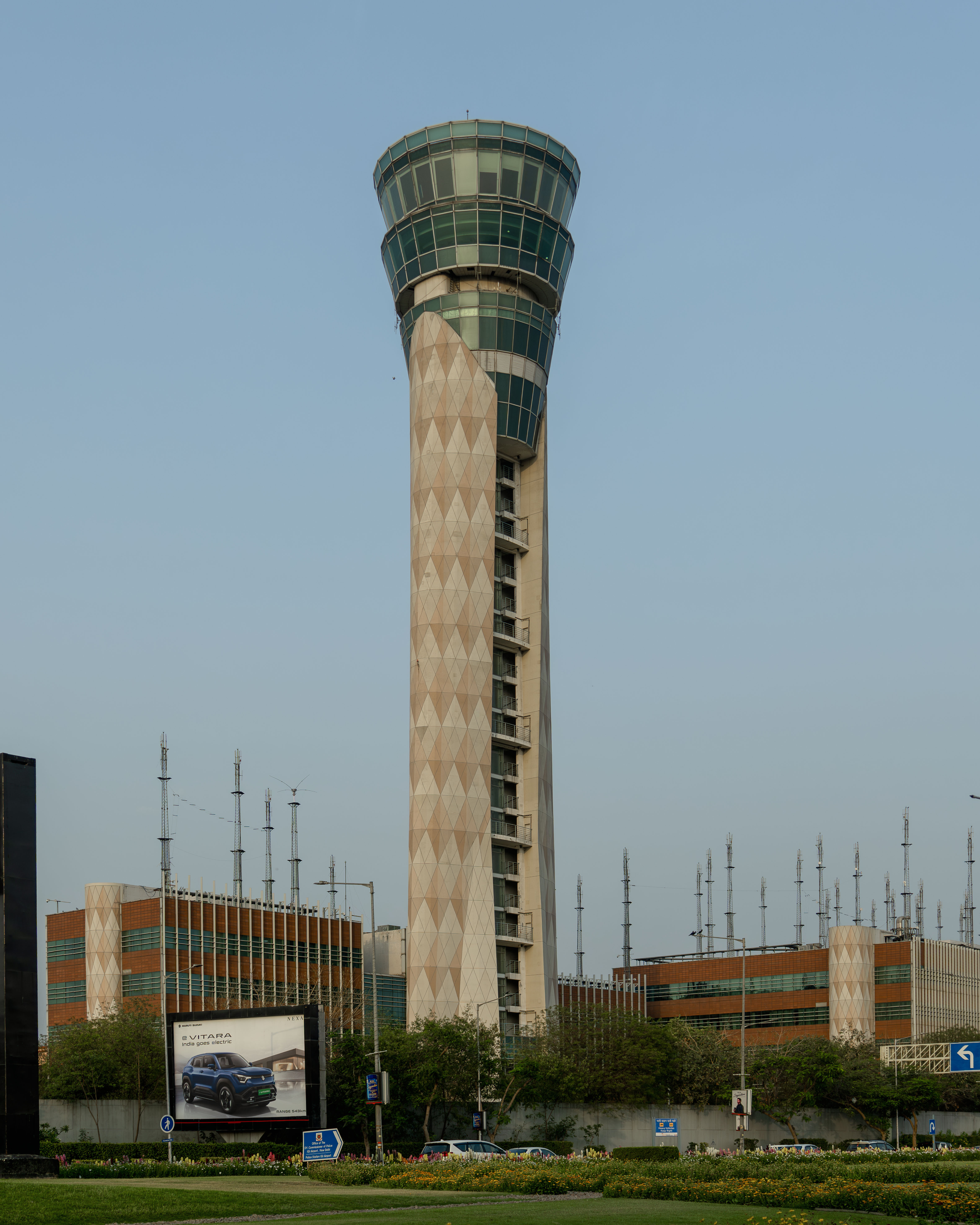
Air traffic control tower

In 2010, IGIA was conferred the fourth best airport award in the world in the 1.5–2.5 crore (15–25 million) category, and Most Improved Airport in the Indo-Pacific Region by Airports Council International. The airport was rated as the Best Airport in the world in the 2.5–4 crore (25–40 million) passengers category in 2015, by Airports Council International. It was awarded The Best Airport in Central Asia and Best Airport Staff in Central Asia at the Skytrax World Airport Awards 2015. It also stood first in the new rankings for 2015 Airport Service Quality (ASQ) Awards conducted by Airports Council International.

The airport, along with Mumbai Airport, was adjudged as the "World's Best Airport" at the Airport Service Quality Awards 2017, in the highest category of airports handling more than 4 crore (40 million) passengers annually. The airport was awarded the "best airport" in Asia-Pacific in 2020 (over 4 crore (40 million) passengers per annum) by the Airports Council International. In 2023, the airport was awarded as the Cleanest Airport in the Asia-Pacific Region and also stood first again in the rankings for 2022 Airport Service Quality (ASQ) Awards in the category of over 4 crore (40 million) passengers per annum, conducted by Airports Council International.

== Future expansion ==
The newer domestic arrivals and departures terminals 1C and 1D, respectively, have been connected and expanded into a singular domestic terminal which are now known as simply, Terminal 1, capable of handling up to 40 million annual passengers.

Terminals 4, 5, and 6 will be built at a later stages which will be triggered by growth in passenger traffic. Once completed, all international flights will move to these three new terminals. Terminal 3 will then be solely used for handling domestic air traffic. A new cargo handling building is also planned. According to Delhi International Airport Limited (DIAL), these new terminals will increase the airport's annual passenger volume capacity to 10 crore (100 million).

In 2016, DIAL submitted a plan to the then aviation secretary, R.N. Choubey, outlining the expansion of the airport with the construction of a new fourth runway and Terminal 4 in a phased manner. The Master Plan of the airport, initially drafted in 2016, was later reviewed and updated by DIAL in consultation with the Airports Authority of India. According to the plan, the terminal construction should have started after the fourth runway was completed and Terminal 1 was expanded. However, the conversion and expansion of Terminal 2 into a fully-international terminal has been put on halt and deferred.

== Accidents and incidents ==
- 1970: The pilot of a Royal Nepal Airlines Fokker F27-200 (9N-AAR) lost control due to severe thunderstorms and downdrafts, crashing just short of the runway. The plane was landing after a flight from Kathmandu, Nepal. Of the five crew and 18 passengers, one crew member was killed.
- 1972: Japan Air Lines Flight 471 crashed outside of Palam Airport, killing 82 of 87 occupants; ten of eleven crew members and 72 of 76 passengers died, and three people on the ground.
- 1973: Indian Airlines Flight 440 crashed while on approach to Palam Airport, killing 48 of the 65 passengers and crew on board.
- 1990: An Air India Boeing 747 flying on the London-Delhi-Mumbai route and carrying 215 people (195 passengers and 20 crew) touched down at Indira Gandhi International Airport after a flight from London Heathrow Airport. On application of reverse thrust, a failure of the no. 1 engine pylon to wing attachment caused this engine to tilt nose down. Hot exhaust gases caused a fire on the left-wing. There were no casualties but the aircraft was damaged beyond repair and written off.
- 1993: An Uzbekistan Airlines Tupolev Tu-154 that had been leased by Indian Airlines due to an ongoing pilot strike flipped over and caught fire while landing in bad weather. There were no fatalities, but the aircraft was destroyed by a post-crash fire.
- 1994: A Sahara Airlines Boeing 737-2R4C (registered VT-SIA) crashed while performing a training flight killing all four people on board and one person on the ground. Wreckage struck an Aeroflot Ilyushin-86 (registered RA-86119) parked nearby, killing four people inside.
- 1995: Indian Airlines Flight 492 (IC 492), a Boeing 737-2A8 (Registered VT-ECS), was damaged beyond repair when the aircraft overshot the runway at Delhi Airport due to pilot error, on its scheduled flight from Jaipur to Delhi.
- On 12 November 1996, the airport was involved in the Charkhi Dadri mid-air collision when a Saudia Boeing 747-100B, climbing out after take-off, collided with an incoming Kazakhstan Airlines Ilyushin Il-76 chartered by a fashion company, causing the deaths of all 349 people on board the two planes.
- On 24 December 1999, Indian Airlines Flight 814 bound for Delhi was hijacked by Pakistan-based Islamic terrorist outfit Jaish-e-Mohammed. The plane was taken to Pakistan, Afghanistan and the UAE. After the turn of the millennium, the plane was allowed to go back to Delhi. One passenger was killed.
- On 28 June 2024, a portion of the roof of Terminal 1 collapsed on parked vehicles amid heavy rains in the early morning. One person was killed and eight were injured.

== See also ==
- Transport in India
- List of airports in India
- List of busiest airports in India
- Aviation in India
