= Birla Institute of Technology, Patna =

Educational institution in Bihar, India

Birla Institute of Technology, Mesra - Patna Campus
- BIT Mesra Patna
- Other name: BIT Mesra-Patna Campus
- Motto: सा विद्या या विमुक्तये
- Motto in English: Learning is that which Liberates
- Type: Government Funded Technical Institute (GFTI)
- Established: 2006; 20 years ago
- Affiliations: BIT Mesra
- Chancellor: C. K. Birla
- Vice-Chancellor: Dr. Indranil Manna
- Director: Dr. Dheeresh Kumar Mallick
- Location: Patna, Bihar, 800014, India; 25°35′44″N 85°5′11″E
- Campus: Urban
- Website: Official Website

Birla Institute of Technology, Mesra - Patna Campus, also called BIT Patna, is an educational institute offering undergraduate and postgraduate courses located in Patna, Bihar, India. It is an off campus of Birla Institute of Technology, Mesra, Ranchi.

== History ==
Birla Institute of Technology, Patna Campus was established in 2006, on the initiative of Govt. of Bihar. The institute came into existence by Public-Private Partnership (PPP) mode under flagship management of BIT Mesra. The Chief Minister of Bihar Nitish Kumar, laid the foundation stone of the institute in December 2005. The institute started academic programme from the session 2006–07.

== Campus ==
The campus of the Institute at Patna is located between the Bihar Veterinary College and the Jai Prakash Narayan Airport, the campus is fully residential and comprises academic space, staff quarters, transit hostel, dispensary, playground, gymnasium, student activity centre, dancing room, yoga hall and an auditorium. Besides the college also has a local police station for security reasons.

The campus is entirely residential with accommodation facilities provided for all students in hostels on the campus. The college offers free transport bus facility to its students. The campus has three boys' hostel and one girls' hostel. It also has an ATM facility. The college is also equipped with a central library with an online e-library system for greater benefits of the students.

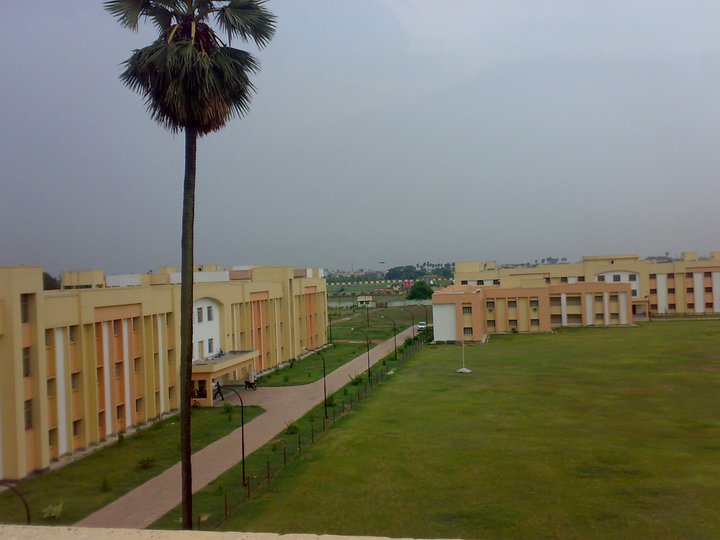
Aerial view of hostels and guest house inside BIT-P

=== Rules & regulations ===
- There are three boys hostel and one girls hostel. All the hostels have their own mess facility, reading room and common room. Overall the hostel facility is quite decent.
- There is enough space for all sorts of games. The college premises comprises up of 2 well maintained basketball courts and 1 lawn tennis court. Gym facility is also available.
- All the faculty members are highly experienced and provide quality content. Staff members are very supportive.
- Apart from all these Dispensary (24*7) is available, canteen, stationery shop is also available.

There is a future plan for further advanced development of the college campus.

== Academics ==
=== Academic programmes ===
The following Undergraduate courses are conducted at BIT Patna:-

- Bachelor of Technology (B.Tech.) in Civil Engineering.
- Bachelor of Technology (B.Tech.) in Computer Science Engineering.
- Bachelor of Technology (B.Tech.) in Electrical & Electronics Engineering.
- Bachelor of Technology (B.Tech.) in Electronics & Communication Engineering.
- Bachelor of Technology (B.Tech.) in Artificial Intelligence and Machine Learning (AI/ML).
- Bachelor of Technology (B.Tech.) in Mechanical Engineering
- Integrated Master of Science (I.Msc.) in Mathematics and Computing (MnC)

- Bachelor of Computer Application (B.C.A).
- Bachelor of Business Economics (B.B.E).
- Bachelor of Business Administration (B.B.A).

The following Postgraduate courses are conducted at BIT Patna:-

- Master of Technology (MTech) in Computer Science & Engineering.
- Master of Technology (M.E.) in Electronics & Communication Engineering.

The following Post Doctorate (PhD) courses are conducted in BIT Patna:-

- Civil Engineering.
- Computer Science Engineering.
- Electronics & Communication Engineering.
- Electrical & Electronics Engineering.
- Production Engineering.
- Management.
- Applied Physics.
- Applied Chemistry.
- Applied Mathematics.

=== Admissions ===
Student admissions to Engineering & Architecture courses are done strictly through JEE(Main). A good rank in JEE(Main) is generally required for admission to the preferred branches at this college. The Counselling process is conducted by its parent institution, BIT Mesra.

== Student life ==
=== Technika ===
Technika is the annual technical festival of BIT-P. Viola is an annual rock-show organized during Technika, where national and international rock bands like Strings and Underground Authority had performed. The college also organizes annual athletic-meet & sports fest named "Prakrida" along with inter-branch sport tournaments.

=== Achievements ===
Students from the college have gone to NASA, and have won Microsoft Imagine Cup in previous years. The institute promotes coding culture among the students and people have represented the college in ACM ICPC like events. Filmmaking is the most appreciated hobby of the students. In September 2017, Department of IT, Government of Bihar conducted a 24-hour National Level Hackathon in the BIT Patna campus.
