= Purnia Airport =

Domestic airport in Purnea, Bihar, India

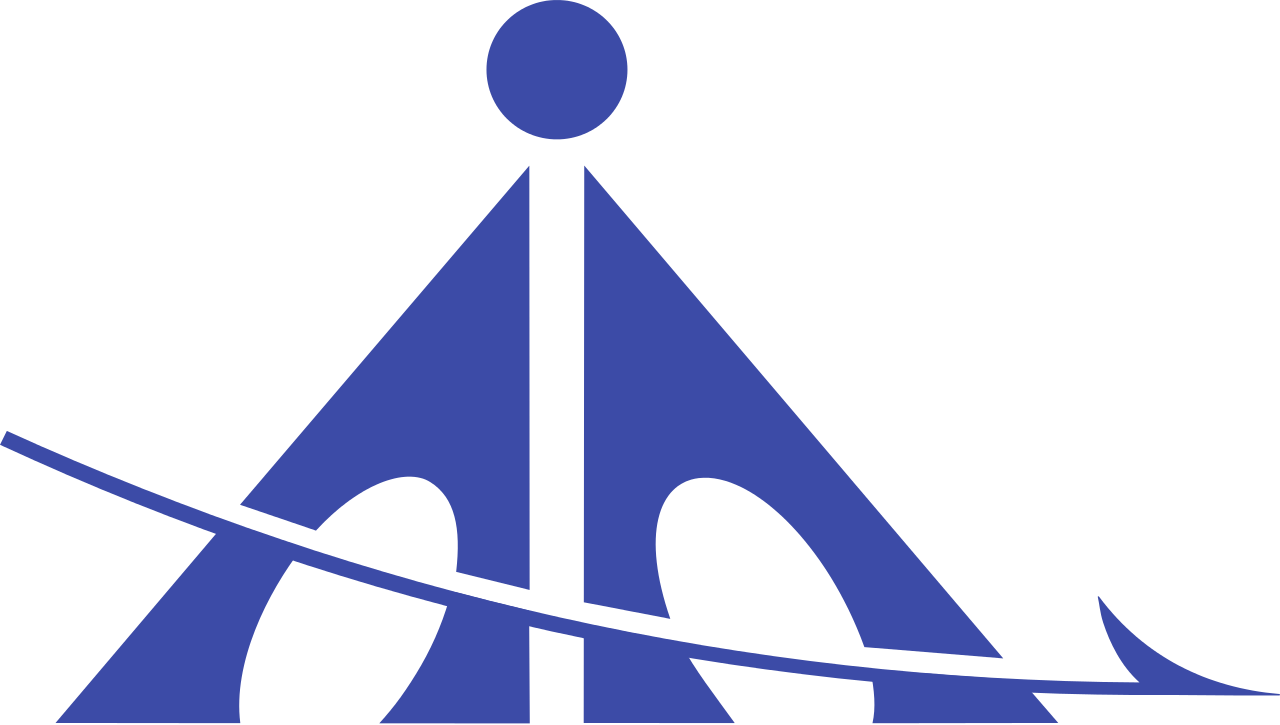
Purnea Airport

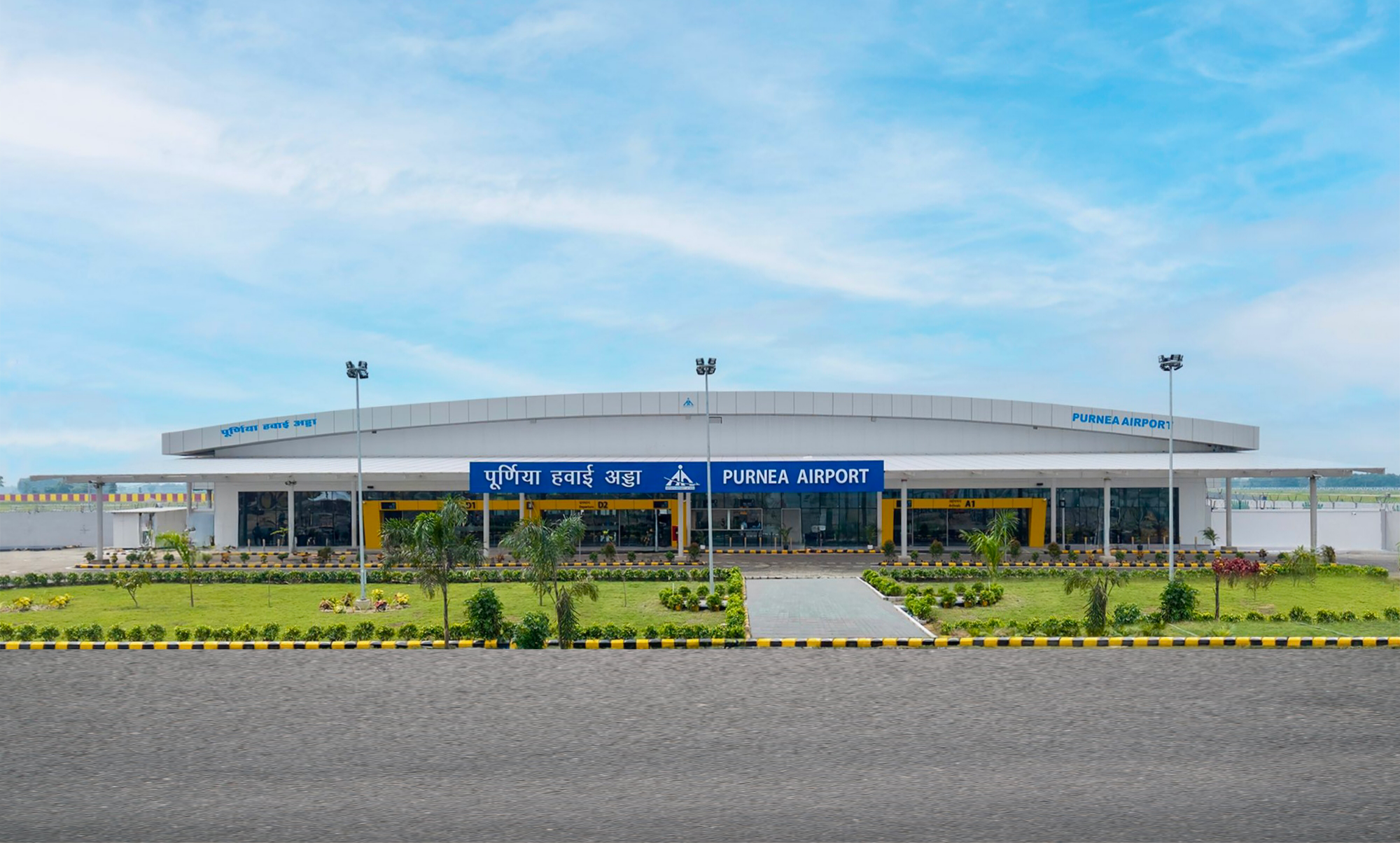
- IATA: PXN; ICAO: VEPU

Summary
- Airport type: Military/Public
- Owner: Indian Air Force
- Operator: Airports Authority of India
- Serves: Purnia, Katihar
- Location: Goasi (Chunapur), Purnia, Bihar, India
- Opened: 15 September 2025; 13 months ago
- Elevation AMSL: 39 m (128 ft)
- Coordinates: 25°45′35″N 087°24′36″E

Map
- Location of airport PXN/VEPU (India)

Runways
Direction	Length		Surface
Direction	ft	m	Surface
09/27	11,000	3,352	Concrete

Statistics (April 2025 – March 2026)
- Passengers: 1,62,316 (▲ -%)
- Aircraft movements: 1,652 (▲ -%)
- Cargo tonnage: 0 ( 0%)
- Source: AAI

Purnea Airport (IATA: PXN, ICAO: VEPU) is a domestic airport and an Indian Air Force station serving Purnia and Seemanchal subregion in Bihar, India. It is located on the western outskirts of Purnia, in Goasi (Chunapur) and is operated by the Airports Authority of India.

== History ==
The airfield was built in 1963, after the 1962 Sino-Indian War, as a launching base for the Siliguri Corridor by the Indian Air Force to support military logistics and to support operations in the areas of Northeast India. It was originally known as Chunapur Air force Station. The base was maintained by the '5 Care & Maintenance Unit' (C&MU) of the IAF till 1974. In the Indo-Pakistani war of 1971, the airfield was used as a secondary diversion airfield. The '14 Forward Base Support Unit' (FBSU) was formed on 1 Jan 1981. During the 1980s, the airbase saw active flying by Folland Gnat / HAL Ajeet aircraft. Hawker Hunter and MiG-21FL Type-77 aircraft. Night-time operations began in 1987. Some MiG-27s based at Kalaikunda Air Force Station were temporarily operated from this Base from 2003 to 2005. It has remained under the control of the Indian Air Force for decades with passenger operations scheduled to start in September, 2025. Balurghat Airways and Jam Airways used to operate Purnia-Kolkata flights during 1956-58 and 1976–78, respectively. They, however, withdrew their services for want of adequate infrastructure.

== Civil enclave ==
Initial talks about converting a small area of the airport into a civil enclave began in the early 2000s. This was done considering the need for better air connectivity in the Kosi-Seemanchal subregion of Bihar. Commercial flight operations were launched in 2012 for a brief period, but were short lived due to inadequate infrastructure and low demand. In June 2022 Government of Bihar completed the acquisition of around 52.5 acres of land right next to the existing Air Force base to start construction on the civil terminal. A VIP lounge, cargo facilities and other supporting infrastructure is also planned to be built. Purnia airport was selected as part of Government of India's UDAN regional connectivity scheme to boost air access in underserved regions of North Bihar. In early 2025, the Airport Authority of India approved a contract to construct an interim passenger terminal. The contract was worth ₹33.99 crore (US$3.5 million) with construction to complete within three to four months. Small protests have occurred over alleged compensation delays in land acquisition, however local officials stated payments were processed send to respective land owners. The terminal and airport was expected to be operational by the end of 2025, and scheduled flights beginning afterwards. This airport was opened for the public on 15 September By PM Narendra Modi. Initial routes were proposed to connect Purnia to Patna, Delhi, Mumbai and Kolkata enhancing air connectivity for residents in North Bihar and nearby areas of West Bengal and Nepal.

IndiGo and Star Air have started direct flights from Purnia to Kolkata and Ahmedabad from September 15. IndiGo additionally commenced direct flight services to Delhi starting October 26.

With steadily increasing passenger traffic and growing demand for better air connectivity, there is a pressing need to develop a permanent terminal building at Purnea Airport. The current temporary facility is inadequate to support expanding operations and the rising expectations of travelers. Additionally, passengers have expressed strong demand for more airlines such as Air India, Akasa Air, Air India Express and new routes, particularly to major hubs such as Mumbai, Bengaluru, Patna and Delhi. Establishing a permanent terminal and expanding route networks will significantly enhance travel accessibility, support regional economic growth, and ensure that Purnea Airport can operate efficiently and sustainably in the long term.

== Airlines and destinations ==
=== Passenger ===
Airlines	Destinations
IndiGo	Delhi, Hyderabad, Kolkata
Star Air	Ahmedabad, Kolkata

== See also ==
- List of airports in India
- List of busiest airports in India
- List of airports in Bihar
- Darbhanga Airport
- Gaya Airport
- Jay Prakash Narayan Airport
