= Jay Prakash Narayan Airport =

Airport serving Patna, Bihar, India

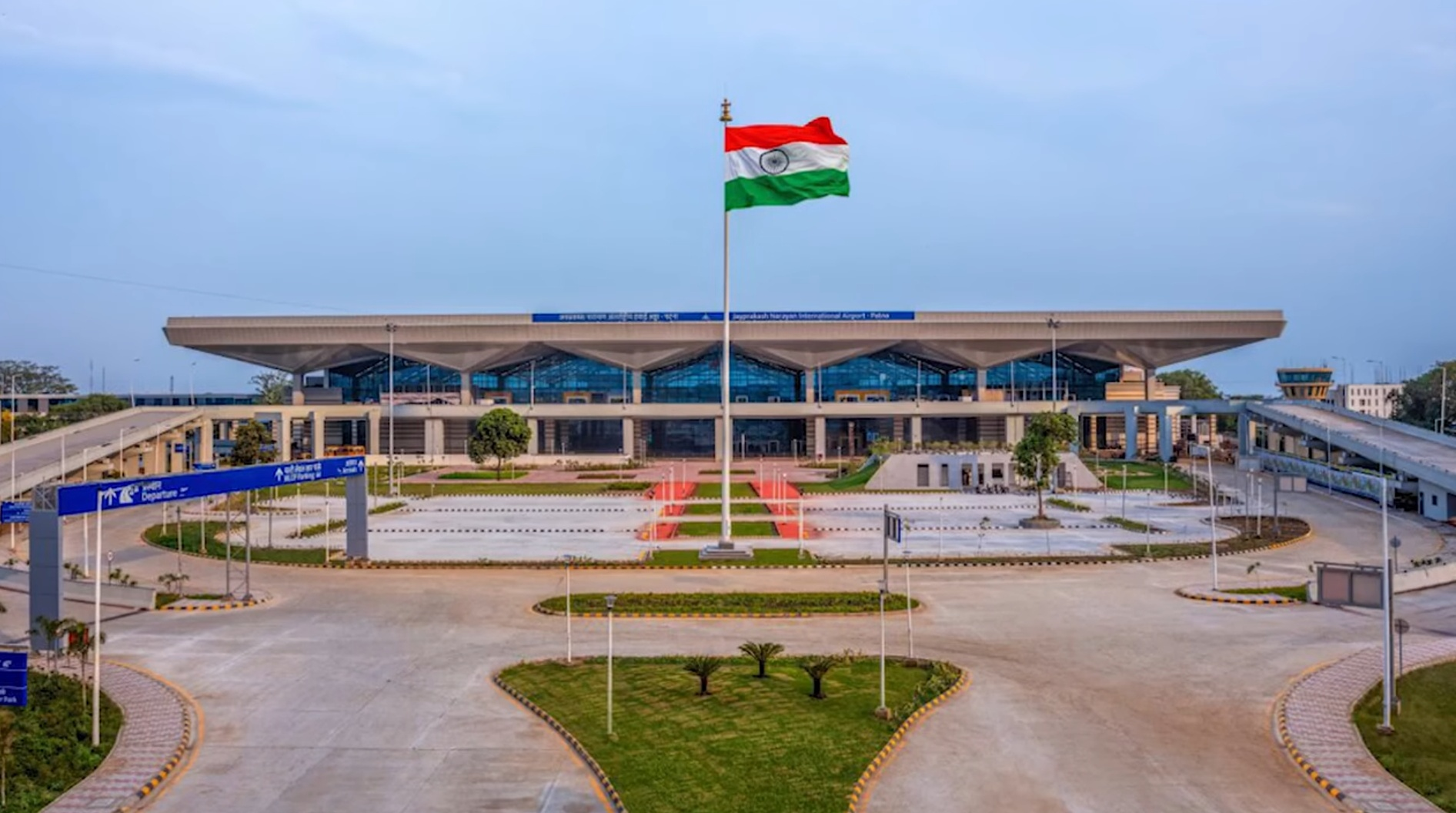
- IATA: PAT; ICAO: VEPT

Summary
- Airport type: Public
- Owner: Airports Authority of India
- Operator: Airports Authority of India
- Serves: Patna
- Location: Patna, Bihar, India
- Elevation AMSL: 52 m (171 ft)
- Coordinates: 25°35′29″N 085°05′21″E
- Website: Patna Airport

Map
- Location within Patna Location within Bihar Location within India

Runways
Direction	Length		Surface
Direction	m	ft	Surface
07/25	2,072	6,798	Asphalt

Statistics (April 2025 - March 2026)
- Passengers: 4,386,376 (▲14.8%)
- Aircraft movements: 31,075 (▲19.6%)
- Cargo tonnage: 11,298.3 (▲23.7%)
- Source: AAI

Jay Prakash Narayan Airport is a customs airport serving Patna, the capital of Bihar, India. Named after the independence activist and political leader Jayprakash Narayan, it is the 20th-busiest airport in India. To cater to burgeoning demand, the Airports Authority of India (AAI) initiated a project to expand and modernise the airport infrastructure, including the construction of a new two-level passenger terminal, which was inaugurated on 29 May 2025.

== Overview ==
The terminal building at the airport is spread across an area of 65,150 square metres and can handle around 1 crore (10 million) passengers annually.

The airport currently has a solitary runway with an asphalt surface measuring 2,072 by 45 metres (6,798 ft × 148 ft), making it untenable for the operation of larger aircraft. Straddling the airport to the southwest is the arterial line of the Indian Railways, rendering moot the possibility to extend the runway. Efforts to reconcile this in the past have failed.

The airport's international air service to Nepal has been closed since the Indian Airlines Flight 814 was hijacked and taken to Kandahar on 24 December 1999. Since then, the airport does not handle any international operations. The airport is enabled with Digi Yatra since July 2024, a provision that facilitates entry to the airport terminal through biometric recognition.

== Facilities ==
=== Terminal ===
Patna Airport consists of one passenger terminal. The new terminal was inaugurated on 29 May 2025. It was built by NCC Limited and became operational on 3 June 2025. The two-storey terminal, with arrivals on the ground floor and departures on the first, has been constructed to accommodate 3,000 passengers at peak hours—1,500 on each floor. Spread across 65,150 square metres, the facility boasts five aerobridges and 13 boarding gates. The terminal houses 64 check-in counters, nine automatic tray retrieval systems (ATRS), Digi Yatri gates for contactless travel, security checks on the first floor and four conveyor belts in the arrivals hall. The annual passenger handling capacity of the new terminal is 1 crore (10 million). The terminal's design takes cues from Bihar's cultural heritage with traditional artwork, murals, and carvings gracing its interiors. Inspired by the ruins of Nalanda, the building includes an insulated roofing system, LED lighting, and heat-minimising glazing for energy efficiency, targeting a 4-star GRIHA eco-rating. The multilevel car park (MLCP) on the city side has been operational since 3 June 2025, offering parking space for 1,100 vehicles.

=== Cargo terminal ===
Patna Airport has a new domestic air cargo terminal, inaugurated on 25 February 2025. This terminal is significantly larger than the previous one, increasing the annual cargo handling capacity from 7,500 metric tonnes to 22,000 metric tonnes. The new terminal is also equipped with a cold storage facility, which is crucial for transporting perishable goods like mangoes and litchis.

== Future expansion ==
Owing to the airport being sandwiched between the Sanjay Gandhi Jaivik Udyan and Phulwari Sharif railway station, the runway of the airport is too short to accommodate larger aircraft. Thanks to this constriction coupled against the backdrop of burgeoning demand and passenger traffic, the construction of a new terminal went underway in October 2018, at a cost of ₹1,217 crore (US$152 million). The new terminal spans 65,155 square meters, up from the originally proposed 57,000 square meters, and marks a substantial increase over the 7,200 square meters area of the now-demolished old terminal. It features five aerobridges, and with resurfacing work currently underway at the former terminal site, the apron will eventually accommodate 14 aircraft, including 11 Code C and 3 ATR 72-type, compared to the current capacity of just six. The former air traffic control (ATC) tower was demolished following the completion and commissioning of the new 25-meter tall tower, located adjacent to the Birla Institute of Technology, Patna, which became operational in December 2023.

The interior design of the terminal has been inspired by Madhubani art, a renowned traditional art form of Bihar, and the ruins of the Nalanda University. The design was created by the Singapore-based firm, Meinhardt and was executed by the Hyderabad-based firm, Nagarjuna Construction Company Limited (NCC). The terminal is capable of serving more than 80 lakh (8 million) passengers per year (previously proposed as 45 lakh, or 4.5 million), in contrast to only around 30 lakh (3 million) passengers per year at present. Around 13.1 acres of land near the airport has been used for its construction, and in lieu of 11.35 acres of land in Anisabad, the Airports Authority of India (AAI) will transfer the airport to the Government of Bihar once the expansion works are completed.

The land parcel atop which the new terminal stands previously featured several buildings, which included the Airport Colony and the IAS Bhavan: they were demolished, and utility buildings like the Meteorological Centre and Bihar Flying Club were relocated. The new terminal was expected be completed by 2021, but due to delays stemming from the COVID-19 pandemic, including labour shortages and supply disruptions, it only became operational on 3 June 2025. The new terminal building was inaugurated on 29 May 2025. All domestic flight operations were shifted to the new terminal on 3 June 2025, whereupon the old terminal building, which had been in service for over two decades, was decommissioned. Following the transition of operations to the new terminal on 3 June 2025, the old terminal, which had remained unused for three months, was demolished by September to make way for the expansion of the apron, including the construction of new aircraft parking bays.

The AAI has planned to develop a civil enclave at the Bihta Air Force Station, 20 km (12 mi) away from Patna, to cater larger aircraft. In October 2016, the Cabinet of Bihar approved the Patna Master Plan, which envisages development of a new passenger terminal at Bihta. The Government of Bihar is acquiring 126 acres of land for construction of the terminal.

== Airlines and destinations ==
Airlines	Destinations
Air India	Delhi, Mumbai
Air India Express	Bengaluru, Chennai, Delhi, Ghaziabad, Goa–Mopa, Hyderabad,
Alliance Air	Bhopal, Kolkata
IndiGo	Ahmedabad, Bengaluru, Bhubaneswar, Chandigarh, Chennai, Delhi, Hyderabad, Kolkata, Lucknow, Mumbai, Navi Mumbai, Pune, Ranchi
SpiceJet	Ahmedabad, Bengaluru, Delhi, Hyderabad, Mumbai

== Statistics ==
As of 2019-2020 data, Patna airport handled more than 40 lakh (4 million) passengers which was the highest ever recorded at the airport before the COVID-19 pandemic. Aircraft movements are currently at 25,501, which has also increased by 18.2% since the previous years. Between 2021-22, Patna Airport also handled 12,409 metric tonnes of cargo, which underwent an increase of 4.6% from the previous years. Patna Airport is currently the 14th busiest airport in India in terms of passengers catered by the airport.

Passenger, aircraft movements, and cargo at Patna Airport (2011–2024)
Year	Passengers	Change	Aircraft movements	Change	Cargo (MT)	Change	Ref
2025–26	4,386,376	▲14.8%	31,075	▲19.6%	11,298.3	▲23.7%	
2024–25	3,819,477	▲11%	25,992	▲9.5%	9,135	▼0.3%	
2023–24	3,440,450	▼8.2%	23,740	▼15%	9,165	▼20.8%	
2022–23	3,748,635	▲26.3%	27,931	▲9.5%	11,571	▼6.8%	
2021–22	2,967,681	▲9.5%	25,501	▲18.2%	12,409	▲4.6%	
2020–21	2,710,000	▼40.1%	21,572	▼30.3%	11,859	▼3.2%	
2019–20	4,525,765	▲11.4%	30,959	▲10.2%	12,249	▲7.1%	
2018–19	4,061,900	▲30.6%	28,087	▲28.2%	11,435	▲66.2%	
2017–18	3,111,273	▲47.3%	21,916	▲41.3%	6,879	▲4.4%	
2016–17	2,112,150	▲33.3%	15,508	▲11.2%	6,591	▲49.3%	
2015–16	1,584,013	▲32.4%	13,947	▲26.1%	4,414	▼15.1%	
2014–15	1,196,540	▲14.5%	11,060	▲11.5%	5,198	▲7.2%	
2013–14	1,044,127	▲4.1%	9,902	▼0.7%	4,849	▲115.4%	
2012–13	1,003,169	▼1.8%	9,972	▼3.8%	2,251	▼34.3%	
2011–12	1,021,544	▲21.8%	10,369	▲8.6%	3,425	▲4.5%	

== Accidents and incidents ==
- On 17 July 2000, Alliance Air Flight 7412 crashed near the airport, killing 60 people.
- On 19 June 2022, SpiceJet flight SG723, a Boeing 737 carrying 185 passengers, made an emergency landing at Patna Airport after one of its engines caught fire, reportedly due to a bird strike.

== See also ==
- List of airports in India
- List of busiest airports in India
- List of airports in Bihar
- Darbhanga Airport
- Gaya Airport
- Purnia Airport
