= Gaya Airport =

International airport in Gaya, Bihar, India

Gaya International Airport
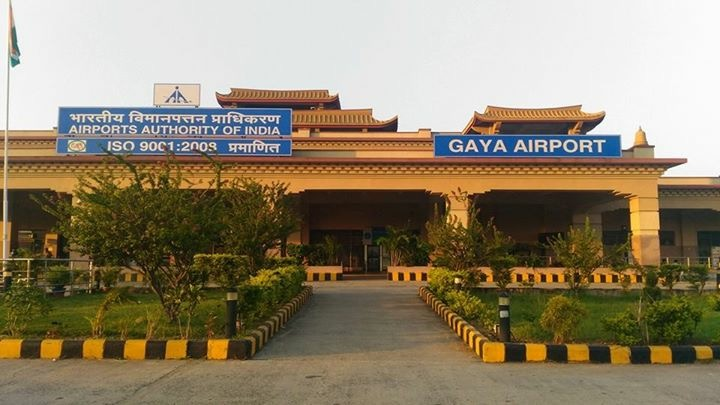
- IATA: GAY; ICAO: VEGY

Summary
- Airport type: Public
- Operator: Airports Authority of India
- Serves: Gaya
- Location: Gaya, Bihar, India
- Opened: 2002; 24 years ago
- Elevation AMSL: 116 m (381 ft)
- Coordinates: 24°44′40″N 084°57′04″E
- Website: Gaya Airport

Map
- Location within Bihar Location within India

Runways
Direction	Length		Surface
Direction	m	ft	Surface
10/28	2,286	7,500	Asphalt

Statistics (April 2025 - March 2026)
- Passengers: 3,57,462 (▲8.6%)
- Aircraft movements: 2,998 (▲18.1%)
- Cargo tonnage: 0 ( 0%)
- Source: AAI

Gaya International Airport (IATA: GAY, ICAO: VEGY) is an international airport serving Gaya, Bihar, India. It is located 12 kilometres (7 1/2 miles) southwest of Gaya and five kilometres (three miles) from Bodh Gaya, where Gautama Buddha attained enlightenment.

== Overview ==
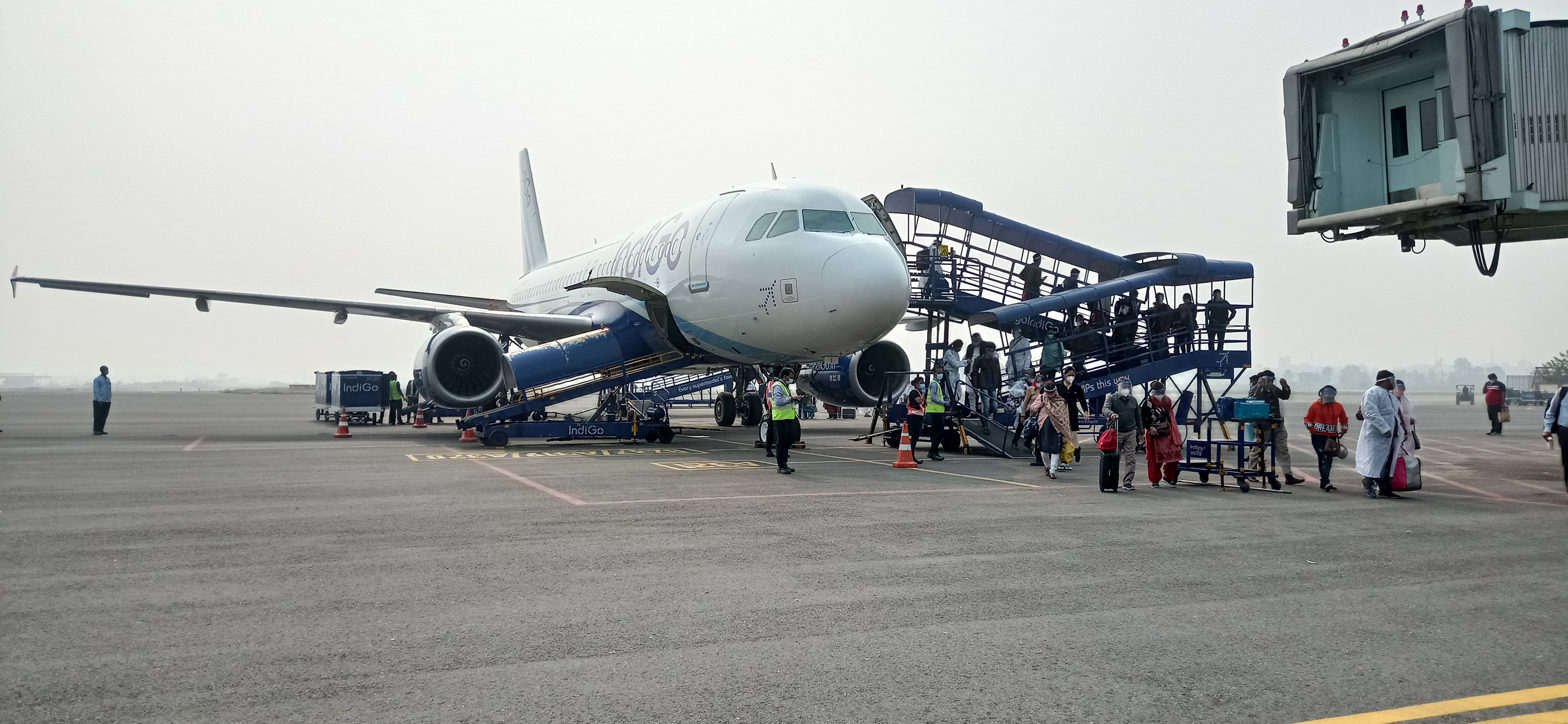
Apron area of the airport

The airport is spread over an area of 386 hectares (954 acres). The airport terminal building, spread over 7,500 square meters can handle 250 departure and 250 arrival passengers, two aerobridges and an apron capable for handling five Airbus A320 type aircraft. It is mainly seasonal and primarily caters to Buddhist tourists coming from South-East Asian countries from Thailand, Bhutan and Myanmar at present.

A January 2021 report by the Parliament of India described the IATA code as "inappropriate, unsuitable, offensive and embarrassing" for Gaya due to the city's religious significance. In its report, the Committee on Public Undertakings recommended changing the airport code from "GAY" to "YAG", asking the government to "make all efforts" to change the code. As of February 2022, IATA has rejected a code change, stating that airport codes are permanent unless a strong justification relating to air safety is given. LGBT groups in India have criticized the parliamentary committee's request as reflective of homophobia.

Gaya Airport also serves as the only place of Bihar from where Hajj pilgrims take direct flight to Jeddah and Madina in Saudi Arabia.

== Expansion ==
An additional 40 hectares (100 acres) of land is under process for acquiring, while another 40 hectares (100 acres) of land from four villages is to be acquired for runway expansion. The Airports Authority of India (AAI) plans to develop the airport as a standby to Kolkata Airport. The then Minister of State for Civil Aviation, K.C. Venugopal, informed the Rajya Sabha on 2018 that AAI has requested the Government of Bihar for a further acquisition of around 80 hectares (200 acres) to allow the airport to be expanded. The airport is to be expanded and upgraded with the construction of a new passenger terminal building which would replace the current terminal structure. Other expansion works include expanding runaway 10/28, and installation of CAT-I ILS approach system. In the future, a cargo terminal has also been planned to be built.

== Airlines and destinations ==
=== Passenger ===
Airlines	Destinations
Air India	Delhi
Bhutan Airlines	Seasonal: Bangkok–Suvarnabhumi, Paro
Drukair	Seasonal: Paro
IndiGo	Bangkok–Suvarnabhumi, Delhi, Kolkata
Myanmar Airways International	Seasonal: Yangon
Sky Angkor Airlines	Seasonal: Phnom Penh
Thai AirAsia	Bangkok–Don Mueang
Thai Airways International	Bangkok–Suvarnabhumi

== Statistics ==
Passenger and aircraft movements at Gaya Airport (2011-2022)
Year	Passengers	Change	Aircraft movements	Change	Ref
2021–22	47,311	▼32.1%	625	▼20.7%	
2020–21	69,655	▼70.7%	788	▼78.1%	
2019–20	237,452	▲16.1%	3,606	▲96.1%	
2018–19	213,635	▲14.4%	2,649	▲8.6%	
2017–18	186,670	▲5.1%	2,439	▲11.2%	
2016–17	177,663	▲13.1%	2,193	▲4.8%	
2015–16	157,144	▲22.0%	2,093	▲28.0%	
2014–15	128,829	▲24.6%	1,635	▲13.8%	
2013–14	102,212	▼16.5%	1,437	▼5.6%	
2012–13	121,091	▲23.2%	1,524	▲23.9%	
2011–12	98,273	▲94.0%	1,230	▲108.5%	

== See also ==
- List of airports in India
- List of busiest airports in India
- List of airports in Bihar
- Darbhanga Airport
- Jay Prakash Narayan Airport
- Purnia Airport
