= Raxaul Airport =

Airport in Raxaul, Bihar, India

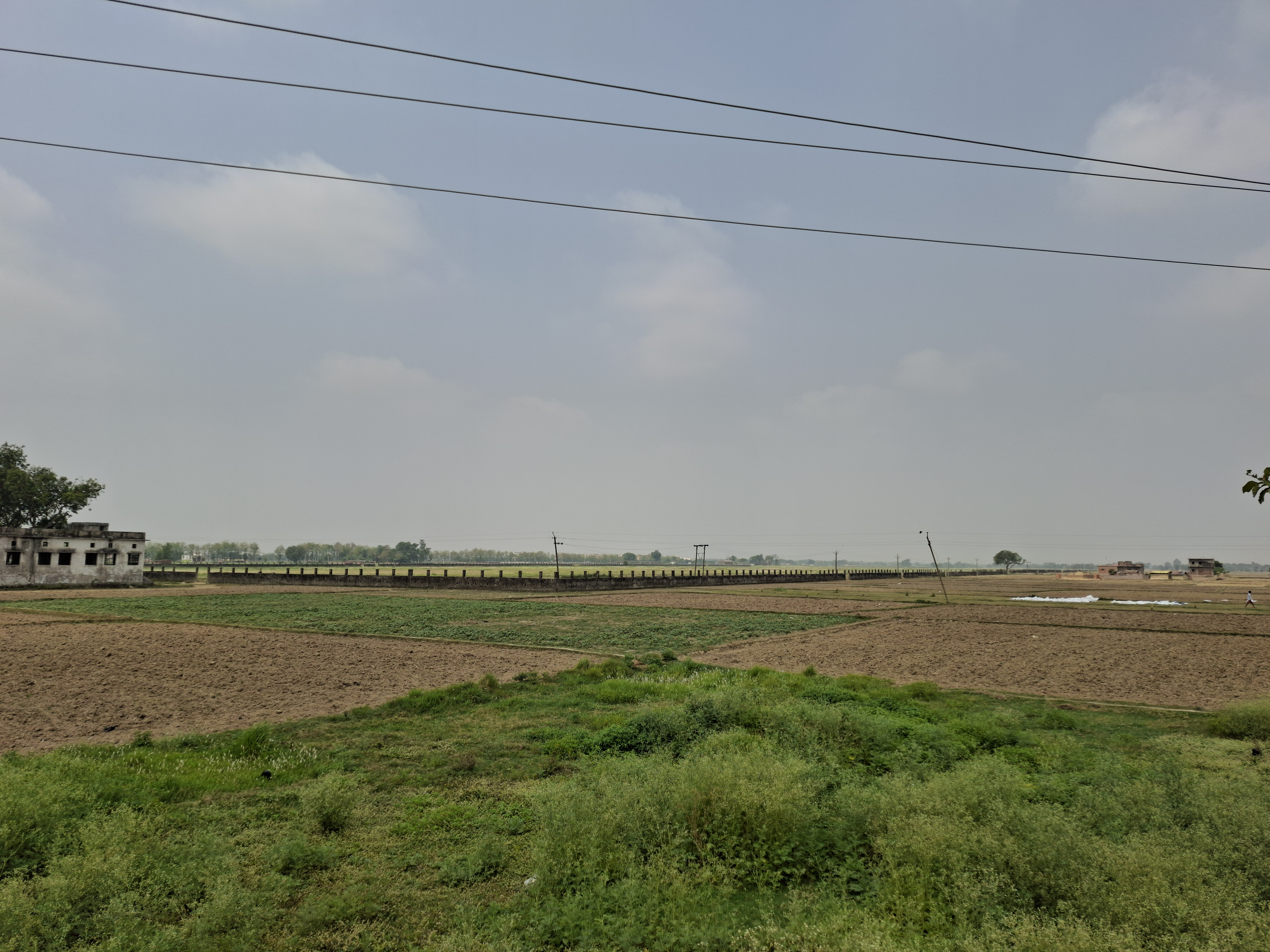
- IATA: none; ICAO: VERL

Summary
- Airport type: Public
- Operator: Airports Authority of India
- Location: Raxaul, Bihar, India
- Elevation AMSL: 20 ft (6.1 m)
- Coordinates: 26°59′47″N 084°49′14″E

Map
- Airport in India VERL (India)

Runways
Direction	Length		Surface
Direction	ft	m	Surface
10/28	3,600	1,097

Raxaul Airport (ICAO: VERL) is an airport located at Raxaul in the state of Bihar, India. It was established after the Sino-Indian War of 1962, when it served as an emergency landing ground for the Indian Army. The Airports Authority of India (AAI) that owns the airport has undertaken a pre-feasibility study at the airport to upgrade the airport to handle ATR-72 aircraft. A draft Master Plan highlighting a requirement of an additional 121 acres of land has been submitted to the State Government. There have been recent proposals to expand the airport. In January 2024 the State Government agreed to acquire 139 acres of land worth Rupees 207 crore for the expansion of Raxaul airport.

== History ==
Raxaul Airport was established in 1962 as an emergency landing ground for the Indian Army and the Indian Air Force in the aftermath of the Sino-Indian War.
