= Darbhanga Airport =

Domestic airport in Darbhanga, Bihar, India

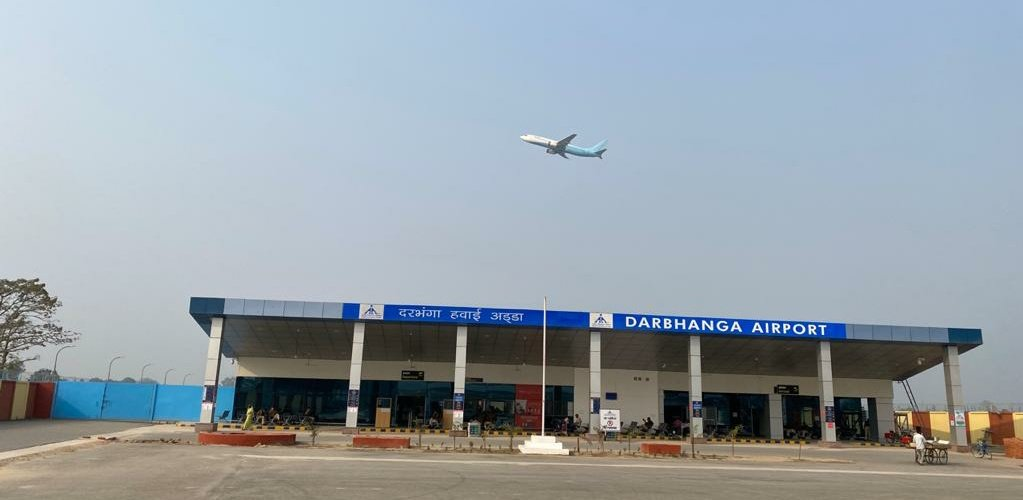
- IATA: DBR; ICAO: VEDH

Summary
- Airport type: Military/Public
- Owner: Indian Air Force
- Operator: Airports Authority of India
- Serves: Darbhanga
- Location: Darbhanga, Bihar, India
- Opened: 8 November 2020 (6 years ago)
- Elevation AMSL: 171 ft (52 m)
- Coordinates: 26°11′41″N 085°55′03″E

Map
- Location of airport DBR/VEDH (India)

Runways
Direction	Length		Surface
Direction	m	ft	Surface
10/28	2,743	9,000	Asphalt

Statistics (April 2025 - March 2026)
- Passengers: 774,524 (▲48%)
- Aircraft movements: 5,046 (▲37.5%)
- Cargo tonnage: 589.1 (▲41.7%)
- Source: AAI

Darbhanga Airport (IATA: DBR, ICAO: VEDH) is a domestic airport and an Indian Air Force Station, serving Darbhanga, Bihar, India. It is located just at the outskirts of the city near the NH-527B and NH-27 highways, which pass through Darbhanga. The airport is operated by the Airports Authority of India (AAI).

The airport serves as a major aviation gateway to North Bihar, particularly the Mithila region, with a potential catchment extending to neighbouring areas of Nepal. Its strategic location makes it important for regional air connectivity, facilitating access to major Indian cities for residents of North Bihar and potentially serving cross-border travellers from Nepal. In 2021–22, the airport ranked 44th busiest among Indian airports by passenger traffic and second in Bihar. In 2023–24, it ranked 50th busiest nationally and second in Bihar by cargo throughput, according to traffic statistics published by the Airports Authority of India.

== History ==
This airport was built by Maharaja Kameshwar Singh Bahadur of Darbhanga when he started his own private airline. It was funded by a private aviation company Darbhanga Aviation after Second World War. He purchased three former military Douglas DC3 aircraft. Darbhanga Aviation was started in 1950 and became defunct in 1962. During the 1962 Indo-China War, the airport was acquired by the Indian Air Force.

== Structure ==
Airport Authority of India built an Interim Terminal Building, a taxi track, and the apron area. The runway was strengthened to handle the Airbus A320 and Boeing 737 and a pre-fabricated building was erected to serve as a temporary terminal building. The government of India had sanctioned approximately ₹100 crores for these projects. On 16 February 2021 one Apron of 167 mt X 62mt was made operational. This Apron can accommodate Two B737-800/A320 at a time making the landing of planes smoother. Earlier due to the lack of parking space, airplanes had to wait in the sky. The terminal has six check-in counters, and a capacity to handle 200 peak hour passengers. A car parking facility has a capacity of 30 cars.

== UDAN Scheme and Commercial Success ==
In January 2018, SpiceJet was selected to operate flights from Darbhanga to Delhi, Bengaluru, and Mumbai under the Government's Regional Connectivity Scheme called UDAN.

Commercial flight operations officially commenced on 8 November 2020. Following its launch, Darbhanga Airport emerged as one of the most successful and top-performing regional airports in India under the UDAN initiative. By mid-2023, the airport had handled over 1.38 million passengers and operated more than 9,400 flights, leading the Ministry of Civil Aviation to cite it as a benchmark success for regional connectivity.

== Airlines and destinations ==
Airlines	Destinations
Akasa Air	Bengaluru, Delhi, Mumbai, Navi Mumbai
IndiGo	Delhi, Hyderabad, Mumbai
SpiceJet	Delhi, Mumbai

== Statistics ==
Passenger, Aircraft Movement, and Cargo at Darbhanga Airport

Year(APR To MAR)	Passengers	Change	Aircraft Movement	Change	Cargo (MT)	Change	Ref
2021 - 22	6,19,948		4,350		96		
2022 - 23	6,14,114	−0.9%	4,170	−4%	271		
2023 - 24	5,26,066	−14.3%	3,335	−20%	418	+54%	
2024 - 25	5,23,173	−0.5%	3,669	+10%	416	−0.4%	
2025 - 26	7,74,524	+48%	5,046	+37.5%	589.1	+41.7%	

== Future ==
Mithila painting at Darbhanga Airport

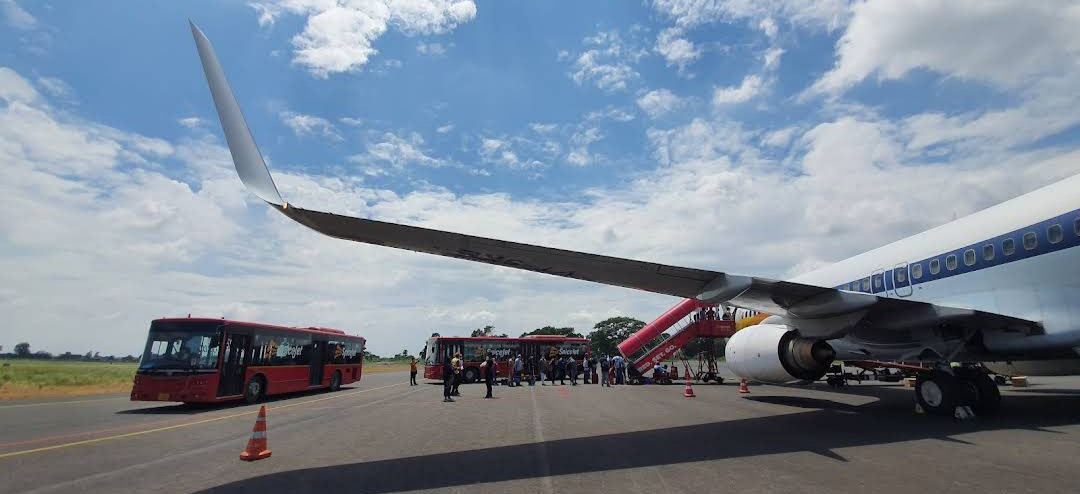
Apron area of the airport

The Government of Bihar has the acquired additional 78 acres (32 ha) of land and transferred it to the Airports Authority of India (AAI), which has started the DPR process for the further expansion of the passenger terminal building at the airport. The expansion plan is to develop a new passenger terminal, a new Air Traffic Control (ATC) tower, cargo facilities among other facilities close to NH-27 have been put forward by the AAI. Darbhanga MP, Gopal Jee Thakur, met Jayant Sinha and later Prime Minister Narendra Modi, and demanded to name the airport as Mahakavi Kokil Vidyapati Airport. This was also suggested by Jayant Sinha at the foundation stone laying ceremony for the construction of the current passenger terminal, by naming the airport after famous Maithili poet, Mahakavi Vidyapati.

In March 2023, the Government of Bihar acquired 24 acres (9.7 ha) of land for the runway expansion and another 54 acres (22 ha) for the construction of a new permanent terminal, while the remaining 24 acres (9.7 ha) for installation of Instrument Landing System (ILS) to facilitate night landing has been acquired, which was completed in mid-2023.

In November 2023, the tenders were floated for Phase 1 of the new terminal of the airport by the AAI. The estimated cost was around ₹632 crore (US$68 million). Then, bidding was opened and six firms bidded to build the terminal in February 2024, in which New Delhi-based Ahluwalia Contracts Pvt. Ltd. won the bid in the same month. Therefore, work on the new terminal officially began after Prime Minister Narendra Modi laid the foundation stone on 20 October 2024. The cost of the terminal and adjoining developments has been revised to ₹912 crore (US$97 million), and the project has a deadline of completion by September 2026.

=== New terminal ===
The new terminal building will act as a supersede to the airport and Darbhanga and its adjoining regions. It will be situated at the northern end of the airport, and will cover an area of 51,800 m^{2} (558,000 sq ft), a significant increase from the current terminal's 1,400 m^{2} (15,000 sq ft). The terminal will be developed in two phase as a two-storey building, of which the first floor will feature the departures area and the ground floor with the arrivals area, equipped with a wide range of facilities and amenities. It will have 40 check-in counters, 14 self-check-in kiosks, 12 automatic tray retrieval systems, 30 door- frame metal detector machines, four conveyor belts in the arrivals area and five aerobridges. As part of the first phase of the terminal, it will have an apron to accommodate seven [Code C] aircraft. With these considerable developments, the airport will be able to handle more than 8,000 passengers per day from the present 1,500 and from 10 to over 50 aircraft operations every day.

The new terminal will be designed to showcase traditional Madhubani paintings and draw architectural inspiration from the 19th-century Darbhanga Fort. Local artists will create artworks and sculptures for the waiting areas and the interior design will feature natural and earthy colour palettes. It will be a green and sustainable building, with electricity powered by solar energy, rainwater harvesting and water recycling systems, use of natural light over artificial LED lights, and will be advanced with technology to benefit all passengers like lifts, escalators, free WiFi, washrooms, sufficient seating areas, facilities for physically challenged persons like wheelchairs, medical and emergency facilities, firefighting services, tourist facilitation services like tourist information desks and vehicle parking areas outside the terminal, which will include a multi-level parking building on either sides of the approach roads connecting the terminal, among others.

Apart from the new terminal, the airport's development will facilitated with the extension of the runway from 2,700 m (9,000 ft) to 3,700 m (12,000 ft), signalling a major upgrade to handle widebody aircraft like the Airbus A380. Otherwise, a cargo complex, a fire station, a new ATC building and an admin block will surround the upcoming terminal. Additional land will be reserved on either sides of the terminal for its second phase of development, thereby bringing the ultimate area of the terminal exceeding 100,000 m^{2} (1,100,000 sq ft), with an apron suitable for 10 widebody-type aircraft. Construction on the terminal's first phase began from October 2024, and will be completed by September 2026.

=== Proposed international upgrade ===
In January 2025, the Bihar Cabinet approved the acquisition of 89.75 acres (36.32 ha) of land at a cost of about ₹245 crore to facilitate the extension of the runway to 3,700 metres (12,000 ft), enabling the operation of wide-body aircraft such as Boeing 777s and Airbus A330s, as part of a state proposal to upgrade Darbhanga Airport to international status.

The Airports Authority of India (AAI) will prepare a Detailed Project Report (DPR) for the runway extension, a larger apron, cargo terminal, and other supporting facilities after the land transfer is completed. Rajya Sabha MP Sanjay Kumar Jha has met Union Civil Aviation Minister Kinjarapu Ram Mohan Naidu to advocate for international flight approvals and route allocations to carriers, highlighting the airport’s potential to serve over 20 districts of North Bihar and nearby regions of Nepal.

The state government has set August 2025 as the deadline for completing land acquisition, with construction on runway upgrades and related infrastructure to follow.

== See also ==
- List of airports in India
- List of busiest airports in India
- List of airports in Bihar
- Gaya Airport
- Purnia Airport
- Jay Prakash Narayan Airport
