= List of IndiGo destinations =

IndiGo operates over more than 2700 flights daily and serves 143 destinations, including 99 within India and 44 international destinations across Asia, Africa, and Europe.

== List ==
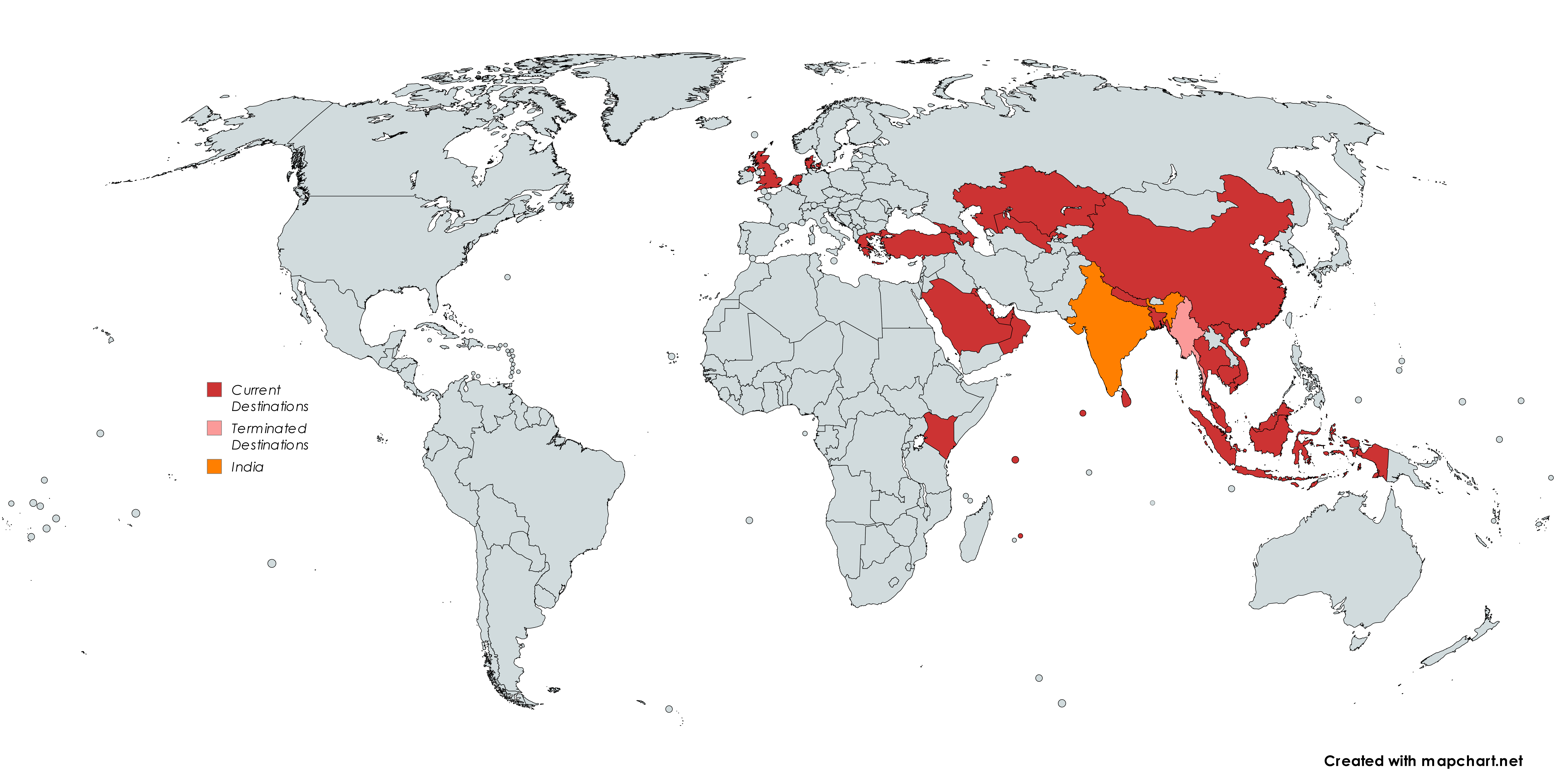
Indigo passenger destinations

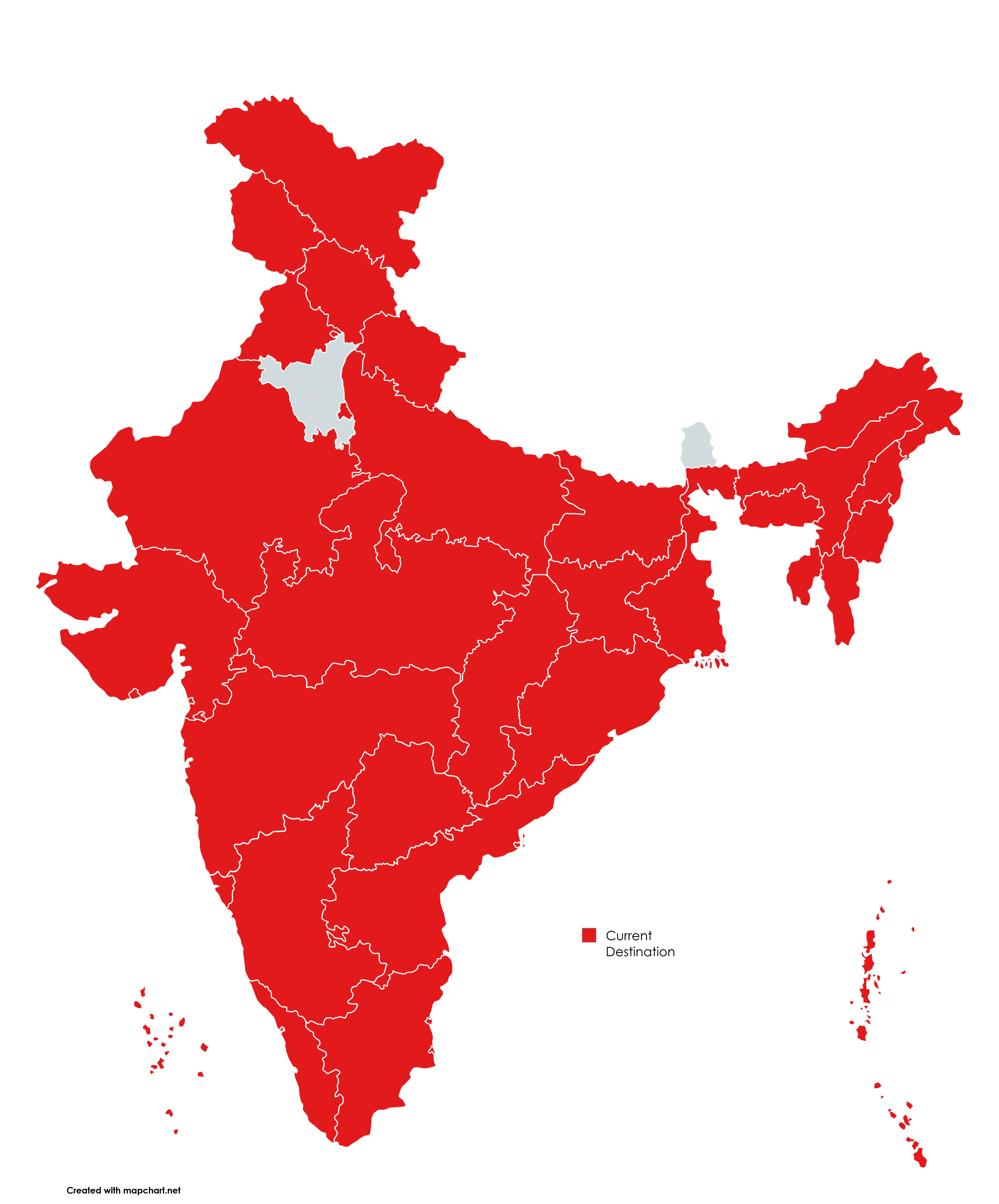
Indigo passenger destinations in India

Country (state)	City	Airport	Notes	Refs
Azerbaijan	Baku	Heydar Aliyev International Airport		
Bahrain	Bahrain	Bahrain International Airport		
Bangladesh	Dhaka	Hazrat Shahjalal International Airport		
Cambodia	Siem Reap	Siem Reap–Angkor International Airport		
China	Chengdu	Chengdu Shuangliu International Airport	Terminated	
China	Guangzhou	Guangzhou Baiyun International Airport		
China	Shanghai	Shanghai Pudong International Airport		
Denmark	Copenhagen	Copenhagen Airport	Terminated	
Georgia	Tbilisi	Shota Rustaveli Tbilisi International Airport		
Greece	Athens	Athens International Airport		
Hong Kong	Hong Kong	Hong Kong International Airport		
India (Andaman and Nicobar Islands)	Sri Vijaya Puram (Port Blair)	Veer Savarkar International Airport		
India (Andhra Pradesh)	Kadapa	Kadapa Airport		
India (Andhra Pradesh)	Kurnool	Kurnool Airport		
India (Andhra Pradesh)	Rajahmundry	Rajahmundry Airport		
India (Andhra Pradesh)	Tirupati	Tirupati Airport		
India (Andhra Pradesh)	Vijayawada	Vijayawada International Airport		
India (Andhra Pradesh)	Visakhapatnam	Alluri Sitarama Raju International Airport		
India (Arunachal Pradesh)	Itanagar	Itanagar Airport		
India (Assam)	Dibrugarh	Dibrugarh Airport		
India (Assam)	Guwahati	Lokpriya Gopinath Bordoloi International Airport		
India (Assam)	Jorhat	Jorhat Airport		
India (Assam)	Silchar	Silchar Airport		
India (Bihar)	Darbhanga	Darbhanga Airport		
India (Bihar)	Gaya	Gaya International Airport		
India (Bihar)	Patna	Jay Prakash Narayan Airport		
India (Bihar)	Purnea	Purnia Airport		
India (Chandigarh)	Chandigarh	Shaheed Bhagat Singh International Airport		
India (Chhattisgarh)	Jagdalpur	Jagdalpur Airport		
India (Chhattisgarh)	Raipur	Swami Vivekananda Airport		
India (Dadra and Nagar Haveli and Daman and Diu)	Diu	Diu Airport		
India (Delhi)	Delhi	Indira Gandhi International Airport	Hub	
India (Goa)	Mopa	Manohar International Airport		
India (Goa)	Panaji	Dabolim Airport		
India (Gujarat)	Ahmedabad	Sardar Vallabhbhai Patel International Airport		
India (Gujarat)	Bhavnagar	Bhavnagar Airport		
India (Gujarat)	Jamnagar	Jamnagar Airport		
India (Gujarat)	Rajkot	Rajkot Airport	Airport closed	
India (Gujarat)	Rajkot	Rajkot International Airport		
India (Gujarat)	Surat	Surat International Airport		
India (Gujarat)	Vadodara	Vadodara Airport		
India (Himachal Pradesh)	Dharamshala	Kangra Airport		
India (Jammu and Kashmir)	Jammu	Jammu Airport		
India (Jammu and Kashmir)	Srinagar	Srinagar Airport		
India (Jharkhand)	Deoghar	Deoghar Airport		
India (Jharkhand)	Ranchi	Birsa Munda Airport		
India (Karnataka)	Bengaluru	Kempegowda International Airport	Base	
India (Karnataka)	Belagavi	Belgaum Airport		
India (Karnataka)	Hubli	Hubli Airport		
India (Karnataka)	Mangaluru	Mangalore International Airport		
India (Karnataka)	Mysore	Mysore Airport		
India (Karnataka)	Shivamogga	Shivamogga Airport		
India (Kerala)	Kannur	Kannur International Airport		
India (Kerala)	Kochi	Cochin International Airport	Base	
India (Kerala)	Kozhikode	Calicut International Airport		
India (Kerala)	Thiruvananthapuram	Thiruvananthapuram International Airport		
India (Ladakh)	Leh	Kushok Bakula Rimpochee Airport		
India (Lakshadweep)	Agatti	Agatti Airport		
India (Madhya Pradesh)	Bhopal	Raja Bhoj Airport		
India (Madhya Pradesh)	Gwalior	Gwalior Airport		
India (Madhya Pradesh)	Indore	Devi Ahilya Bai Holkar Airport		
India (Madhya Pradesh)	Jabalpur	Jabalpur Airport		
India (Madhya Pradesh)	Khajuraho	Khajuraho Airport		
India (Madhya Pradesh)	Rewa	Rewa Airport		
India (Maharashtra)	Aurangabad	Aurangabad Airport		
India (Maharashtra)	Gondia	Gondia Airport		
India (Maharashtra)	Kolhapur	Kolhapur Airport		
India (Maharashtra)	Mumbai	Chhatrapati Shivaji Maharaj International Airport	Base	
India (Maharashtra)	Mumbai	Navi Mumbai International Airport		
India (Maharashtra)	Nagpur	Dr. Babasaheb Ambedkar International Airport		
India (Maharashtra)	Nashik	Nashik Airport		
India (Maharashtra)	Pune	Pune Airport		
India (Maharashtra)	Shirdi	Shirdi Airport		
India (Manipur)	Imphal	Imphal Airport		
India (Meghalaya)	Shillong	Shillong Airport		
India (Mizoram)	Aizawl	Lengpui Airport		
India (Nagaland)	Dimapur	Dimapur Airport		
India (Odisha)	Bhubaneswar	Biju Patnaik Airport		
India (Odisha)	Jharsuguda	Jharsuguda Airport		
India (Puducherry)	Pondicherry	Pondicherry Airport		
India (Punjab)	Amritsar	Sri Guru Ram Das Ji International Airport		
India (Punjab)	Jalandhar	Adampur Airport		
India (Rajasthan)	Ajmer	Kishangarh Airport		
India (Rajasthan)	Bikaner	Bikaner Airport		
India (Rajasthan)	Jaipur	Jaipur International Airport		
India (Rajasthan)	Jaisalmer	Jaisalmer Airport		
India (Rajasthan)	Jodhpur	Jodhpur Airport		
India (Rajasthan)	Udaipur	Maharana Pratap Airport		
India (Tamil Nadu)	Chennai	Chennai International Airport	Base	
India (Tamil Nadu)	Coimbatore	Coimbatore International Airport		
India (Tamil Nadu)	Madurai	Madurai International Airport		
India (Tamil Nadu)	Salem	Salem Airport		
India (Tamil Nadu)	Tiruchirappalli	Tiruchirappalli International Airport		
India (Tamil Nadu)	Thoothukudi	Thoothukudi Airport		
India (Telangana)	Hyderabad	Rajiv Gandhi International Airport	Base	
India (Tripura)	Agartala	Maharaja Bir Bikram Airport		
India (Uttarakhand)	Dehradun	Dehradun Airport		
India (Uttarakhand)	Pantnagar	Pantnagar Airport		
India (Uttar Pradesh)	Agra	Agra Airport		
India (Uttar Pradesh)	Ayodhya	Ayodhya International Airport		
India (Uttar Pradesh)	Bareilly	Bareilly Airport		
India (Uttar Pradesh)	Ghaziabad	Hindon Airport		
India (Uttar Pradesh)	Gorakhpur	Gorakhpur Airport		
India (Uttar Pradesh)	Kanpur	Kanpur Airport		
India (Uttar Pradesh)	Lucknow	Chaudhary Charan Singh International Airport		
India (Uttar Pradesh)	Noida	Noida International Airport		
India (Uttar Pradesh)	Prayagraj	Prayagraj Airport		
India (Uttar Pradesh)	Varanasi	Lal Bahadur Shastri Airport		
India (West Bengal)	Durgapur	Kazi Nazrul Islam Airport		
India (West Bengal)	Kolkata	Netaji Subhas Chandra Bose International Airport	Base	
India (West Bengal)	Siliguri	Bagdogra Airport		
Indonesia	Denpasar	Ngurah Rai International Airport		
Indonesia	Jakarta	Soekarno–Hatta International Airport		
Kazakhstan	Almaty	Almaty International Airport		
Kenya	Nairobi	Jomo Kenyatta International Airport		
Kuwait	Kuwait City	Kuwait International Airport		
Malaysia	Kuala Lumpur	Kuala Lumpur International Airport		
Malaysia	Langkawi	Langkawi International Airport		
Malaysia	Penang	Penang International Airport		
Maldives	Malé	Velana International Airport		
Mauritius	Plaine Magnien	Sir Seewoosagur Ramgoolam International Airport		
Myanmar	Yangon	Yangon International Airport	Terminated	
Nepal	Kathmandu	Tribhuvan International Airport		
Netherlands	Amsterdam	Amsterdam Airport Schiphol		
Oman	Muscat	Muscat International Airport		
Qatar	Doha	Hamad International Airport		
Réunion	Sainte-Marie	Roland Garros Airport	Ends 22 October 2026	
Saudi Arabia	Dammam	King Fahd International Airport		
Saudi Arabia	Jeddah	King Abdulaziz International Airport		
Saudi Arabia	Medina	Prince Mohammad bin Abdulaziz International Airport		
Saudi Arabia	Riyadh	King Khalid International Airport		
Seychelles	Mahé	Seychelles International Airport		
Singapore	Singapore	Changi Airport		
Sri Lanka	Colombo	Bandaranaike International Airport		
Sri Lanka	Jaffna	Jaffna International Airport		
Tanzania	Dar es Salaam	Julius Nyerere International Airport	Begins 1 November 2026	
Thailand	Bangkok	Suvarnabhumi Airport		
Thailand	Krabi	Krabi International Airport		
Thailand	Phuket	Phuket International Airport		
Turkey	Istanbul	Istanbul Airport		
United Arab Emirates	Abu Dhabi	Zayed International Airport		
United Arab Emirates	Dubai	Dubai International Airport		
United Arab Emirates	Fujairah	Fujairah International Airport		
United Arab Emirates	Ras Al Khaimah	Ras Al Khaimah International Airport		
United Arab Emirates	Sharjah	Sharjah International Airport		
United Kingdom	London	Heathrow Airport	Ends 25 October 2026	
United Kingdom	Manchester	Manchester Airport	Terminated	
Uzbekistan	Tashkent	Islam Karimov Tashkent International Airport		
Vietnam	Hanoi	Noi Bai International Airport		
Vietnam	Ho Chi Minh City	Tan Son Nhat International Airport	Terminated	

== See also ==
- List of Air India Express destinations
- List of Alliance Air destinations
- List of SpiceJet destinations
