= List of Alliance Air destinations =

As of September 2023, Alliance Air flies to the following 72 destinations.

== Domestic destinations ==
State / union territory	City	Airport	Notes	Refs
Andhra Pradesh	Tirupati	Tirupati Airport		
Andhra Pradesh	Vijayawada	Vijayawada Airport		
Andhra Pradesh	Visakhapatnam	Visakhapatnam Airport	Terminated	
Arunachal Pradesh	Itanagar	Itanagar Airport		
Arunachal Pradesh	Pasighat	Pasighat Airport		
Arunachal Pradesh	Tezu	Tezu Airport		
Arunachal Pradesh	Ziro	Zero Airport		
Assam	Dibrugarh	Dibrugarh Airport		
Assam	Guwahati	Lokpriya Gopinath Bordoloi International Airport		
Assam	North Lakhimpur	Lilabari Airport		
Assam	Silchar	Silchar Airport		
Assam	Tezpur	Tezpur Airport		
Chandigarh	Chandigarh	Shaheed Bhagat Singh International Airport		
Chhattisgarh	Bilaspur	Bilaspur Airport		
Chhattisgarh	Jagdalpur	Jagdalpur Airport		
Chhattisgarh	Raipur	Swami Vivekananda Airport		
Daman and Diu	Diu	Diu Airport		
Delhi	Delhi	Indira Gandhi International Airport	Hub	
Goa	Goa	Dabolim Airport		
Gujarat	Ahmedabad	Sardar Vallabhbhai Patel International Airport		
Gujarat	Bhavnagar	Bhavnagar Airport		
Gujarat	Bhuj	Bhuj Airport		
Gujarat	Keshod	Keshod Airport		
Gujarat	Surat	Surat Airport		
Haryana	Hisar	Hisar Airport		
Himachal Pradesh	Dharamshala	Kangra Airport		
Himachal Pradesh	Kullu	Kullu–Manali Airport		
Himachal Pradesh	Shimla	Shimla Airport		
Jammu and Kashmir	Jammu	Jammu Airport		
Jharkhand	Ranchi	Birsa Munda Airport		
Karnataka	Ballari	Jindal Vijaynagar Airport		
Karnataka	Bangalore	Kempegowda International Airport	Hub	
Karnataka	Belgaum	Belgaum Airport	Terminated	
Karnataka	Gulbarga	Kalaburagi Airport	Terminated	
Karnataka	Hubli	Hubli Airport	Terminated	
Karnataka	Mangalore	Mangalore International Airport	Terminated	
Karnataka	Mysore	Mysore Airport	Terminated	
Kerala	Kochi	Cochin International Airport		
Kerala	Kozhikode	Calicut International Airport		
Lakshadweep	Agatti	Agatti Airport		
Madhya Pradesh	Bhopal	Raja Bhoj Airport		
Madhya Pradesh	Gwalior	Gwalior Airport		
Madhya Pradesh	Indore	Devi Ahilya Bai Holkar Airport		
Madhya Pradesh	Jabalpur	Jabalpur Airport		
Madhya Pradesh	Rewa	Rewa Airport		
Maharashtra	Mumbai	Chhatrapati Shivaji Maharaj International Airport	Hub	
Maharashtra	Shirdi	Shirdi Airport		
Maharashtra	Amravati	Amravati Airport		
Maharashtra	Sindhudurg	Sindhudurg Airport		
Maharashtra	Kolhapur	Kolhapur Airport	Terminated	
Maharashtra	Nashik	Nashik Airport		
Maharashtra	Pune	Pune Airport		
Manipur	Imphal	Imphal Airport		
Meghalaya	Shillong	Shillong Airport		
Mizoram	Aizawl	Aizawl Airport		
Nagaland	Dimapur	Dimapur Airport		
Odisha	Bhubaneswar	Biju Patnaik Airport		
Odisha	Jharsuguda	Jharsuguda Airport		
Odisha	Rourkela	Rourkela Airport		
Punjab	Amritsar	Sri Guru Ram Dass Jee International Airport		
Punjab	Bathinda	Bathinda Airport		
Punjab	Ludhiana	Ludhiana Airport	Terminated	
Punjab	Pathankot	Pathankot Airport	Terminated	
Rajasthan	Bikaner	Bikaner Airport		
Rajasthan	Jaipur	Jaipur International Airport	Hub	
Rajasthan	Jaisalmer	Jaisalmer Airport	Seasonal	
Rajasthan	Udaipur	Maharana Pratap Airport		
Tamil Nadu	Chennai	Chennai International Airport	Hub	
Tamil Nadu	Coimbatore	Coimbatore International Airport	Terminated	
Tamil Nadu	Madurai	Madurai Airport	Terminated	
Tamil Nadu	Salem	Salem Airport		
Tamil Nadu	Tiruchirappalli	Tiruchirappalli International Airport	Terminated	
Telangana	Hyderabad	Rajiv Gandhi International Airport	Hub	
Uttar Pradesh	Ayodhya	Ayodhya Airport		
Uttar Pradesh	Bareilly	Bareilly Airport		
Uttar Pradesh	Gorakhpur	Gorakhpur Airport		
Uttar Pradesh	Lucknow	Chaudhary Charan Singh International Airport		
Uttar Pradesh	Prayagraj	Prayagraj Airport		
Uttar Pradesh	Varanasi	Lal Bahadur Shastri Airport		
Uttarakhand	Dehradun	Dehradun Airport		
West Bengal	Kolkata	Netaji Subhas Chandra Bose International Airport	Hub	

== International destinations ==
Country	City	Airport	Notes	Refs
Sri Lanka	Jaffna	Jaffna International Airport	Terminated	

== See also ==
- Air India destinations
- Air India Express destinations
