= List of SpiceJet destinations =

Destinations served by the SpiceJet airline

As of January 2024, SpiceJet flies to a total of 63 destinations, including 53 domestic and 10 international destinations.

== List ==
Country (state)	City	Airport	Notes	Refs
Hong Kong	Hong Kong	Hong Kong International Airport	Cargo	
India (Andaman and Nicobar Islands)	Port Blair	Veer Savarkar International Airport	Terminated	
India (Andhra Pradesh)	Rajahmundry	Rajahmundry Airport	Terminated	
India (Andhra Pradesh)	Tirupati	Tirupati Airport	Terminated	
India (Andhra Pradesh)	Vijayawada	Vijayawada International Airport	Terminated	
India (Andhra Pradesh)	Visakhapatnam	Visakhapatnam International Airport	Terminated	
India (Assam)	Dibrugarh	Dibrugarh Airport	Terminated	
India (Assam)	Guwahati	Lokpriya Gopinath Bordoloi International Airport	Terminated	
India (Assam)	Jorhat	Jorhat Airport	Terminated	
India (Assam)	Silchar	Silchar Airport	Terminated	
India (Assam)	Tezpur	Tezpur Airport	Terminated	
India (Bihar)	Darbhanga	Darbhanga Airport		
India (Bihar)	Patna	Jay Prakash Narayan Airport		
India (Chandigarh)	Chandigarh	Chandigarh Airport	Terminated	
India (Delhi)	Delhi	Indira Gandhi International Airport	Base	
India (Goa)	Dabolim	Dabolim Airport	Terminated	
India (Goa)	Mopa	Manohar International Airport	Terminated	
India (Gujarat)	Ahmedabad	Sardar Vallabhbhai Patel International Airport		
India (Gujarat)	Kandla	Kandla Airport	Terminated	
India (Gujarat)	Porbandar	Porbandar Airport	Terminated	
India (Gujarat)	Bhavnagar	Bhavnagar Airport	Terminated	
India (Gujarat)	Rajkot	Rajkot Airport	Terminated	
India (Gujarat)	Surat	Surat International Airport	Terminated	
India (Himachal Pradesh)	Dharamsala	Kangra Airport		
India (Jammu and Kashmir)	Jammu	Jammu Airport		
India (Jammu and Kashmir)	Srinagar	Srinagar Airport		
India (Jharkhand)	Ranchi	Birsa Munda Airport	Terminated	
India (Karnataka)	Bangalore	Kempegowda International Airport		
India (Karnataka)	Belgaum	Belgaum Airport	Terminated	
India (Karnataka)	Hubli	Hubli Airport	Terminated	
India (Karnataka)	Mangalore	Mangalore International Airport	Terminated	
India (Karnataka)	Shimoga	Shivamogga Airport		
India (Kerala)	Kochi	Cochin International Airport		
India (Kerala)	Kozhikode	Calicut International Airport		
India (Kerala)	Trivandrum	Trivandrum International Airport	Terminated	
India (Ladakh)	Leh	Kushok Bakula Rimpochee Airport		
India (Madhya Pradesh)	Bhopal	Raja Bhoj Airport	Terminated	
India (Madhya Pradesh)	Gwalior	Gwalior Airport	Terminated	
India (Madhya Pradesh)	Jabalpur	Jabalpur Airport	Terminated	
India (Maharashtra)	Mumbai	Chhatrapati Shivaji Maharaj International Airport		
India (Maharashtra)	Nashik	Nashik Airport	Terminated	
India (Maharashtra)	Pune	Pune Airport		
India (Maharashtra)	Shirdi	Shirdi Airport	Terminated	
India (Meghalaya)	Shillong	Shillong Airport		
India (Odisha)	Jharsuguda	Veer Surendra Sai Airport	Terminated	
India (Pondicherry)	Pondicherry	Pondicherry Airport	Terminated	
India (Punjab)	Amritsar	Sri Guru Ram Dass Jee International Airport	Terminated	
India (Punjab)	Jalandhar	Adampur Airport	Terminated	
India (Rajasthan)	Ajmer	Kishangarh Airport	Terminated	
India (Rajasthan)	Jaipur	Jaipur International Airport		
India (Rajasthan)	Jaisalmer	Jaisalmer Airport	Terminated	
India (Rajasthan)	Jodhpur	Jodhpur Airport	Seasonal	
India (Rajasthan)	Udaipur	Maharana Pratap Airport	Seasonal	
India (Sikkim)	Gangtok	Pakyong Airport	Terminated	
India (Tamil Nadu)	Chennai	Chennai International Airport		
India (Tamil Nadu)	Coimbatore	Coimbatore International Airport	Terminated	
India (Tamil Nadu)	Madurai	Madurai International Airport	Terminated	
India (Tamil Nadu)	Thoothukudi	Tuticorin Airport	Terminated	
India (Telangana)	Hyderabad	Rajiv Gandhi International Airport	Base	
India (Uttarakhand)	Dehradun	Dehradun Airport	Terminated	
India (Uttar Pradesh)	Ayodhya	Ayodhya International Airport	Seasonal	
India (Uttar Pradesh)	Gorakhpur	Gorakhpur Airport		
India (Uttar Pradesh)	Kanpur	Kanpur Airport	Terminated	
India (Uttar Pradesh)	Kushinagar	Kushinagar International Airport	Terminated	
India (Uttar Pradesh)	Prayagraj	Prayagraj Airport	Terminated	
India (Uttar Pradesh)	Varanasi	Lal Bahadur Shastri Airport		
India (West Bengal)	Bagdogra	Bagdogra Airport		
India (West Bengal)	Durgapur	Kazi Nazrul Islam Airport	Terminated	
India (West Bengal)	Kolkata	Netaji Subhas Chandra Bose International Airport		
Iraq	Najaf	Al Najaf International Airport	Terminated	
Italy	Bergamo	Milan Bergamo Airport	Terminated	
Italy	Rome	Rome Fiumicino Airport	Terminated	
Nepal	Kathmandu	Tribhuvan International Airport	Terminated	
Saudi Arabia	Jeddah	King Abdulaziz International Airport	Terminated	
Saudi Arabia	Riyadh	King Khalid International Airport	Terminated	
Sri Lanka	Colombo	Bandaranaike International Airport	Terminated	
Thailand	Bangkok	Suvarnabhumi Airport	Terminated	
Thailand	Phuket	Phuket International Airport		
United Arab Emirates	Dubai	Dubai International Airport		
United Arab Emirates	Sharjah	Sharjah International Airport	Terminated	
United Arab Emirates	Fujairah	Fujairah International Airport	Seasonal	

== See also ==
- List of Air India Express destinations
- List of Alliance Air destinations
- List of IndiGo destinations
