= List of Air India destinations =

Air India is the flag carrier of India, and was founded by JRD Tata of Tata Sons. It is based in New Delhi, and currently operates hubs in Delhi, Mumbai, and Bengaluru, with various focus cities across India.

Air India commenced operations on 29 July 1967, operating under the Government of India. On 8 June 1944, a Lockheed Constelation L-749A named Malabar Princess operated these airlines as the first international flight between Mumbai and London Heathrow.

Air India serves a total of 43 international and 46 domestic destinations. Its network spans across various destinations in 33 countries in Asia, North America, Africa, Europe and Oceania. The countries served the most by the airline are the United States with four destinations, followed by Saudi Arabia and the United Kingdom with three destinations each. Currently, the longest flight operated by Air India is between San Francisco and Delhi using the 777-300ER.

This list does not contain destinations served by subsidiary Air India Express.

== List ==
Country (state)	City	Airport	Notes	Refs
Afghanistan	Kabul	Kabul International Airport	Terminated	
Australia	Darwin	Darwin International Airport	Terminated	
Australia	Melbourne	Melbourne Airport		
Australia	Perth	Perth Airport	Terminated	
Australia	Sydney	Sydney Airport		
Austria	Vienna	Vienna International Airport	Ends 31 October 2026	
Bahrain	Manama	Bahrain International Airport	Terminated	
Bangladesh	Dhaka	Hazrat Shahjalal International Airport		
Belgium	Brussels	Brussels Airport	Terminated	
Canada	Montreal	Montréal–Mirabel International Airport	Airport closed	
Canada	Toronto	Toronto Pearson International Airport		
Canada	Vancouver	Vancouver International Airport		
China	Shanghai	Shanghai Pudong International Airport		
Czech Republic	Prague	Václav Havel Airport Prague	Terminated	
Denmark	Copenhagen	Copenhagen Airport	Terminated	
Egypt	Cairo	Cairo International Airport	Terminated	
Ethiopia	Addis Ababa	Addis Ababa Bole International Airport	Terminated	
France	Paris	Charles de Gaulle Airport		
Fiji	Nadi	Nadi International Airport	Terminated	
Germany	Düsseldorf	Düsseldorf Airport	Terminated	
Germany	Frankfurt	Frankfurt Airport		
Ghana	Accra	Accra International Airport	Terminated	
Hong Kong	Hong Kong	Hong Kong International Airport		
Hong Kong	Hong Kong	Kai Tak Airport	Airport closed	
India (Andaman and Nicobar Islands)	Port Blair	Veer Savarkar International Airport		
India (Andhra Pradesh)	Tirupati	Tirupati Airport		
India (Andhra Pradesh)	Vijayawada	Vijayawada International Airport		
India (Andhra Pradesh)	Visakhapatnam	Alluri Sitarama Raju International Airport		
India (Assam)	Dibrugarh	Dibrugarh Airport	Terminated	
India (Assam)	Guwahati	Lokpriya Gopinath Bordoloi International Airport		
India (Assam)	Silchar	Silchar Airport	Terminated	
India (Bihar)	Gaya	Gaya Airport		
India (Bihar)	Patna	Jay Prakash Narayan Airport		
India (Chandigarh)	Chandigarh	Chandigarh Airport		
India (Delhi)	Delhi	Indira Gandhi International Airport	Hub	
India (Goa)	Dabolim	Dabolim Airport		
India (Goa)	Mopa	Manohar International Airport		
India (Gujarat)	Ahmedabad	Sardar Vallabhbhai Patel International Airport	Focus city	
India (Gujarat)	Bhuj	Bhuj Airport		
India (Gujarat)	Jamnagar	Jamnagar Airport		
India (Gujarat)	Rajkot	Rajkot Airport	Airport closed	
India (Gujarat)	Rajkot	Rajkot International Airport		
India (Gujarat)	Surat	Surat International Airport	Terminated	
India (Gujarat)	Vadodara	Vadodara Airport		
India (Jammu and Kashmir)	Jammu	Jammu Airport		
India (Jammu and Kashmir)	Srinagar	Srinagar Airport		
India (Jharkhand)	Ranchi	Birsa Munda Airport	Terminated	
India (Karnataka)	Belgaum	Belgaum Airport	Terminated	
India (Karnataka)	Bengaluru	Kempegowda International Airport	Hub	
India (Karnataka)	Hubli	Hubli Airport	Terminated	
India (Karnataka)	Mangalore	Mangalore International Airport	Terminated	
India (Kerala)	Kannur	Kannur International Airport	Terminated	
India (Kerala)	Kochi	Cochin International Airport	Focus city	
India (Kerala)	Kozhikode	Calicut International Airport	Terminated	
India (Kerala)	Thiruvananthapuram	Thiruvananthapuram International Airport	Focus city	
India (Ladakh)	Leh	Kushok Bakula Rimpochee Airport		
India (Madhya Pradesh)	Bhopal	Raja Bhoj Airport		
India (Madhya Pradesh)	Indore	Devi Ahilya Bai Holkar Airport		
India (Madhya Pradesh)	Khajuraho	Khajuraho Airport	Resumes 25 October 2026	
India (Maharashtra)	Aurangabad	Aurangabad Airport		
India (Maharashtra)	Mumbai	Chhatrapati Shivaji Maharaj International Airport	Hub	
India (Maharashtra)	Nagpur	Dr. Babasaheb Ambedkar International Airport		
India (Maharashtra)	Pune	Pune Airport		
India (Manipur)	Imphal	Imphal Airport		
India (Mizoram)	Aizawl	Lengpui Airport	Terminated	
India (Nagaland)	Dimapur	Dimapur Airport	Terminated	
India (Odisha)	Bhubaneswar	Biju Patnaik Airport		
India (Punjab)	Amritsar	Sri Guru Ram Dass Jee International Airport		
India (Punjab)	Ludhiana	Ludhiana Halwara International Airport		
India (Rajasthan)	Jaipur	Jaipur International Airport		
India (Rajasthan)	Jaisalmer	Jaisalmer Airport		
India (Rajasthan)	Jodhpur	Jodhpur Airport		
India (Rajasthan)	Udaipur	Maharana Pratap Airport		
India (Tamil Nadu)	Chennai	Chennai International Airport	Focus city	
India (Tamil Nadu)	Coimbatore	Coimbatore International Airport		
India (Tamil Nadu)	Madurai	Madurai International Airport		
India (Telangana)	Hyderabad	Rajiv Gandhi International Airport	Focus city	
India (Tripura)	Agartala	Maharaja Bir Bikram Airport	Terminated	
India (Uttarakhand)	Dehradun	Dehradun Airport		
India (Uttar Pradesh)	Agra	Agra Airport	Terminated	
India (Uttar Pradesh)	Lucknow	Chaudhary Charan Singh International Airport		
India (Uttar Pradesh)	Prayagraj	Prayagraj Airport	Terminated	
India (Uttar Pradesh)	Varanasi	Lal Bahadur Shastri Airport		
India (West Bengal)	Bagdogra	Bagdogra Airport		
India (West Bengal)	Durgapur	Kazi Nazrul Islam Airport	Terminated	
India (West Bengal)	Kolkata	Netaji Subhas Chandra Bose International Airport	Focus city	
Indonesia	Denpasar	Ngurah Rai International Airport		
Indonesia	Jakarta	Soekarno–Hatta International Airport	Terminated	
Iran	Tehran	Mehrabad International Airport	Terminated	
Iraq	Baghdad	Baghdad International Airport	Terminated	
Iraq	Najaf	Al Najaf International Airport	Terminated	
Israel	Tel Aviv	David Ben Gurion Airport	Resumes 1 December 2026	
Italy	Milan	Milan Malpensa Airport		
Italy	Rome	Rome Fiumicino Airport		
Japan	Osaka	Kansai International Airport	Resumes 2 February 2027	
Japan	Tokyo	Haneda International Airport		
Japan	Tokyo	Narita International Airport	Terminated	
Kenya	Nairobi	Jomo Kenyatta International Airport	Terminated	
Kuwait	Kuwait City	Kuwait International Airport		
Lebanon	Beirut	Beirut–Rafic Hariri International Airport	Terminated	
Malaysia	Kuala Lumpur	Kuala Lumpur International Airport		
Maldives	Malé	Velana International Airport		
Mauritius	Plaine Magnien	Sir Seewoosagur Ramgoolam International Airport		
Myanmar	Yangon	Yangon International Airport		
Nepal	Kathmandu	Tribhuvan International Airport		
Netherlands	Amsterdam	Amsterdam Airport Schiphol		
Nigeria	Lagos	Murtala Muhammed International Airport	Terminated	
Oman	Muscat	Muscat International Airport	Terminated	
Pakistan	Karachi	Jinnah International Airport	Terminated	
Pakistan	Lahore	Allama Iqbal International Airport	Terminated	
Philippines	Manila	Ninoy Aquino International Airport		
Qatar	Doha	Doha International Airport	Airport closed	
Qatar	Doha	Hamad International Airport		
Russia	Moscow	Moscow Domodedovo Airport	Terminated	
Russia	Moscow	Sheremetyevo International Airport	Terminated	
Saudi Arabia	Dammam	King Fahd International Airport		
Saudi Arabia	Dhahran	Dhahran International Airport	Airport closed	
Saudi Arabia	Jeddah	King Abdulaziz International Airport		
Saudi Arabia	Riyadh	King Khalid International Airport		
Seychelles	Victoria	Seychelles International Airport	Terminated	
Singapore	Singapore	Changi Airport		
South Africa	Durban	Durban International Airport	Terminated	
South Africa	Johannesburg	O. R. Tambo International Airport	Terminated	
South Korea	Seoul	Incheon International Airport		
Spain	Madrid	Adolfo Suárez Madrid–Barajas Airport	Terminated	
Sri Lanka	Colombo	Bandaranaike International Airport		
Sweden	Stockholm	Stockholm Arlanda Airport	Terminated	
Switzerland	Geneva	Geneva Airport	Terminated	
Switzerland	Zurich	Zurich Airport		
Syria	Damascus	Damascus International Airport	Terminated	
Tanzania	Dar Es Salaam	Julius Nyerere International Airport	Terminated	
Thailand	Bangkok	Don Mueang International Airport	Terminated	
Thailand	Bangkok	Suvarnabhumi Airport		
Thailand	Phuket	Phuket International Airport		
Uganda	Entebbe	Entebbe International Airport	Terminated	
United Arab Emirates	Abu Dhabi	Zayed International Airport	Terminated	
United Arab Emirates	Al Ain	Al Ain International Airport	Terminated	
United Arab Emirates	Dubai	Dubai International Airport		
United Arab Emirates	Fujairah	Fujairah International Airport	Terminated	
United Arab Emirates	Ras Al Khaimah	Ras Al Khaimah International Airport	Terminated	
United Arab Emirates	Sharjah	Sharjah International Airport	Terminated	
United Kingdom	Birmingham	Birmingham Airport		
United Kingdom	London	Gatwick Airport		
United Kingdom	London	Heathrow Airport		
United Kingdom	London	London Stansted Airport	Terminated	
United Kingdom	Manchester	Manchester Airport	Terminated	
United States	Chicago	O'Hare International Airport		
United States	Los Angeles	Los Angeles International Airport	Terminated	
United States	Newark	Newark Liberty International Airport		
United States	New York City	John F. Kennedy International Airport		
United States	San Francisco	San Francisco International Airport		
United States	Washington, D.C.	Washington Dulles International Airport	Terminated	
Uzbekistan	Tashkent	Tashkent International Airport	Terminated	
Vietnam	Hanoi	Noi Bai International Airport		
Vietnam	Ho Chi Minh City	Tan Son Nhat International Airport		
Yemen	Aden	Aden International Airport	Terminated	
Yemen	Sanaa	Sanaa International Airport	Terminated	
Zambia	Lusaka	Kenneth Kaunda International Airport	Terminated	
Zimbabwe	Harare	Robert Gabriel Mugabe International Airport	Terminated	

== See also ==
- Air India Express destinations
- Alliance Air destinations
