= List of airports in Madhya Pradesh =

This is a list of airports in Madhya Pradesh state in India.

== Airports ==
Sl. no.	Location	ICAO	IATA	Airport	Type
1	Gwalior	VAGR	GWL	Rajmata Vijayraje Raje Scindia Terminal	Domestic
2	Datia	VIDT	DPP	Datia Airport	Domestic
3	Indore	VAIR	IDR	Devi Ahilyabai Holkar (DABH) airport	International
4	Bhopal	VABP	BHO	Raja Bhoj Airport	International (seasonal)
5	Jabalpur	VAJB	JLR	Dumna Airport	Domestic
6	Khajuraho, Chhatarpur	VAKJ	HJR	Khajuraho Airport	Domestic
7	Rewa	VA1G	REW	Rewa Airport	Domestic
8	Satna	VEST	TNI	Satna Airport	Domestic
9	Panna			Panna Airstrip	
10	Sagar	VA1J		Dhana Airstrip	
11	Khandwa	VAKD	IN-0061	Khandwa Airstrip	
12	Ujjain			Ujjain Airstrip	
13	Ratlam			Ratlam Airstrip	
14	Nagda			Nagda Airstrip	
15	Harda		IN-0047	Harda Airstrip	
16	Guna			Guna Airstrip	
17	Chhindwara		IN-0086	Chhindwara Airstrip	
