= Dhana Airport =

Airport in Sagar, Madhya Pradesh, India

- IATA: none; ICAO: VA1J

Summary
- Airport type: State Government owned
- Operator: Chimes Aviation Private Limited (on lease)
- Location: Dhana, Sagar, Madhya Pradesh, India
- Elevation AMSL: 1,709 ft / 521 m
- Coordinates: 23°45′14″N 78°51′21″E

Map
- Location of the airport in Madhya Pradesh Dhana Airport (India)

Runways
Direction	Length		Surface
Direction	ft	m	Surface
17/35	3,180	969	Asphalt

The Dhana Airstrip is located in Dhana, in Sagar District, Madhya Pradesh, India, and is near to Sagar, Damoh, Khurai and Bina. Dhana airport is the home base of Chimes Aviation Academy (CAA). It has a 3000-foot asphalt runway with runway lights installed by CAA. The apron area can accommodate 10–12 small aircraft. It also has a helipad.

CAA operates seven Cessna 172s, one Piper Seneca and a DA 42 on this airfield. CAA have a 140 by 100 foot hangar in the airfield. Other than CAA, the airfield is often used by Madhya Pradesh Government Aviation and VIP charter aircraft as well as Medical evacuation flights.

Apart from a government rest house inside the airfield, a cafeteria and a visitors lounge of CAA are also available.

There are no radio navigation aids available, the runway orientation is 352–172 (35–17) and there was a 20 to 30 foot power line obstruction at the approach of runway 35 till 2012, which was later removed by replacing the overhead cable with an underground power cable under initiatives of Chimes Aviation Private Limited.

Night operations are limited to local training flights of CAA. Weather is usually stable, with strong cross winds. The air traffic control (ATC) is staffed during normal working hours. The frequency is 122.6 MHz.

== See also ==
- List of airports in India
- List of airports in Madhya Pradesh
- Sagar District
