= Pasighat Airport =

Airport of Arunachal Pradesh, India

- IATA: IXT; ICAO: VEPG

Summary
- Airport type: Public
- Operator: Airports Authority of India
- Serves: Pasighat
- Location: Pasighat, Arunachal Pradesh, India
- Opened: 1962; 64 years ago
- Elevation AMSL: 157 m (515 ft)
- Coordinates: 28°04′06.5″N 095°20′04.3″E

Map
- Location within Arunachal Pradesh Location within India

Runways
Direction	Length		Surface
Direction	m	ft	Surface
16/34	2,060	6,760	Asphalt

Statistics (April 2025 - March 2026)
- Passengers: 4,938 (▼ -41.6%)
- Aircraft movements: 258 (▼ -25.9%)
- Cargo tonnage: —
- Source: AAI

Pasighat Airport (IATA: IXT, ICAO: VEPG) is a domestic airport serving Pasighat, Arunachal Pradesh, India. It is located on the banks of the Brahmaputra River almost parallel to the river, about 3 km (1.9 mi) away from the town centre.

== History ==
The airstrip was constructed during the Sino-Indian War of 1962 and saw little use after the war until the Indian Air Force signed a Memorandum of Understanding (MoU) with the state government to develop the airstrip in 2009. The IAF took over the airstrip in February 2010. An Air Traffic Control Tower, an apron for parking aircraft, a perimeter road and a security wall were constructed. The upgraded airstrip was inaugurated by Kiren Rijiju in August 2016 and a Sukhoi Su-30MKI fighter of the Indian Air Force landed on the airstrip as part of the inaugural function.

== Current status ==
- The Airports Authority of India (AAI) operates a civil enclave at Pasighat. A new passenger terminal was built in 2017. A helicopter service on behalf of the Arunachal Pradesh government is operated by Pawan Hans between Pasighat and various regional stations.
- In April 2018, an Air India Regional ATR-42 aircraft carried out a test landing at the Pasighat ALG, in preparation for scheduled commercial services. The commercial flights commenced on 21 May 2018 when Alliance Air (India)'s 42-seater ATR aircraft from Guwahati landed at the airport with Chief Minister Pema Khandu and Deputy Chief Minister Chowna Mein. The connectivity comes under the Government's Regional Connectivity Scheme called UDAN.

== Airlines and destinations ==
Airlines	Destinations
Alliance Air	Guwahati, Itanagar

== See also ==
- Itanagar Airport
- Tezu Airport
- Zero Airport
