= Tezu Airport =

Airport of Arunachal Pradesh, India

- IATA: TEI; ICAO: VETJ

Summary
- Airport type: Public
- Operator: Airports Authority of India
- Serves: Lohit district
- Location: Tezu, Arunachal Pradesh, India
- Elevation AMSL: 769 ft (234 m)
- Coordinates: 27.9422°N 96.1339°E
- Website: Tezu Airport

Map
- Location of airport in Arunachal Pradesh TEI (India)

Runways
Direction	Length		Surface
Direction	ft	m	Surface
04/22	4,921	1,500	Concrete

Statistics (April 2025 - March 2026)
- Passengers: 16,080 (▲74%)
- Aircraft movements: 610 (▲31.7)
- Cargo tonnage: —
- Source: AAI

Tezu Airport (IATA: TEI, ICAO: VETJ) is a domestic airport serving the city of Tezu and adjoining Lohit district of Arunachal Pradesh, India. It is India's easternmost airport, operated by the Airports Authority of India (AAI), which upgraded it to handle ATR-72 aircraft with no night-landing facility. Prime Minister Narendra Modi inaugurated the upgraded airport on 9 February 2019. Scheduled commercial flights commenced from 19 August 2021. currently it provides VFR operations only during day time.

== Development ==
Tezu was one of five airports that were shortlisted in 2015 for the implementation of AAI's "no-frills model", which will provide only essential services needed to operationalise the airport without compromising on safety and security in any way. With an aim to ensure low cost of operation, the airport was to have no conveyor belts, no aerobridges and only the security hold area for departing passengers was likely to be air-conditioned.

In 2009–10, the upgrade of the airport, with runway extension at an estimated cost of ₹79 crore, was approved.

On 22 September 2017, a test flight landed on the runway after the airport was upgraded.

On 9 February 2019, Prime Minister, Narendra Modi, inaugurated the upgraded airport.

Soon after the opening of the upgraded airport, the Ministry of Civil Aviation announced that a new, bigger passenger terminal, a new Air Traffic Control (ATC)-cum-fire station complex, apron and runway extension would be done in a span of four years, as part of the airport's future development and the government's UDAN Scheme, also owing to the growing traffic and tourist arrivals in the state. The new terminal will cover an area of 4,000 sq.m. with a capacity of 300 passengers during peak hours. It will have five check-in counters, which will be increased to eight in the future. It will have a double-insulated roofing system, energy-efficient lighting systems, a solid waste management system, a water treatment plant and an integrated rainwater harvesting plant.

The works commenced in mid-2019, and the airport was inaugurated again, this time by the Minister of Civil Aviation, Jyotiraditya Scindia, and the Chief Minister of Arunachal Pradesh, Pema Khandu, on 24 September 2023.

== Facilities ==
The airport has a 1,500 m long runway, oriented 04/22, an apron for parking of two ATR-72 type aircraft, a passenger terminal building of 4,000 m² area, capable of handling 300 passengers during peak hours. It has five check-in counters, which will be increased to eight in the future. It has a double-insulated roofing system, energy-efficient lighting systems, a solid waste management system, a water treatment plant and an integrated rainwater harvesting plant. Other features include an Air Traffic Control (ATC) tower, a parking lot and ancillary facilities like a fire station and a fuel station.

== Scheduled commercial operations ==
Guwahati-Tezu-Guwahati scheduled commercial domestic flights operation commenced from 19 August 2021. The flight which takes 1 hour each way is operated by the FlyBig. This will boost the tourism in the region. Tezu is covered under the UDAN scheme.

Tezu is also an ALG of Indian Military. Other nearby airports include Dibrugarh Airport, Pasighat Airport, Zero Airport, Walong ALG and Itanagar Airport.

Currently an Alliance Air Dornier aircraft operates between TEZU and Hollongi on Tuesday & Thursday only. An Alliance Air ATR-76 connects Tezu with Guwahati, Jorhat & Imphal on Sunday, Monday, Wednesday and Friday.

== Airlines and destinations ==
Airlines	Destinations
Alliance Air	Guwahati, Itanagar, Jorhat, Imphal

== See also ==
- Pasighat Airport
- Tourism in Northeast India
- List of ALGs of India
- List of airports in India
