= Ujjain Airstrip =

- IATA: UJN; ICAO: none

Summary
- Airport type: Public/Private
- Owner: Government of Madhya Pradesh
- Serves: Ujjain
- Location: Ujjain, Madhya Pradesh
- Coordinates: 23°05′42″N 75°53′05″E

Map
- Location in Madhya Pradesh

Runways
Direction	Length		Surface
Direction	ft	m	Surface
13/31	3,562	1,100	Asphalt

Ujjain airstrip is a public airstrip owned by the Government of Madhya Pradesh located at Ujjain, Madhya Pradesh. The nearest airport/airstrip to this airport is Devi Ahilyabai Holkar International Airport in Indore. In 2013, Government of Madhya Pradesh started a Ujjain-Bhopal air service as a joint venture with Ventura Airconnect. Due to very low booking, the ambitious project was scrapped. The main reason for the failure of the plan was improper timing. The nine-seating capacity aircraft was in service.

== See also ==
- Ujjain Junction
- Devi Ahilya Bai Holkar Airport
