= Donyi Polo Airport, Itanagar =

Airport serving Itanagar, Arunachal Pradesh, India

Donyi Polo Airport
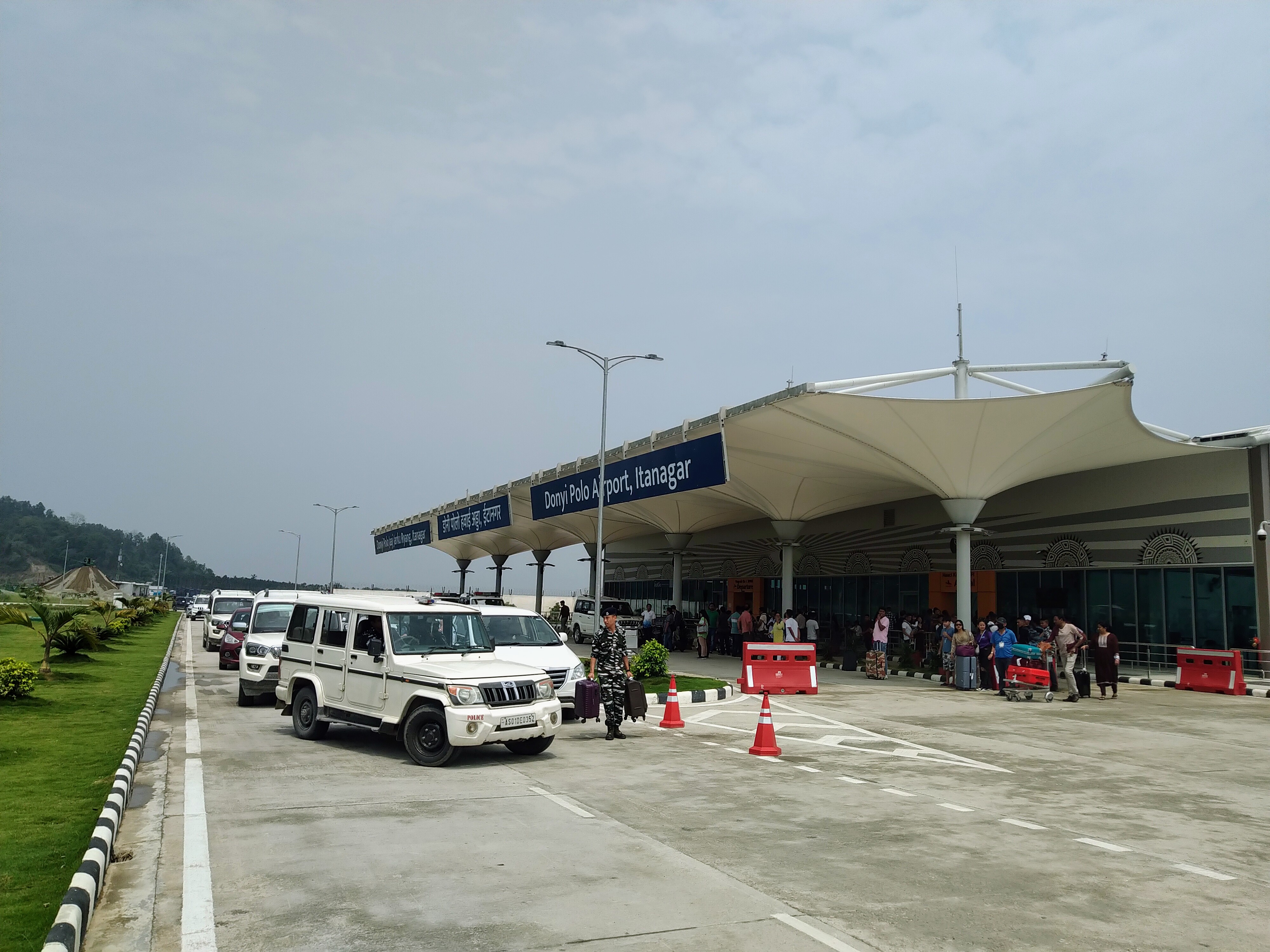
- IATA: HGI; ICAO: VEHO

Summary
- Airport type: Public
- Owner: Airports Authority of India
- Serves: Itanagar
- Location: Hollongi, Papum Pare district, Arunachal Pradesh, India
- Opened: 19 November 2022; 3 years ago
- Elevation AMSL: 328 ft (100 m)
- Coordinates: 26°58′12″N 93°39′53″E

Map
- Location of airport in Arunachal Pradesh HGI (India)

Runways
Direction	Length		Surface
Direction	ft	m	Surface
08/26	7,546	2,300	Concrete

Statistics (April 2025 – March 2026)
- Passengers: 1,99,823 (▲17.3%)
- Aircraft movements: 1,943 (▲17.5%)
- Cargo tonnage: 25.8 (▲ -%)
- Source: AAI

Donyi Polo Airport (IATA: HGI, ICAO: VEHO), also known as Hollongi Airport, is a domestic airport serving Itanagar, the capital city of Arunachal Pradesh, India. It is located at Hollongi, situated 14 km (8.7 mi) south from the city centre, in the Papum Pare district. It is built by the Airports Authority of India, over an area of 320 hectares. The airport is the 16th airport of Northeast India. Prime Minister Narendra Modi laid the foundation stone for the airport on 9 February 2019. Construction was started on 15 December 2020 and was inaugurated on 19 November 2022, with flight services started by IndiGo to Kolkata and Mumbai from 28 November 2022.

== History ==
In 2007, the Government of Arunachal Pradesh had chosen Banderdeva, situated 25 km from Itanagar, as a suitable location for the project. The then Home Minister, Shivraj Patil, laid the foundation stone on 20 February 2007 for the project. However, the technical committee of the Airports Authority of India (AAI) rejected the site and recommended Holongi as an alternative site for the project in 2011.

AAI had recommended Hollongi on grounds of operational safety, lower costs of construction and ease of future expansion. The Hollongi site lay on flat ground, had better usability in poor weather and offered scope for easy construction and expansion. The Banderdeva site, on the other hand, was surrounded by hilly terrain and permitted the operation of aircraft from only one direction.

The cost of construction was estimated at ₹ 980 crore for Banderdeva, as against ₹ 650 crore for the Hollongi site. The differences between AAI and the state government caused a dispute that resulted in the project getting delayed. The Prime Minister's Office (PMO) eventually stepped in to put an end to the dispute in July 2012 and the Hollongi site was finalised.

== Features ==
The airport has a single 2,300 metre runway oriented east–west in the first phase, to serve narrow-body aircraft and can be extended to 2,800 metres to land wide-body aircraft. The airport apron measures 160 metres by 115 metres linked to the runway by two taxiways. It has night landing facilities and navigation facilities like DVOR and Instrument Landing Systems.

== Construction ==
After the creation of the Detailed Project Report (DPR) by AAI, and the laying of the project's foundation stone, the contract for construction work of the project was awarded to Dineshchandra R. Agrawal Infracon Private Limited (DRA Infracon), who was given a period of 30 months to complete the airport, in February 2020.

== Airlines and destinations ==
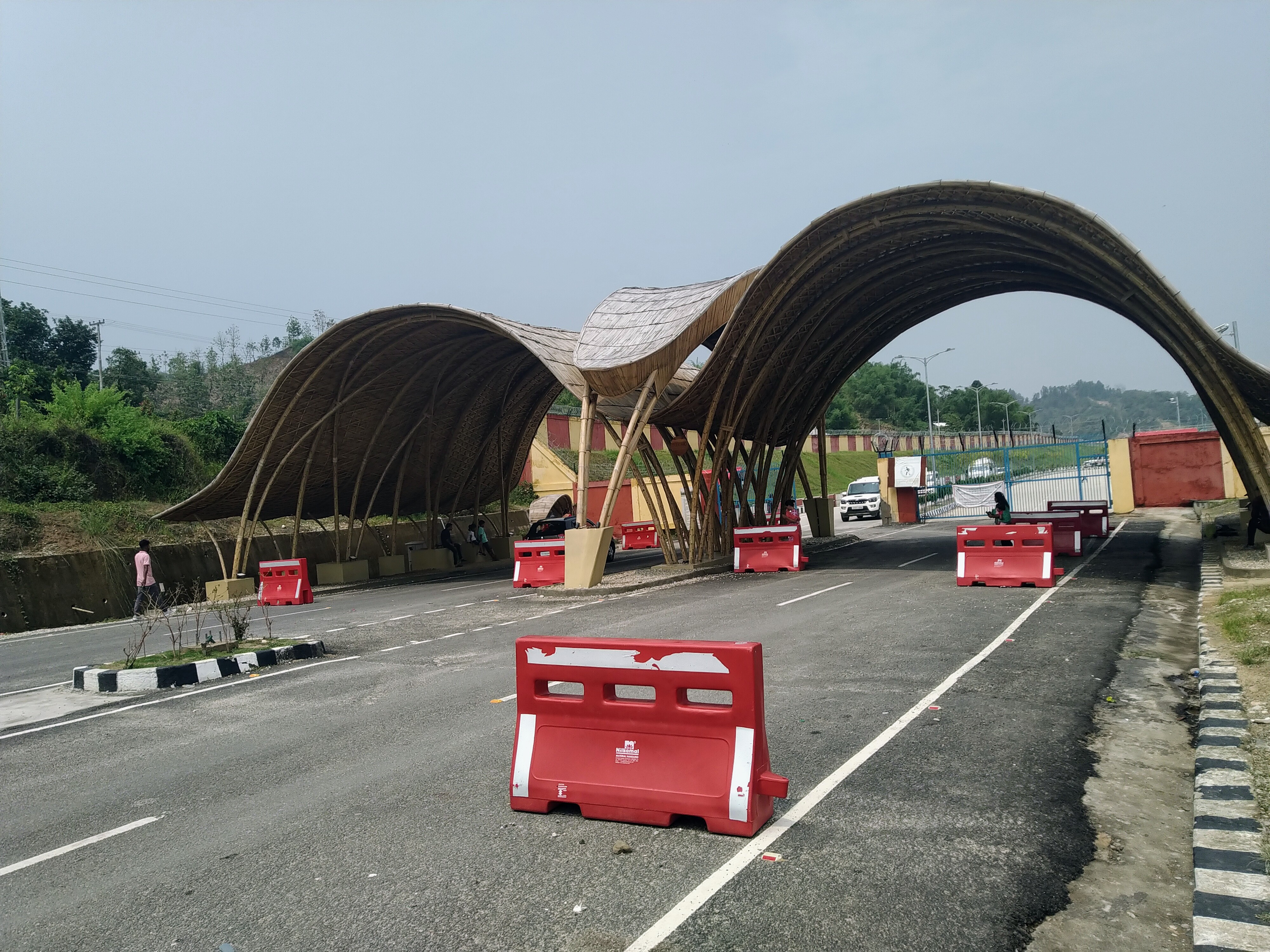
Entrance gate of airport

Airlines	Destinations	Refs.
Alliance Air	Guwahati, Tezu	
IndiGo	Delhi, Kolkata, Mumbai	

== See also ==
- Tezu Airport
- Pasighat Airport
- Zero Airport
- Pakyong Airport
