= Rewa Airport =

Domestic airport in Rewa, Madhya Pradesh, India

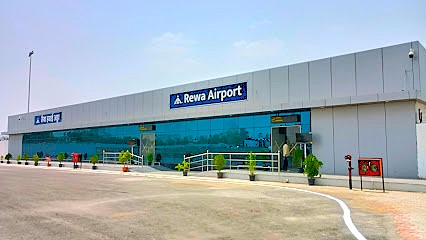
- IATA: REW; ICAO: VERW

Summary
- Airport type: Public
- Owner: Airports Authority of India
- Serves: Rewa
- Location: Chorhata, Rewa, Madhya Pradesh, India
- Time zone: Indian Standard Time (+5:30)
- Coordinates: 24°30′12″N 081°13′13″E
- Website: Rewa Airport

Map
- Location of airport in Madhya Pradesh REW (India)

Runways
Direction	Length		Surface
Direction	ft	m	Surface
07/25	5,905	1,800	Asphalt

Statistics (April 2025 - March 2026)
- Passengers: 20,690 (▲1,002.3%)
- Aircraft movements: 1,170 (▲80.6%)
- Cargo tonnage: 0 ( 0%)
- Source: AAI

Rewa Airport (IATA: REW, ICAO: VERW) is a domestic airport serving the city of Rewa in the state of Madhya Pradesh, India. It is located at Chorhata, 11 km (6.8 mi) away from the city centre. The airport is part of the government's UDAN regional connectivity scheme. It is connected by flights to Jabalpur and Singrauli under the PM Shri Tourism Air Services operated by the Madhya Pradesh Tourism Board (MPTB). Aliance air has started regular flights between Rewa & New Delhi operating direct flight thrice a week. IndiGo has announced daily flight between Rewa & Indore starting service from 22 December 2025.

== History ==
Rewa airstrip was built and owned by the State government of Madhya Pradesh and was used only by government, VIP, private aircraft and helicopters. At that time, the airstrip covered an area of about 62 acres, containing a runway of 1,400 metres with a small building of 150 sq.m. To boost connectivity and facilitate development in the Vindhya region, the State Government in 2016 demanded that the airstrip be converted into a full airport and that it be included in the Government's UDAN scheme.

In December 2022, the State Government handed it over the airstrip to the Airports Authority of India. The foundation stone for the expansion project was laid by the Civil Aviation Minister, Jyotiraditya Scindia and the Chief Minister of Madhya Pradesh, Shivraj Singh Chauhan on 15 February 2023. AAI planned an expansion to 290 acres for making the airport suitable for handling ATR-72 type aircraft operations in future. Out of 290 acres of land, 137 acres were required for VFR operations and 153 acres were required for IFR operations. The state cabinet approved the proposal to acquire 246 acres of private land and approved the compensation of ₹ 206 crore towards payment to the landowners. The total cost of the expansion project would be ₹ 300 crores and the total area of the under construction terminal building would be 750 sq.m. The expansion project completed by October 2024. The airport received approval from the DGCA in September 2024, making it the sixth operational airport in the State. Prime Minister Narendra Modi inaugurated the new terminal building on 20 October 2024.

== Airlines and destinations ==
Airlines	Destinations
Alliance Air	Bhopal, Delhi, Kolkata, Raipur
IndiGo	Indore
Flyola	Bhopal, Jabalpur

== See also ==
- List of busiest airports in India
- List of airports in Madhya Pradesh
- UDAN Scheme
