= List of Air India Express destinations =

Airports served by Air India Express

Air India Express is a low-cost carrier and wholly owned subsidiary of Air India, headquartered in Gurugram, Haryana. The airline was founded in 2005 and commenced operations on 29 April 2005, with inaugural flights launched simultaneously from Thiruvananthapuram, Kochi, and Kozhikode, connecting South India to the Middle East.

Air India Express remained state-owned, alongside its parent Air India, until 27 January 2022, when Tata Sons reacquired the Air India group. As part of the group's subsequent transformation programme, Tata Sons acquired full ownership of AirAsia India in November 2022, rebranding it as AIX Connect in October 2023; AIX Connect was then merged into Air India Express, with the combined carrier operating under the Air India Express name from 1 October 2024.

This list covers destinations served by Air India Express only; it does not cover destinations served by mainline Air India, which is covered separately in List of Air India destinations. Destinations are organised below by domestic and international scope, and within each by current and former status; current destinations are further annotated where they serve as an operating base ("hub") for the airline. As of September 2026, Air India Express serves 66 current destinations — 48 in India and 18 international — plus 2 formerly served international destinations.

The state with the most current destinations is Maharashtra with five, followed by Kerala and Tamil Nadu with four each, followed by Andhra Pradesh, Gujarat, Rajasthan and Uttar Pradesh with three each. The country with the most current international destinations is the United Arab Emirates with five, followed by Saudi Arabia with three, and Oman and Thailand with two each.

== Map ==
Current destination
Hub
Former destination

Air India Express destinations, current and former

== List ==
Destinations are split below into Current destinations, which Air India Express serves or has publicly announced service to, and Former destinations, which it no longer serves.

The key below applies to the Notes column in the Current destinations tables:

- No entry — currently served by Air India Express with no special designation.
- Hub
  — an operating base ("hub") for Air India Express.

=== Domestic ===
==== Current destinations ====
Domestic destinations currently served by Air India Express
State/UT	City	Airport	Notes	Refs
Andaman and Nicobar Islands	Sri Vijaya Puram (Port Blair)	Veer Savarkar International Airport		
Andhra Pradesh	Tirupati	Tirupati Airport		
Andhra Pradesh	Vijayawada	Vijayawada International Airport		
Andhra Pradesh	Visakhapatnam	Alluri Sitarama Raju International Airport		
Assam	Guwahati	Lokpriya Gopinath Bordoloi International Airport		
Assam	Dibrugarh	Dibrugarh Airport		
Bihar	Patna	Jay Prakash Narayan Airport		
Chandigarh	Chandigarh	Shaheed Bhagat Singh International Airport		
Delhi	Delhi	Indira Gandhi International Airport	Hub	
Goa	Dabolim	Dabolim Airport		
Goa	North Goa	Manohar International Airport		
Gujarat	Ahmedabad	Sardar Vallabhbhai Patel International Airport		
Gujarat	Jamnagar	Jamnagar Airport		
Gujarat	Surat	Surat Airport		
Jammu and Kashmir	Jammu	Jammu Airport		
Jammu and Kashmir	Srinagar	Srinagar Airport		
Jharkhand	Ranchi	Birsa Munda Airport		
Karnataka	Bengaluru	Kempegowda International Airport	Hub	
Karnataka	Mangaluru	Mangaluru International Airport		
Kerala	Kannur	Kannur International Airport		
Kerala	Kochi	Cochin International Airport		
Kerala	Kozhikode	Calicut International Airport		
Kerala	Thiruvananthapuram	Thiruvananthapuram International Airport		
Madhya Pradesh	Gwalior	Rajmata Vijayaraje Scindia Airport		
Madhya Pradesh	Indore	Devi Ahilya Bai Holkar Airport		
Maharashtra	Aurangabad	Aurangabad Airport		
Maharashtra	Mumbai	Chhatrapati Shivaji Maharaj International Airport	Hub	
Maharashtra	Mumbai	Navi Mumbai International Airport		
Maharashtra	Nagpur	Dr. Babasaheb Ambedkar International Airport		
Maharashtra	Pune	Pune Airport		
Manipur	Imphal	Bir Tikendrajit International Airport		
Nagaland	Dimapur	Dimapur Airport		
Odisha	Bhubhaneshwar	Biju Patnaik Airport		
Punjab	Amritsar	Sri Guru Ram Das Ji International Airport		
Rajasthan	Jaipur	Jaipur International Airport		
Rajasthan	Jodhpur	Jodhpur Airport		
Rajasthan	Udaipur	Maharana Pratap Airport		
Tamil Nadu	Chennai	Chennai International Airport		
Tamil Nadu	Coimbatore	Coimbatore International Airport		
Tamil Nadu	Madurai	Madurai International Airport		
Tamil Nadu	Tiruchirappalli	Tiruchirappalli International Airport		
Telangana	Hyderabad	Rajiv Gandhi International Airport		
Tripura	Agartala	Maharaja Bir Bikram Airport		
Uttar Pradesh	Ayodhya	Maharishi Valmiki International Airport		
Uttar Pradesh	Lucknow	Chaudhary Charan Singh International Airport		
Uttar Pradesh	Varanasi	Lal Bahadur Shastri Airport		
West Bengal	Bagdogra	Bagdogra Airport		
West Bengal	Kolkata	Netaji Subhas Chandra Bose International Airport		

=== International ===
==== Current destinations ====
International destinations currently served by Air India Express
Country	City	Airport	Notes	Refs
Bahrain	Manama	Bahrain International Airport		
Bangladesh	Dhaka	Hazrat Shahjalal International Airport		
Kuwait	Kuwait City	Kuwait International Airport		
Nepal	Kathmandu	Tribhuvan International Airport		
Oman	Muscat	Muscat International Airport		
Oman	Salalah	Salalah Airport		
Qatar	Doha	Hamad International Airport		
Saudi Arabia	Dammam	King Fahd International Airport		
Saudi Arabia	Jeddah	King Abdulaziz International Airport		
Saudi Arabia	Riyadh	King Khalid International Airport		
Singapore	Singapore	Changi International Airport		
Thailand	Bangkok	Suvarnabhumi Airport		
Thailand	Phuket	Phuket International Airport		
United Arab Emirates	Abu Dhabi	Zayed International Airport		
United Arab Emirates	Al Ain	Al Ain International Airport		
United Arab Emirates	Dubai	Dubai International Airport		
United Arab Emirates	Ras Al Khaimah	Ras Al Khaimah International Airport		
United Arab Emirates	Sharjah	Sharjah International Airport		

==== Former destinations ====
International destinations formerly served by Air India Express
Country	City	Airport	Reason	Refs
Malaysia	Kuala Lumpur	Kuala Lumpur International Airport		
Sri Lanka	Colombo	Bandaranaike International Airport		

== See also ==
- Air India destinations
- Alliance Air destinations
