= Jabalpur Airport =

Airport in Jabalpur, Madhya Pradesh India

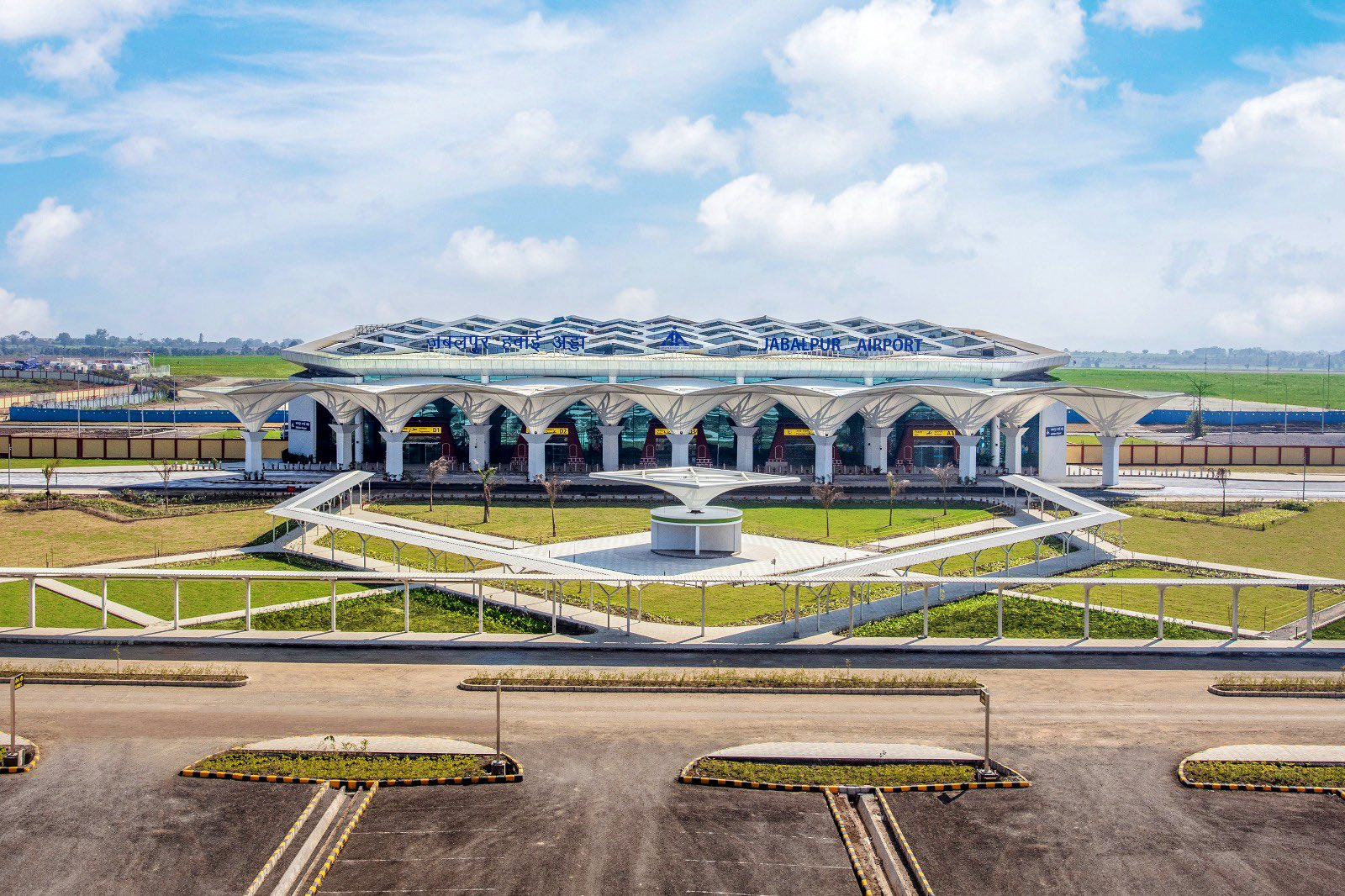
- IATA: JLR; ICAO: VAJB

Summary
- Airport type: Public
- Owner: Airports Authority of India
- Operator: Airports Authority of India
- Serves: Jabalpur
- Location: Dumna, Jabalpur, Madhya Pradesh, India
- Elevation AMSL: 1,624 ft (495 m)
- Coordinates: 23°11′05″N 080°03′31.5″E
- Website: Jabalpur Airport

Map
- Location in India JLR (India)

Runways
| Direction | Length | | Surface |
| Direction | ft | m | Surface |
|---|---|---|---|
| 06/24 | 9,022 | 2,750 | Asphalt |

Statistics (April 2025 - March 2026)
- Passengers: 5,14,641 (▲31%)
- Aircraft movements: 5,859 (▲17.2%)
- Cargo tonnage: 0 ( 0%)
- Source: AAI

Jabalpur Airport (IATA: JLR, ICAO: VAJB), also known as Dumna Airport, is a domestic airport serving the city of Jabalpur, Madhya Pradesh, India. It is located at Dumna, 25 km (16 mi) east of the city. It is the third busiest airport in Madhya Pradesh after Devi Ahilya Bai Holkar International Airport in Indore and Raja Bhoj Airport in Bhopal in terms of both passenger and aircraft movements. The Airports Authority of India (AAI) has upgraded the airport to provide better services to the air travellers of the region.

The airport serves the whole of eastern Madhya Pradesh, especially the Mahakaushal region. The tourists visiting Kanha National Park, Bandhavgarh National Park, Nauradehi Wildlife Sanctuary and Pench National Park can conveniently approach multiple National Parks of Madhya Pradesh keeping it as the centre point. The recently notified Veerangana Durgavati Tiger Reserve, the 7th tiger reserve in Madhya Pradesh also lies in close vicinity to Jabalpur and can be easily visited. Bhedaghat, Dhuandhar Falls, Amarkantak, Panchmarhi, and Khajuraho are easily accessible through Jabalpur. The airport is spread over an area of 960 acres (390 ha). Alliance Air, and IndiGo operate scheduled flight services to and from Jabalpur Airport.

== History ==
In 2015, the State government handed over 468.43 acres (189.57 ha) of land to the AAI for expansion of the airport. The new terminal building was commissioned on 10 March 2024, being built at a cost of Rs 412 crore.

== Facilities ==
=== Communication, navigation and surveillance ===
Airport has CNS/ATM facility like VHF, ATIS, DVR, AFTN, DVOR/DME, ADS-B, RCAG. ILS and Automation is going to be installed after completion of RWY expansion. Airport have also airport system and security facilities for APSUs like CCTV, X-ray machines, ETD, FIDS, PA SYSTEMS, DFMD, HHMD. The facilities are installed, operated, managed by CNS team of AAI.

=== Runway ===
The runway is capable of serving narrow body aircraft including Airbus A320/Boeing 737-800 and is equipped with night landing facilities, DVOR/DME, NDB and precision approach path indicator. It has a parking for four Airbus A320/Boeing 737 or four ATR-72 aircraft. ILS is under process after completion of runway expansion, by CNS team and ADS-B and RCAG is going to commissioned soon.

The newly expanded runway, 2,750 m (9,022 ft) long, was successfully trialed by a Delhi–Jabalpur IndiGo flight on 27 May 2023, and came under regular operation the next week. With the runway expansion, Jabalpur Airport is now home to the second longest runway in Madhya Pradesh, next only to that of Indore Airport (2,754 m or 9,035 ft) and ahead of the runways at Bhopal Airport (2,744 m or 9,003 ft), Gwalior Airport (2,743 m or 8,999 ft), and Khajuraho Airport (2,274 m or 7,461 ft).

== Expansion ==
The new terminal building, spread over an area of 115,180 sq.ft. (10,701 m^{2}), with a capacity to handle 800 passengers during peak hours is constructed and inaugurated by Prime Minister Narendra Modi through video conferencing on 10 March 2024. The terminal has three aerobridges, an advanced baggage screening system and a car parking for more than 250 cars and buses. The new terminal also includes the extension of runway to 2,750 metres (9,022 ft) from the current 1,988 metres (6,522 ft) with one end with ILS facility, a 14 km (8.7 mi) long boundary wall, a 5 km (3.1 mi) long approach road connecting airport to the city, a 32-metre (105 ft) high new Air Traffic Control (ATC) tower cum technical block, apron, taxiway, isolation bay and a fire station at a cost of Rs. 412 crores. Hence, the foundation stone was laid on 13 August 2018, by Suresh Prabhu, Jayant Sinha, Rakesh Singh amongst others. These upgrades were expected to be completed by December 2021, but due to the COVID-19 pandemic, which faced delays in work, it got delayed, and was finally completed and inaugurated on 10 March 2024.

== Airlines and destinations ==
| Airlines | Destinations |
|---|---|
| Alliance Air | Kolkata |

== Accidents and incidents ==
- On 4 December 2015, a Spicejet Bombardier Dash 8 Q400 registration VT-SUC, operating as Spicejet Flight 2458, was landing at Jabalpur when the aircraft collided with a herd of 30-40 wild boars. Three boars were killed and the aircraft skidded off the runway coming to a stop with the left gear collapsed, left engine damage, and other unknown damage caused by the impact. Despite the damage, no serious passenger injuries were reported
- On 12 March 2022, an Alliance Air ATR-72-600 with the registration VT-AIW operating Alliance Air flight 617, was landing on runway 06 when it overshot the runway and came to rest on the RESA. All 55 passengers and 5 crew were evacuated from the aircraft unharmed.

== See also ==
- List of airports in Madhya Pradesh
