= Khajuraho Airport =

Airport in Khajuraho, Madhya Pradesh, India

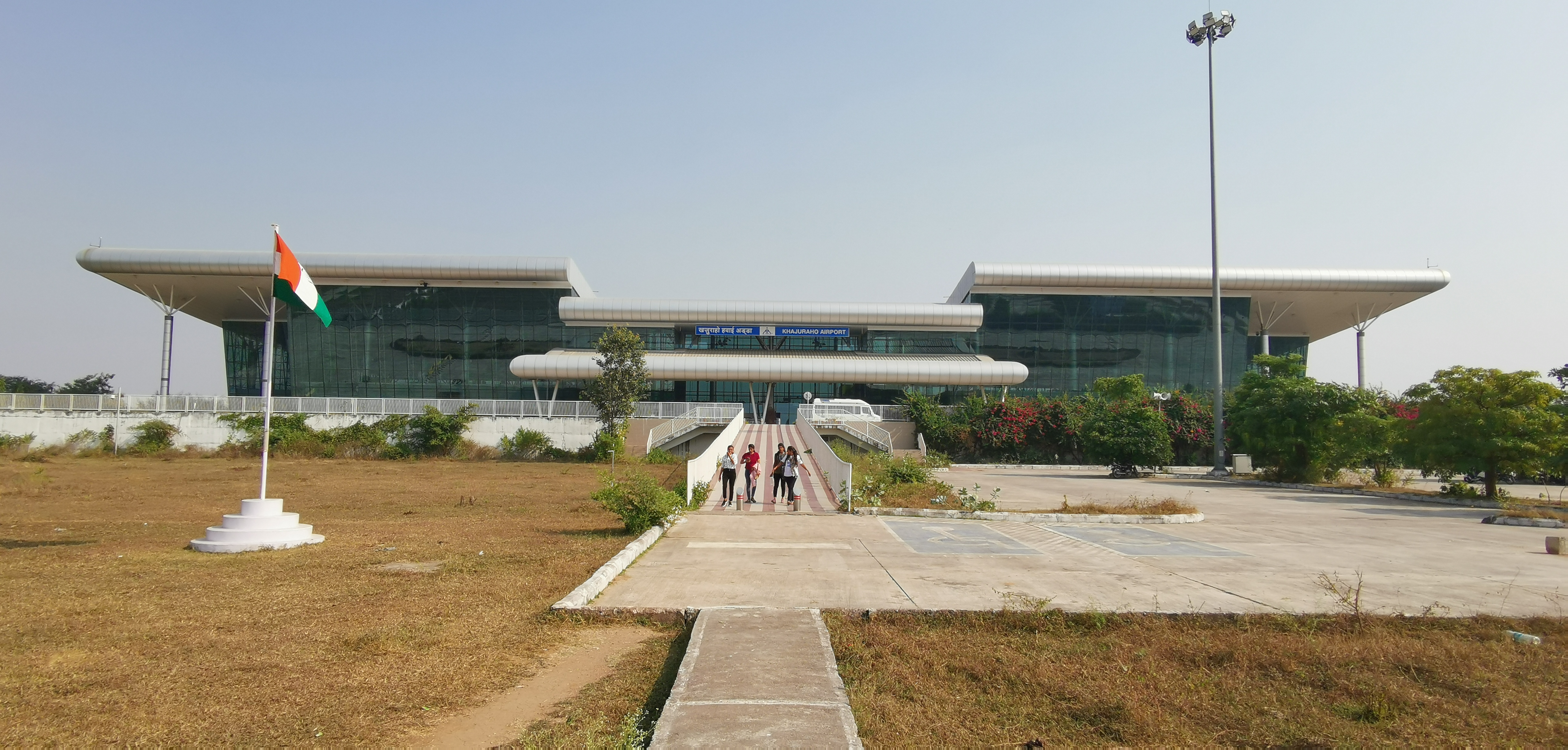
- IATA: HJR; ICAO: VAKJ

Summary
- Airport type: Public
- Operator: Airports Authority of India
- Serves: Khajuraho, Chhatarpur
- Location: Khajuraho, Madhya Pradesh, India
- Opened: 1978; 48 years ago
- Time zone: Indian Standard Time (+5:30)
- Elevation AMSL: 222 m (728 ft)
- Coordinates: 24°49′02″N 079°55′07″E
- Website: Khajuraho Airport

Map
- Location of airport in Madhya Pradesh HJR (India)

Runways
Direction	Length		Surface
Direction	m	ft	Surface
01/19	2,274	7,460	Asphalt

Statistics (April 2025 – March 2026)
- Passengers: 55,253 (▼18.4%)
- Aircraft movements: 1,185 (▼35.5%)
- Cargo tonnage: 0 ( 0%)
- Source: AAI

Khajuraho Airport (IATA: HJR, ICAO: VAKJ) is a domestic airport that serves the cities of Khajuraho and Chhatarpur in Madhya Pradesh, India. The airport is 3 km south of Khajuraho, 4 km from Khajuraho railway station, 40 km from Chhatarpur and 50 km from Panna. It covers an area of 590 acres.

== History ==
The airport opened in 1978, facilitating tourism to the nearby UNESCO world heritage site temple complex.

In August 2013, the central government announced that the Khajuraho Airport would receive a new terminal. Built at a cost of about ₹90 crore (US$9.3 million), the building was inaugurated on 23 January 2016 with officials from the state and union governments in attendance.

== Infrastructure ==
The airport has one asphalt runway, 01/19, with dimensions 2,274 by 45 metres (7,461 ft × 148 ft), one passenger terminal with two aerobridges and an apron capable of parking four ATR-72 type aircraft and three Airbus A320 and Boeing 737 type aircraft.

== Airlines and destinations ==
Airlines	Destinations	Refs.
IndiGo	Delhi, Varanasi	
SpiceJet	Delhi, Varanasi	

== See also ==
- List of airports in Madhya Pradesh
