= Raja Bhoj Airport =

Airport serving Bhopal in Madhya Pradesh, India

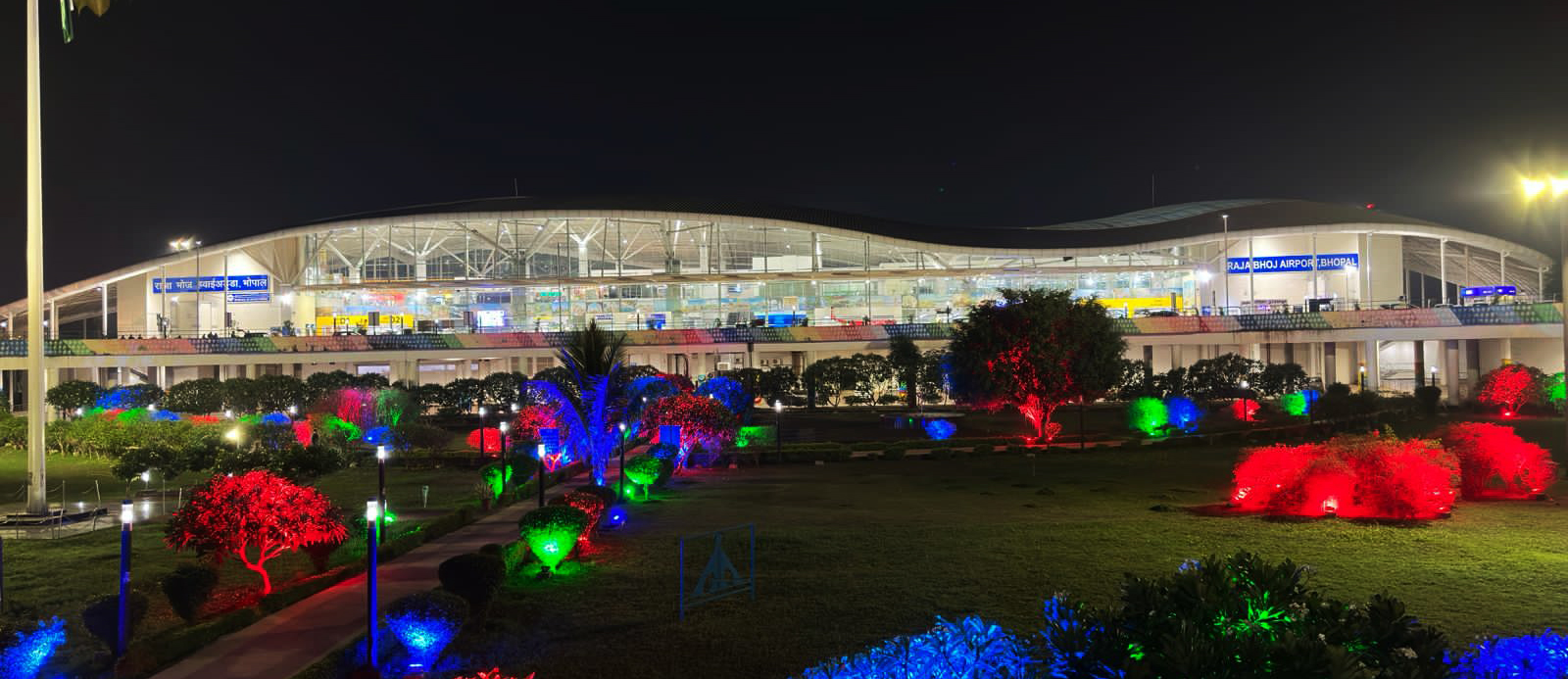
- IATA: BHO; ICAO: VABP

Summary
- Airport type: Public
- Owner: Airports Authority of India
- Operator: Airports Authority of India
- Serves: Bhopal
- Location: Gandhi Nagar, Bhopal, Madhya Pradesh, India
- Elevation AMSL: 1,719 ft (524 m)
- Coordinates: 23°17′15″N 077°20′15″E

Maps
- Location of airport in India BHO (India)
- Interactive map of Raja Bhoj Airport

Runways
Direction	Length		Surface
Direction	ft	m	Surface
12/30	9,022	2,744	Asphalt

Statistics (April 2025 - March 2026)
- Passengers: 15,81,305 (▼1.4%)
- Aircraft movements: 14,567 (▼3.8%)
- Cargo tonnage: 2,510.8 (▲4.2%)
- Source: AAI

Raja Bhoj Airport (IATA: BHO, ICAO: VABP) is a customs airport (Note: Airport with customs checking and clearance facility, and handles predominantly domestic traffic. A very limited number of international flights are allowed to operate from the airport.) serving Bhopal, the capital of the state of Madhya Pradesh, India. It was notified as a customs airport on 13 March 2024. Named after the 10th-century Paramara king, Raja Bhoj, it is the second-busiest airport in Madhya Pradesh in terms of passenger and aircraft movements. It is the third largest airport in the state by area after Gwalior Airport and Indore Airport respectively. It is located in Gandhi Nagar, 15 km (9.3 mi) away from Bhopal Junction railway station in the city centre, and 20 km (12 mi) away from Rani Kamalapati railway station in the south of the city.

Since 1 October 2024, the airport has commenced round the clock (24*7) operations, facilitating increased connectivity and flexibility. The airport has a maintenance, repair and overhaul (MRO) facility due to its advantageous central location in India.

== Development ==
=== Runway ===
The Government of India considered the airport to be expanded to international standards to handle the rising traffic and demands. In 2010, the runway length was increased to 2,744 metres (9,003 ft), making it possible for larger aircraft to land in the airport.

On 25 March 2025, the Bhopal Airport demonstrated its capability of handling Code E Aircraft when an Air India Boeing 777-300ER landed, taxied, and parked at the airport and took off later.

The runway is equipped with a Category II ILS to facilitate smooth landings during lower visibility and poor weather conditions.

The first direct seasonal international flight from the airport was to Jeddah, a Hajj charter flown by the national carrier of Saudi Arabia, Saudia, on 23 October 2010 for Hajj travellers.

=== Renewable energy ===
In 2013, the airport became the first airport in the state to use solar power to run its utility grid system. A 100-kilowatt solar power plant was made operational in June 2013, with plans to install a 2-megawatt solar power plant at the airport in the future. The airport has night landing facilities, an Instrument Landing System (ILS) and CAT VII fire services.

=== Cargo and logistics hub ===
A new air cargo hub with 17 acres of land sanctioned near the airport is planned. The old terminal building is being redeveloped into a cargo complex to increase cargo operations from the capital airport. The temporary air cargo complex was inaugurated in October 2019.

=== Maintenance, repair, and overhaul facility ===
The airport has been selected as one of the eight new destinations to set up maintenance, repair, and overhaul (MRO) facilities in India. The airport's central location in the country provides ample growth and logistics prospects for the facility. Construction began in 2021 and was expected to be completed by 2024.

=== Immigration checkposts and international flights ===
In September 2019, the Directorate General of Civil Aviation (DGCA) started the process of granting international status to the airport. In November 2019, a joint central team composed of members of the Ministry of Home Affairs and Ministry of Civil Aviation visited the airport to review the arrangements in starting immigration facilities, and did not find any major hurdles.

As of 23 December 2023, the airport was classified as an authorized immigration checkpost for entry or exit from India. The airport was notified as a customs airport by the CBIC on 13 March 2024.

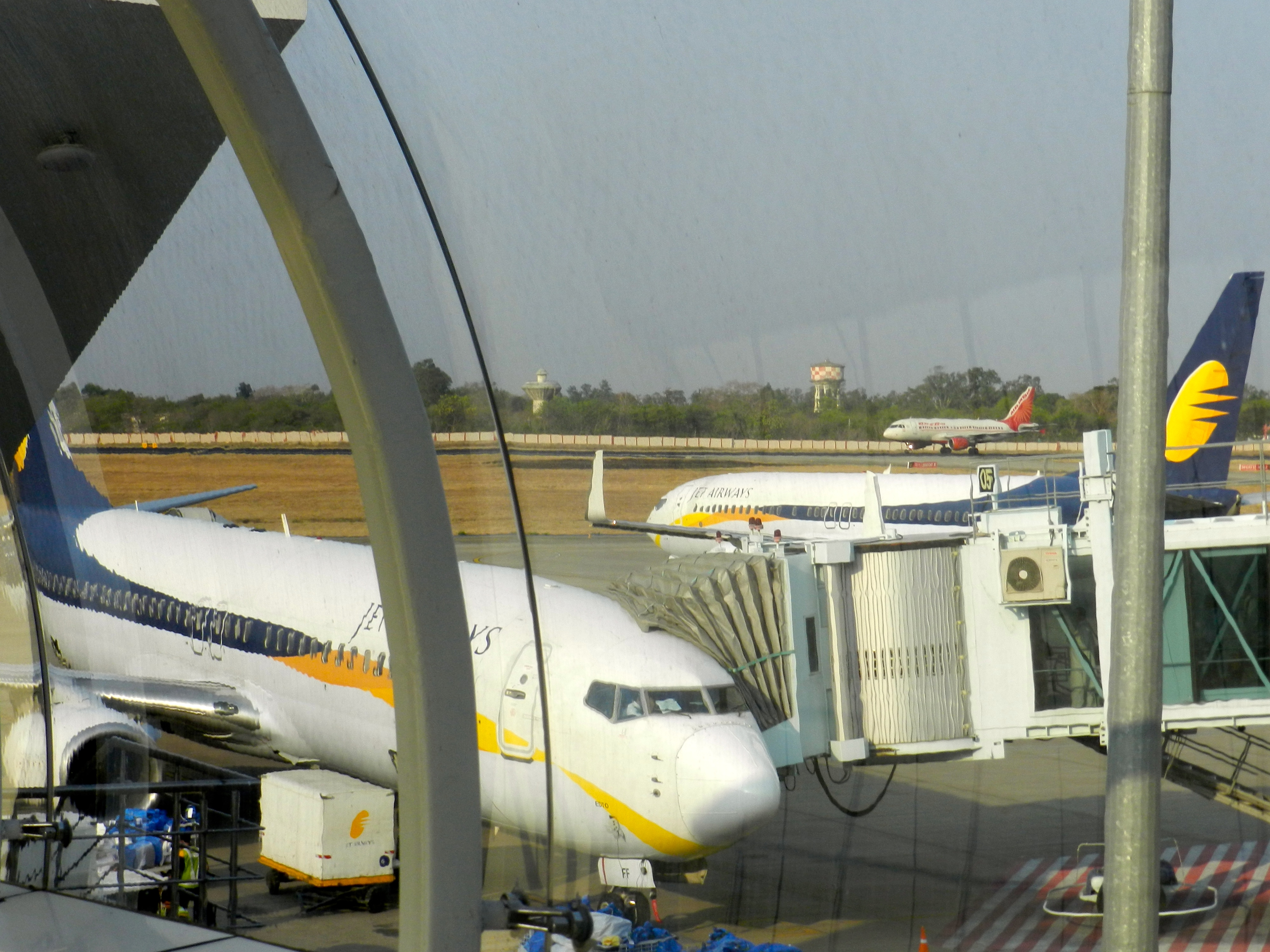
View of the apron from one of the four aerobridges

=== Selfie Point - Say Yes To Life ===
In September 2022, the airport established a selfie point to glorify the importance of difficulties in life. The airport supported the campaign Say Yes To Life run by an eminent psychiatrist based in Bhopal, Dr. Satyakant Trivedi, who is also a member of the suicide prevention task force of the state.

=== Separate floor for arrival and departure ===
Airport officials confirmed that departures will take place on the first floor, and arrivals will be located on the ground floor. This separation is part of an ongoing renovation to reduce traffic congestion, with the new arrival hall on the lower ground floor already nearing completion and expected to be operational before 2026.

== Integrated terminal ==
The integrated terminal building worth ₹135 crore (US$14 million) was inaugurated on 28 June 2011 by the then Minister of Civil Aviation, Vayalar Ravi. The Government of Madhya Pradesh had given 400 acres of land for the construction of the international terminal. The terminal building is spread over 26,936 square metres (289,940 sq ft) and has 14 check-in counters, four immigration counters for departures, and six immigration counters for arrivals.

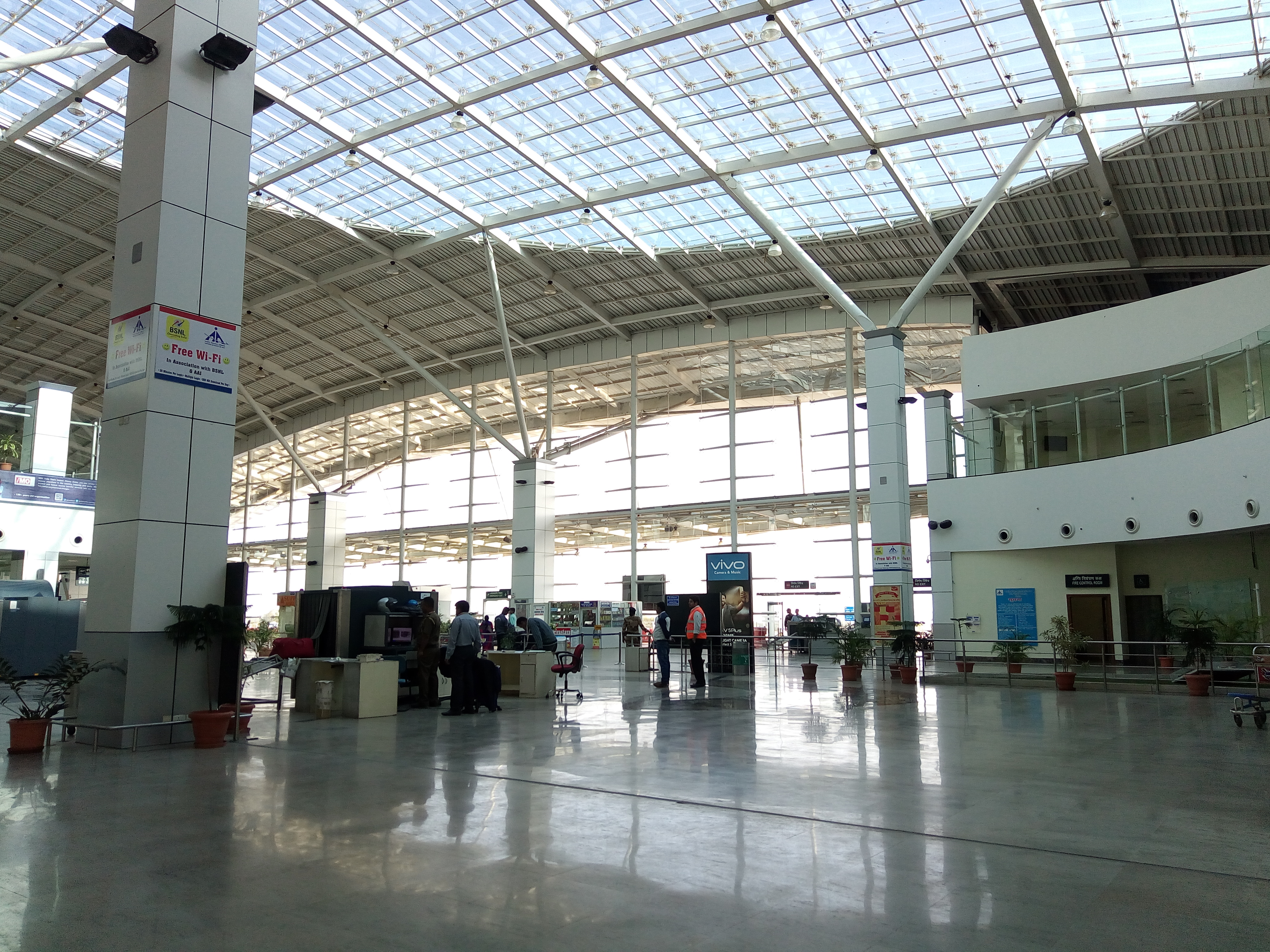
Interior of the airport's terminal

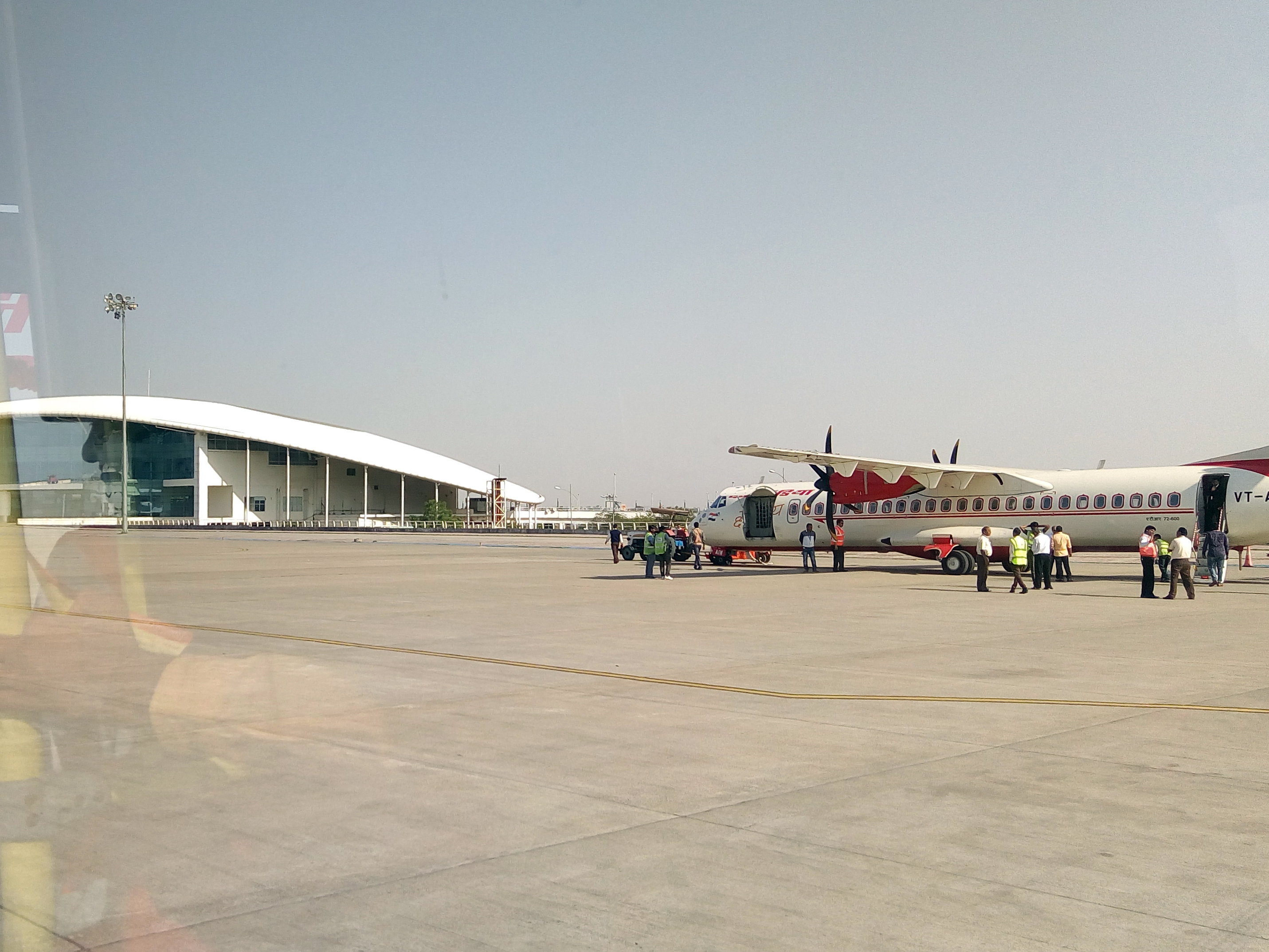
View of the terminal from the apron

It also has 22 customs counters, 11 for arrival and 11 for departure, and six X-ray machines for security. The terminal now also has a restaurant and a few retail stores that were developed as part of the Airports Authority of India's (AAI) scheme of the master concessionaire. The terminal is connected to four aerobridges. A new air traffic control (ATC) tower was inaugurated by the airport authorities on 1 March 2024, built at a cost of ₹40 crore (US$4.2 million). It is now the tallest ATC tower in the state, at a height of 32 m (105 ft). At the initial stage, it will operate for only 2–3 hours, as testing will be underway. It will replace the existing ATC tower by shifting all operations to the new tower by April 2024.

== Airlines and destinations ==
Airlines	Destinations
Air India	Delhi, Mumbai
Air India Express	Delhi, Mumbai, Navi Mumbai, Sharjah
Alliance Air	Rewa, Patna
IndiGo	Ahmedabad, Bengaluru, Delhi, Hyderabad, Mumbai, Navi Mumbai, Noida, Pune, Raipur
SpiceJet	Seasonal: Jeddah

== Awards and recognition ==
- The Raja Bhoj Airport has secured the topmost position in AAI's customer satisfaction survey thrice consecutively; in 2023, in 2024 and in 2025

== Accidents and incidents ==
- On 27 March 2021, a trainer aircraft crashed on the outskirts of the airport. Shortly after takeoff from Guna, the pilot in-command faced some problems in the aircraft and contacted the Bhopal ATC for an emergency landing. The flight could not reach the runway and crashed in an open field 8 km (5.0 mi) away from the airport. Only three crew members were in the aircraft, all of whom were injured.

== Future expansions ==
Airport Authority of India (AAI) has finalized Raja Bhoj Airport masterplan which shall be implemented in three phases. The final phase is likely to be completed by 2047. The first phase will focus on enhancing existing infrastructure, including terminal expansion and upgraded air traffic control systems. The second phase involves significant changes like new taxiways and further terminal expansion. The final phase, to be completed by 2047, includes extending the runway to 4000 meters, allowing for larger aircraft and new routes. The expansion is expected to boost tourism, trade, and regional connectivity while ensuring sustainable development.

== See also ==
- Bhopal State
- Devi Ahilya Bai Holkar Airport
- Jabalpur Airport
- Gwalior Airport
- Tourism in Madhya Pradesh
- List of airports in Madhya Pradesh
- List of airports in India
- List of the busiest airports in India
