= Jaisalmer Airport =

Airport of Rajasthan, India

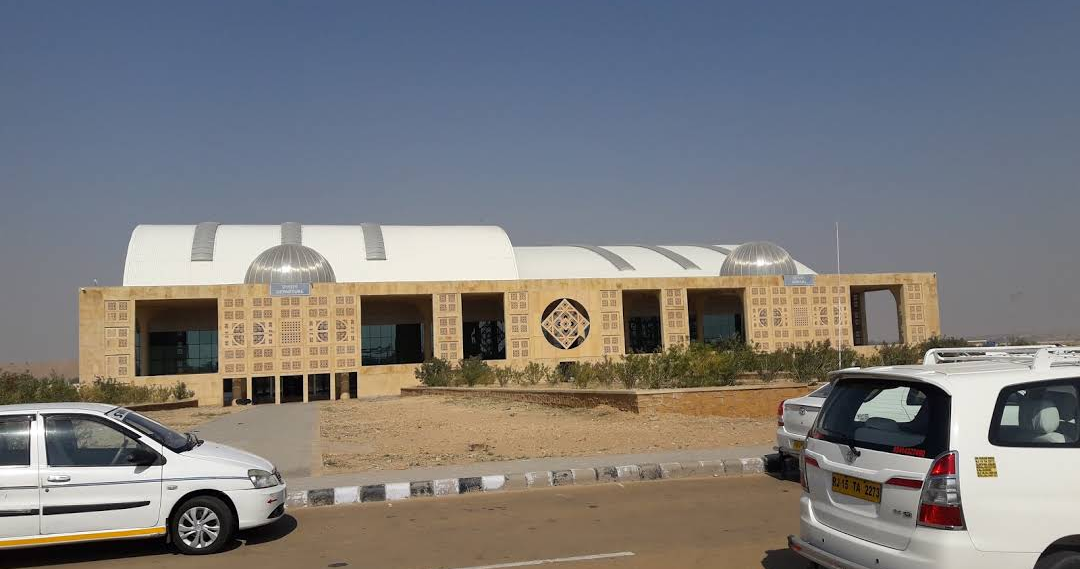
- IATA: JSA; ICAO: VIJR

Summary
- Airport type: Military/Public
- Owner: Airports Authority of India
- Operator: Airports Authority of India
- Serves: Jaisalmer
- Location: Jaisalmer, Rajasthan, India
- Elevation AMSL: 251 m (823 ft)
- Coordinates: 26°52′49″N 70°51′18″E

Map
- Location of airport in Rajasthan JSA (India)

Runways
Direction	Length		Surface
Direction	m	ft	Surface
04/22	2,743	9,000	Concrete

Statistics (April 2025 - March 2026)
- Passengers: 2,43,060 (▲101.4%)
- Aircraft movements: 2,104 (▲106.7%)
- Cargo tonnage: 0 ( 0%)
- Source: AAI

Jaisalmer Airport (IATA: JSA, ICAO: VIJR) is a domestic airport serving Jaisalmer, Rajasthan, India. It is located 12.6 kilometres (7.8 mi) from the city centre. The airport operates as a civil enclave on an Indian Air Force base.

The airport has a single runway of 9,000 feet (2,700 m) in length and 150 feet (46 m) in width. Carriers that have previously flown to/from the airport include Vayudoot and Kingfisher Airlines. In 2015, it was not used for civil flights, and was closed until services resumed under the UDAN scheme in 2017.

== New civil terminal ==
The Airports Authority of India has constructed a new passenger terminal at the southern end of the airfield. Construction of the ₹ 80 crore terminal was completed in March 2013. The civil enclave is spread over 65 acres, and consists of the terminal and an apron for parking three Airbus A321 aircraft.

== Airlines and destinations ==
Airlines	Destinations
Air India	Delhi
Alliance Air	Seasonal: Delhi
IndiGo	Ahmedabad, Delhi, Jaipur, Mumbai; Seasonal: Bengaluru
SpiceJet	Delhi

== Gallery ==
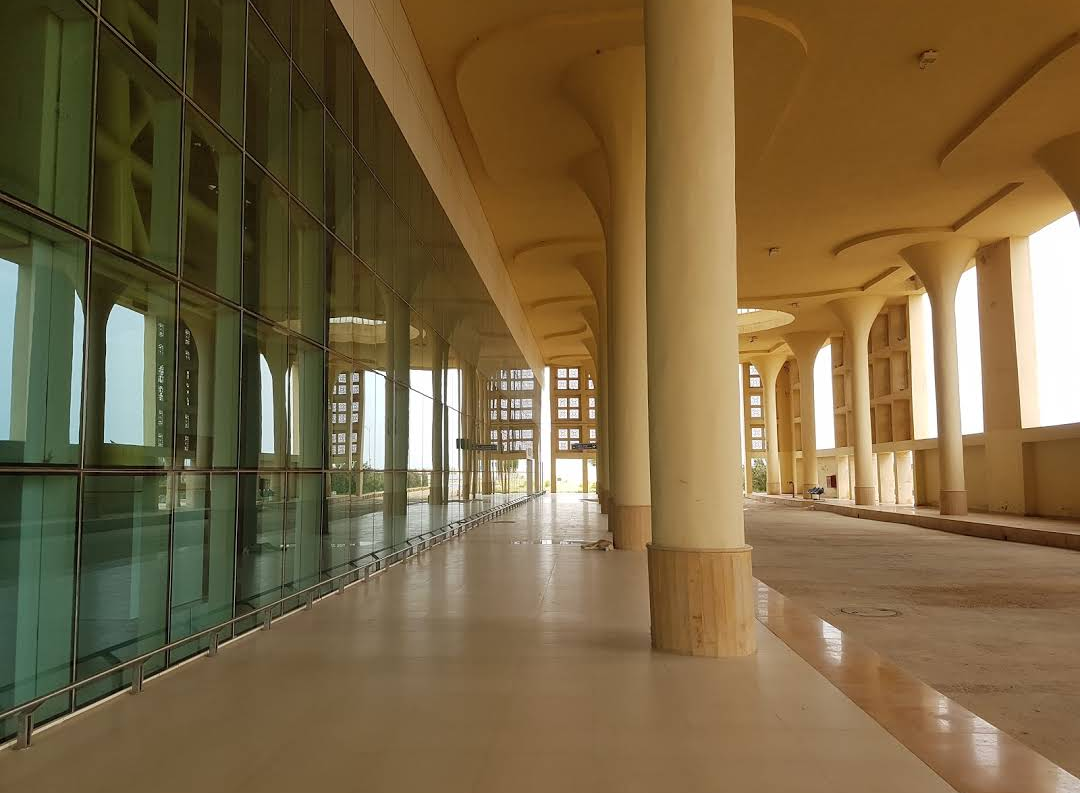
Terminal entrance

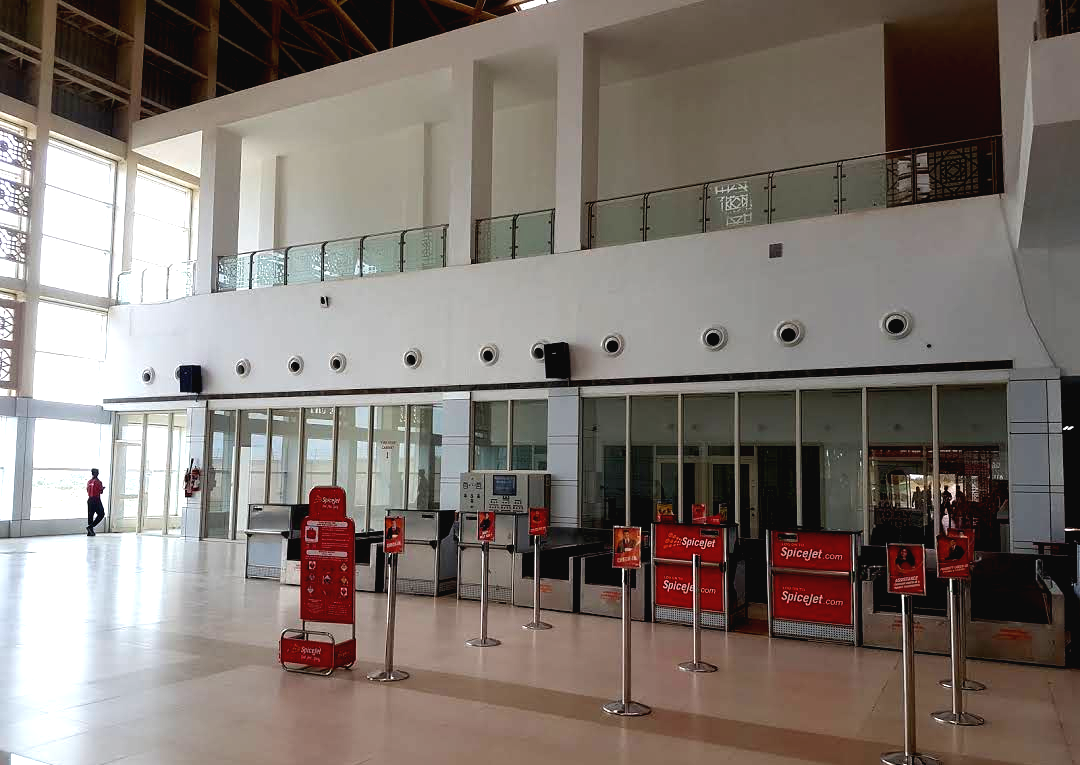
Check-in counters

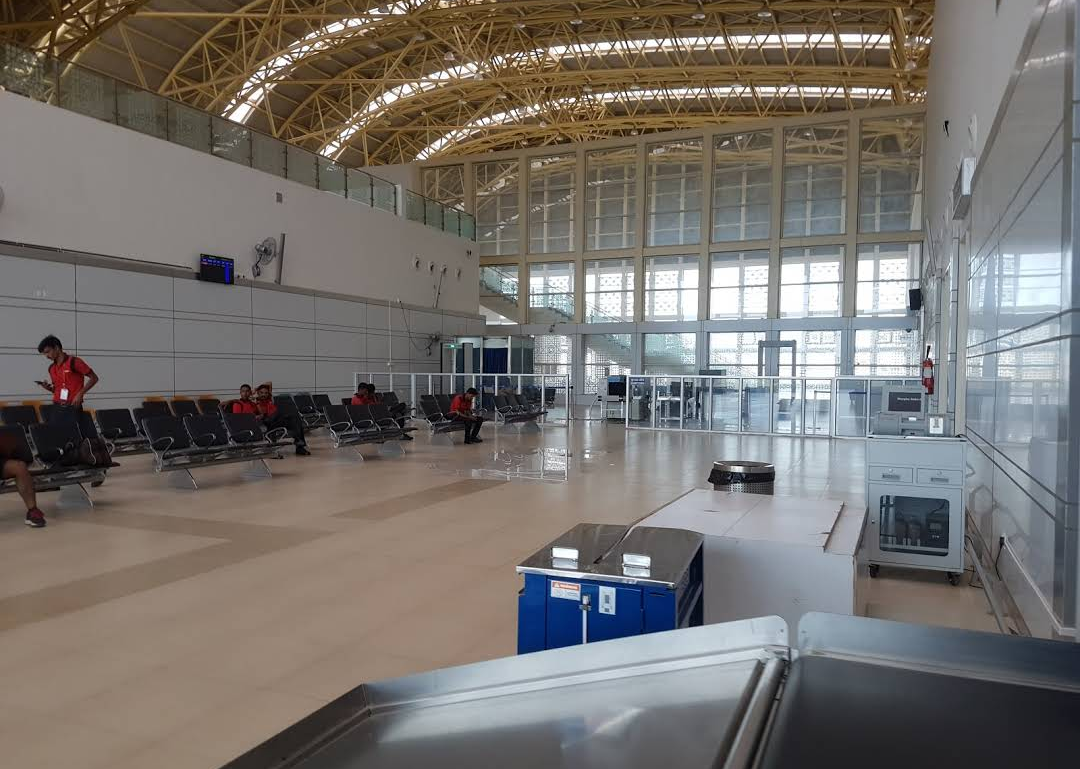
Waiting hall area

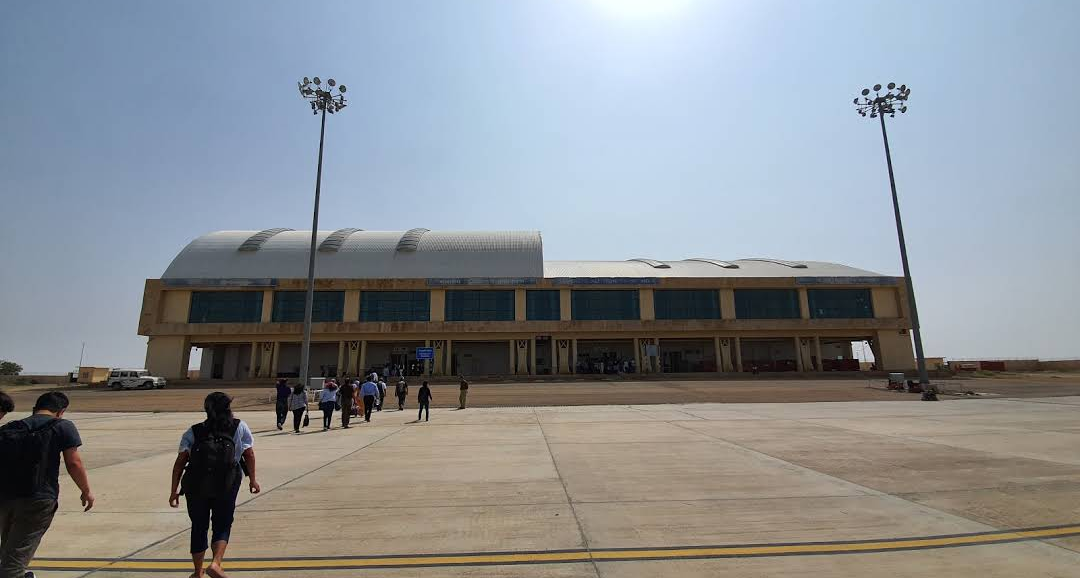
Terminal building view from Apron
