= Zero Airport =

Airport of Arunachal Pradesh, India

Ziro Airport
- IATA: ZER; ICAO: VEZO

Summary
- Airport type: Military/Public
- Operator: Airports Authority of India
- Serves: Ziro
- Location: Ziro, Arunachal Pradesh, India
- Elevation AMSL: 1,590 m (5,220 ft)
- Coordinates: 27°35′18″N 093°49′41″E
- Website: Zero Airport

Map
- Location within Arunachal Pradesh Location within India

Runways
| Direction | Length | | Surface |
| Direction | m | ft | Surface |
|---|---|---|---|
| 18/36 | 1,195 | 3,920 | Asphalt |

Statistics (April 2025 – March 2026)
- Passengers: 640 (▲36.8%)
- Aircraft movements: 138 (▲24.3%)
- Cargo tonnage: —
- Source: AAI

Zero Airport or Ziro Airport (IATA: ZER, ICAO: VEZO) is a domestic airport and an Advanced Landing Ground (ALG) of the Indian Air Force, serving the city of Ziro, Arunachal Pradesh, India. In the past, Vayudoot and Air India operated daily flights to the airport. As of now, Alliance Air operates flights to and from the airport.

== History ==
The airport was originally built as an Advanced Landing Ground (ALG) for the Indian Air Force for military operations, exercises and emergency operations, which later, was also used alongside the Air Force by private and government aircraft. To improve connectivity, tourism and development in the Ziro Valley, a pre-feasibility study was conducted by the Ministry of Civil Aviation for improving the airport to enable ATR-42 class aircraft in 2008. The study found it unfeasible to extend the 1,220 metre runway to accommodate a 50-seater aircraft, due to unauthorized constructions along the boundary wall. It was proposed that a new runway measuring 2010 metres be built on land adjacent to the current runway and all airport structures, like the Air Traffic Control (ATC) tower, the fire station and the terminal building be relocated. Commercial flight services were provided by Vayudoot, Air India and sometimes by the Indian Air Force, but that did not last for long and were indefinitely stopped. In October 2022, Alliance Air resumed passenger services from the airport to Dibrugarh and North Lakhimpur, both in Assam.

== Airlines and destinations ==
| Airlines | Destinations |
|---|---|
| Alliance Air | Guwahati |
