= Devi Ahilya Bai Holkar Airport =

Airport serving Indore, Madhya Pradesh, India

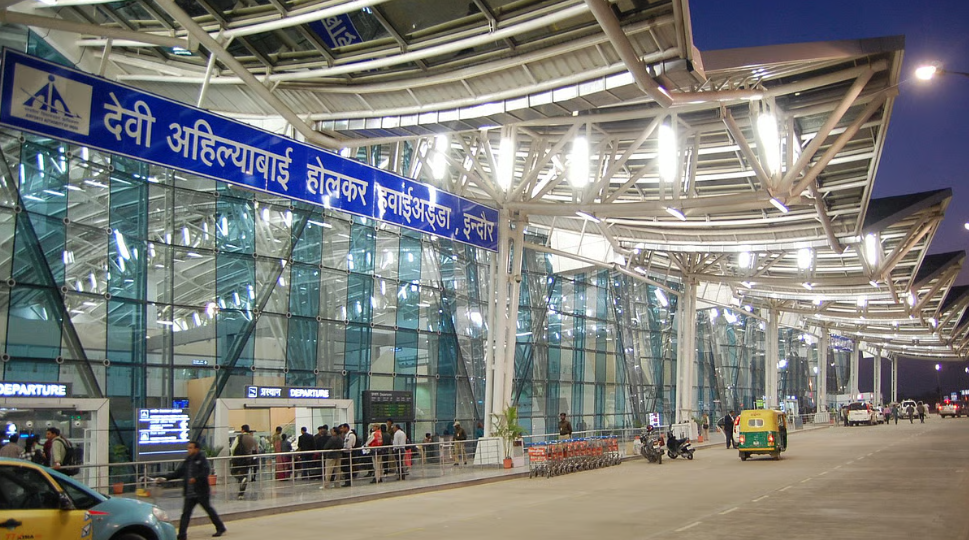
- IATA: IDR; ICAO: VAID

Summary
- Airport type: Public
- Owner: Airports Authority of India
- Operator: Airports Authority of India
- Serves: Indore Metropolitan Region
- Location: Bijasan, Indore, Madhya Pradesh, India
- Opened: 1948; 78 years ago 29 May 2019 (upgraded to international)
- Hub for: IndiGo
- Focus city for: Air India Express
- Elevation AMSL: 1,850 ft (560 m)
- Coordinates: 22°43′18″N 75°48′03″E
- Website: Indore Airport

Maps
- Location within Madhya Pradesh Location within India
- Interactive map of Devi Ahilya Bai Holkar Airport

Runways
Direction	Length		Surface
Direction	ft	m	Surface
07/25	9,035	2,754	Composite

Statistics (April 2025 - March 2026)
- Passengers: 42,44,999 (▲12.9%)
- Aircraft movements: 34,906 (▲3%)
- Cargo tonnage: 17,148 (▲23.4%)
- Source: AAI

Devi Ahilya Bai Holkar Airport (IATA: IDR, ICAO: VAID) is a customs airport (Note: Airport with customs checking and clearance facility, and handles predominantly domestic traffic. Limited number of international flights are allowed to operate from the airport.) serving the city of Indore, the financial capital of the state of Madhya Pradesh. It is the busiest airport in Central India and is located at Bijasen Tekri, 8 km (5.0 mi) west of Indore. The airport is named after the second ruler of the Holkar dynasty, Rajmata Ahilyabai Holkar. It is a single runway airport with night landing facilities, enabling day and night operations from the airport since 2018.

The airport handled around 4.2 million passengers in the year 2025-26, making it the 19st-busiest airport in India by passenger traffic in the year 2025-26 according to the statistics released by the Airports Authority of India (AAI). It caters to around 21 domestic and 1 international destinations. It is also the primary cargo hub for Madhya Pradesh exceeding the combined cargo tonnage of the next 4 busiest airports of the state, making it the 15th busiest cargo airport in India in 2024-25.

== History ==
On the recommendations of Nevill Vintcent of Messrs Tata and Sons (Aviation Department), the Indore State administration, under the rule of Maharaja Yashwant Rao Holkar II, selected the site adjacent to Bijasen for the construction of the airport in 1935. First air services from Indore to Gwalior, Delhi and Mumbai began in July 1948. The airport was later handed over to the Government of India in April 1950 under the Central Financial Integration Scheme. A new runway measuring 5,600 feet in length was completed by March 1966 at a cost of ₹15 lakh to accommodate larger aircraft of the time.

On 14 February 2012, authorities inaugurated a new and modern terminal building enabling both domestic and international connectivity. In 2018, the airport was designated as an international airport establishing it as a prominent aviation hub in central India.

The city's strategic location gives the airport a central location, acting as a conduit for flights to and from the country's western, southern and northern regions. Additionally, the commercial value of the city and its proximity to industrial areas such as Pithampur SEZ and Sanwer Industrial Area offers the airport with various routes to different commercial markets in India. The airport also provides tourism connectivity on the religious corridor of India by serving as the primary airport for Ujjain Mahakaleshwar and Omkareshwar.

== Airport Structure ==
The total land area of DABH airport measures 729 acres (295 ha). The airport has two terminals, T1 for smaller aircraft like ATR and T2 for larger jets. The current terminal building (T2) is spread over 18,000 m^{2} (190,000 sq ft). The Madhya Pradesh Flying Club (MPFC) is at the south end of the runway. Its apron has space for four-C172 aircraft simultaneously.

=== Apron ===
The main apron is connected to both the terminals. It has space for one B737, four B737/A321, four ATR72 and one Q400 aircraft simultaneously. An additional apron with 15 parking bays along with a parallel taxiway was created under the airport expansion plan in Mar 2021. This has increased the current aircraft parking capacity to 26 at the airport.

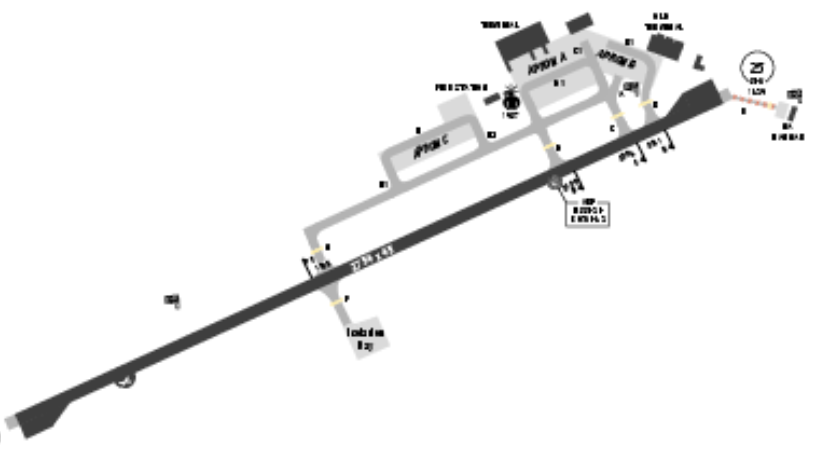
VAID airport map

=== Airfield and Runway ===
The airfield is equipped with night landing facilities including a CAT-I Instrument Landing System (ILS) (on Runway 25 only) as well as navigational facilities like DVOR/DME and an NDB. The sole runway 07/25 is 2,754 m long and 45 m wide. A runway extension is planned to accommodate larger Code-E aircraft as a part of the expansion plan for the airport. The airport currently caters to the movement of 96 flights every day. In 2018, the Ministry of Civil Aviation had given its approval for operating international flights from the airport making it the first international airport in Madhya Pradesh.

A new tower-cum-technical block of the air traffic controller (ATC) has been inaugurated in December 2024. The fire extinguisher building has also been shifted along with the ATC to the other side of the runway. This would make space for the airside expansion of the apron for the new terminal. In addition, a zero-waste plant has also been installed at the airport as part of the ongoing commitment to sustainability.

== Terminals ==
=== Terminal - 1 (T1) ===
The older airport terminal was abandoned once the newer terminal was built. But to accommodate the increasing capacity of travellers at DABH airport, Terminal-1 has been replanned and renovated. T1 would serve as the arrival and departure terminal for smaller ATR aircraft as well as the international flights from the airport. Around 16 flights would be shifted from T2 to T1 handling 2700 passengers daily. This would add an additional 15 Lakh (1.5 Million) passenger capacity to the airport. The terminal is equipped with 14 check-in counters and 3 X-ray machines with a seating capacity of 400 people. It has 3 gates on the ground floor (airside) along with 2 baggage carousel (one domestic and one international). The renovated terminal will begin to function from April 2026.

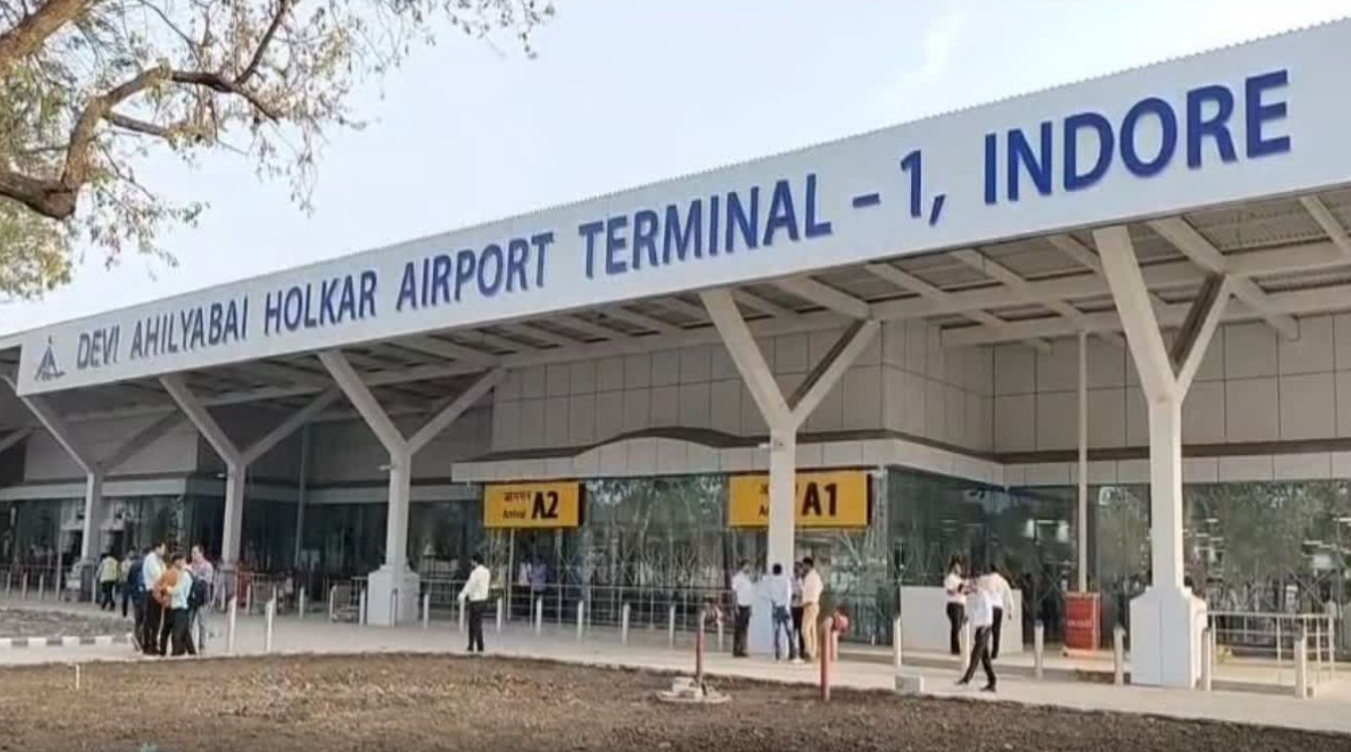
Newly renovated T1

=== Terminal - 2 (T2) ===
The new integrated terminal building (NITB) was inaugurated in 2012. It was built by AAI at a cost of ₹135 crore (US$14 million) and is capable of handling 700 passengers per hour. The current T2 has an annual capacity of 40 Lakh (4 Million) travellers. It has 16 check-in counters, 16 immigration counters (four for departure and 12 for arrivals) and four counters for customs, along with modern escalators, lifts, self check-in kiosks, mobile charging stations and a high-tech baggage handling system with 3 baggage carousels. Additionally, 569 CCTVs and X-ray machines are available for security. As per the international standards, it also has two ATMs (01 SBI and 01 Union Bank of India), shopping stalls, food court and lounge facility. There are 11 gates (8 on first floor and 3 on the ground floor) and 5 aerobridges at the terminal.

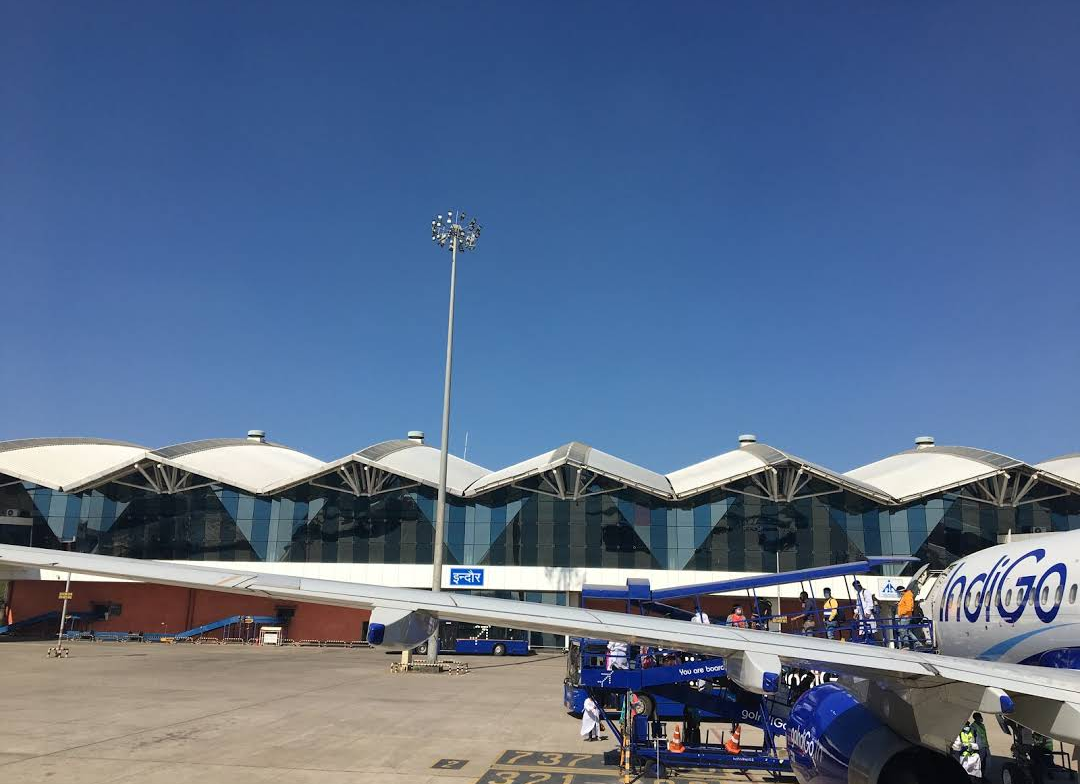
Airside T2

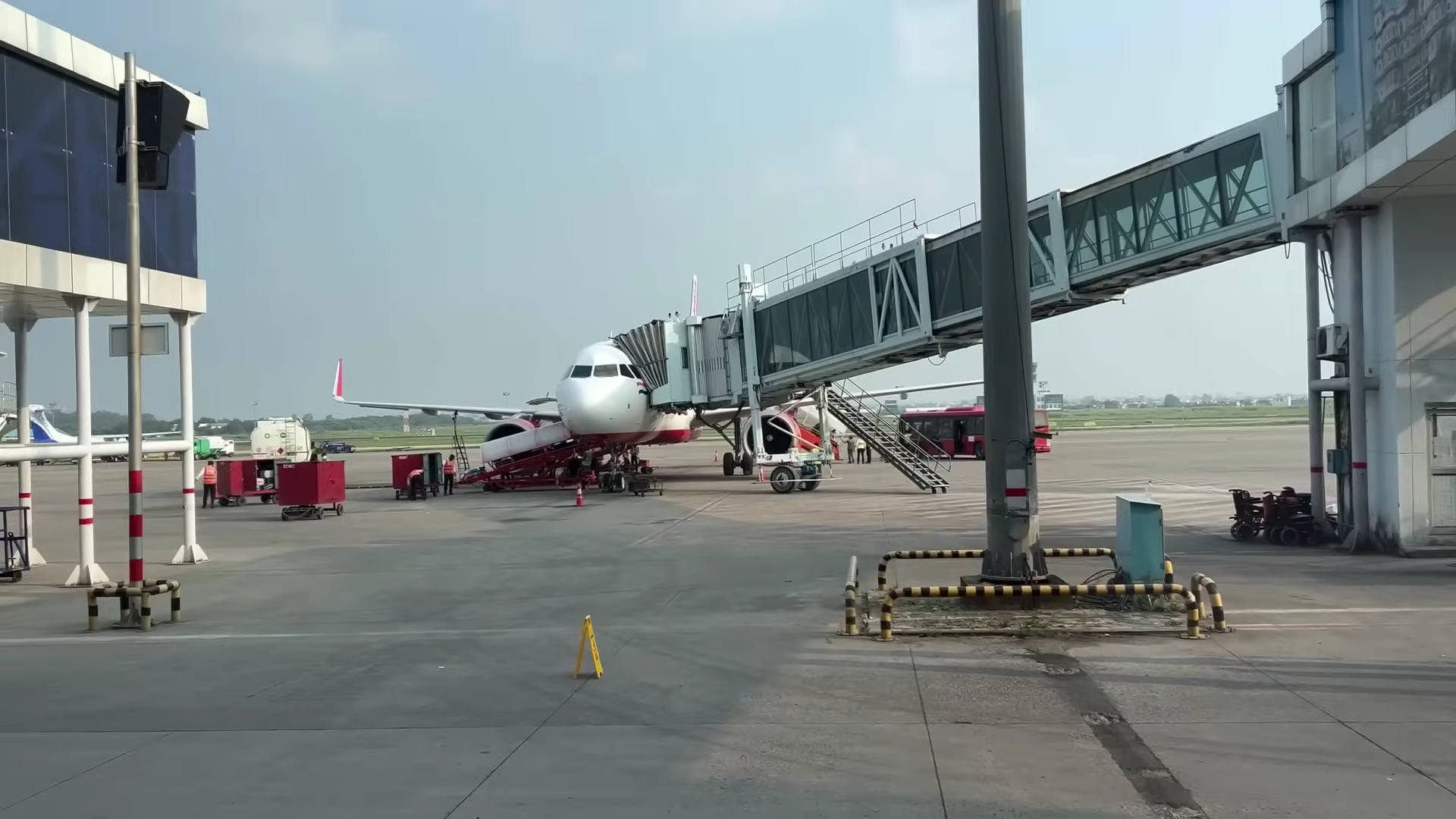
Aerobridge connecting aircraft to T2

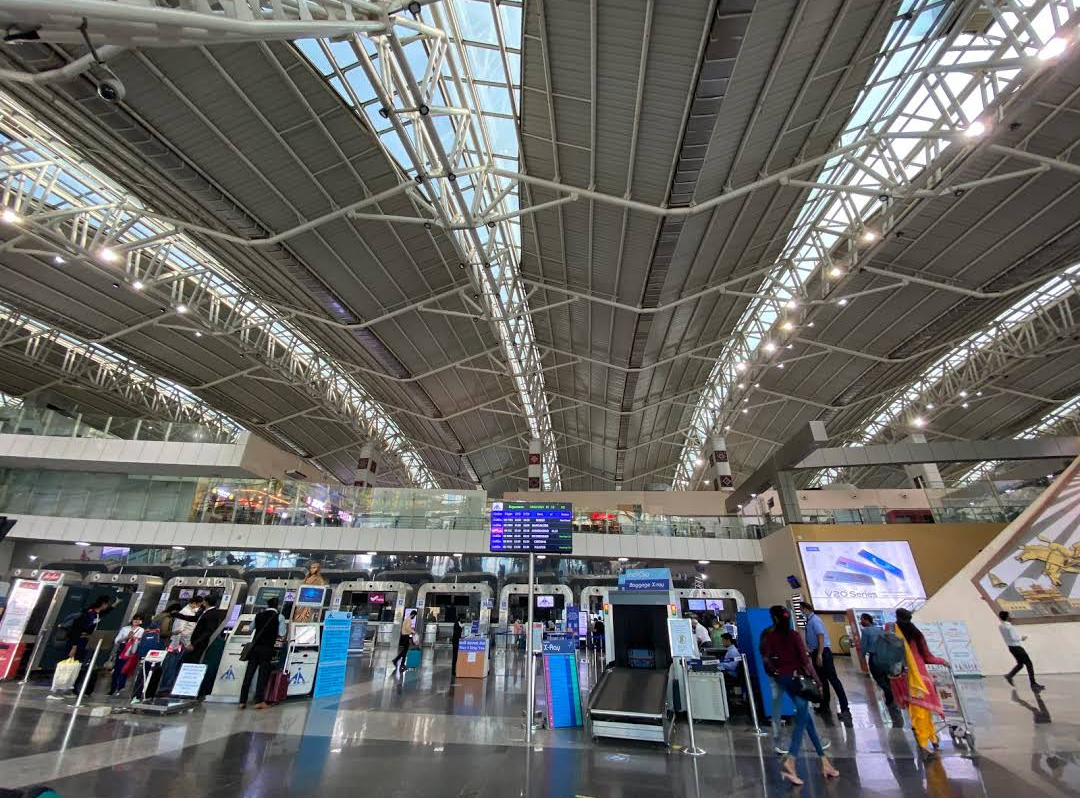
Inside Terminal-2

=== Cargo Terminal ===
A domestic air cargo terminal (area: 1700 sq m) and center for perishable cargo (area: 300 sq m) was inaugurated in June 2023. The terminal has been built at a cost of ₹13 Crore. It has a capacity to handle 73,000 MT of cargo annually. The airport is projected to handle 25,000 MT of cargo by the year 2029-2030. Currently, Indigo, Air India, and Vistara airlines carry out cargo movements from the airport.

As of October 2025, plans are in motion to introduce dedicated cargo flights from the airport in partnership with local traders and industry bodies and expanding the air cargo operations.

== Airlines and destinations ==
Airlines	Destinations
Air India	Delhi, Mumbai
Air India Express	Abu Dhabi, Bangkok–Suvarnabhumi, Bengaluru, Delhi, Hyderabad, Navi Mumbai, Pune, Sharjah
Alliance Air	Delhi, Jalgaon
IndiGo	Ahmedabad, Bengaluru, Chandigarh, Chennai, Delhi, Goa–Dabolim, Hyderabad, Jabalpur, Jaipur, Kolkata, Lucknow, Mumbai, Navi Mumbai, Nagpur, Pune, Raipur, Rewa
Star Air	Hyderabad, Mumbai, Gondia

== Statistics ==
Annual passenger and cargo traffic at DABH airport
Financial year	Passenger traffic	Aircraft movement	Cargo tonnage
2024-25	3,759,411	32,976	10,148
2023-24	3,464,831	31,987	10,189
2022-23	2,828,587	25,184	10,634
2021-22	1,629,668	16,498	8,797
2020-21	896,304	09,966	8,054
2019-20	2,918,971	22,935	10,770
2018-19	3,158,368	26,442	11,729
2017-18	2,269,971	18,692	10,851
2016-17	1,784,073	14,396	7,668
2015-16	1,692,892	14,858	6,992

== Ground Transportation ==
=== Road ===
On arrival at the terminal-2, the airport offers prepaid taxi services, auto rickshaws, e-rickshaws and private cabs to travel to Indore or nearby cities. The airport is well connected to Indore city by high frequency city bus service (AiCTSL). Several bus routes offer direct connectivity to various destinations in the city:

Bus Service	Frequency	Destinations
Route 03-C	30 min.	Indore junction, Rajwada, Bada Ganpati
Route 07	20 min.	Gandhi Nagar, Bada Ganpati, Rajmohalla, Mhow Naka
Route 11	20-30 min.	Tejaji Nagar, Navlakha, Indore Junction, Rajmohalla, Bada Ganpati

=== Metro ===
The Indore metro yellow line connects the airport to Indore city. An underground metro station is under construction at 200m from the airport building. The metro station would be connected by underground subways and travelators to terminal-2. The immediate stations next to the airport station on the yellow line are Gandhi Nagar and BSF/ Kalani Nagar.

=== Rail ===
Indore junction (INDB), the main railway station serving Indore city lies at a distance of 8 km from the airport, whereas the secondary railway station, Laxmibai Nagar (LMNR) is 9 km away.

== Expansion Plan ==
=== Expansion on the Current Airport ===
A Multi Level Car Parking (MLCP) is planned at the airport in front of Terminal-2, to give way for the new terminal (T3). In addition to that, an underground metro station of the Indore Metro yellow line is being constructed besides T2. An intercity Vande Metro is also planned between Ujjain and Indore terminating at the DABH airport, in view with the Simhastha 2028.

==== Terminal - 3 (T3) ====
Currently the two terminals combined provide a capacity of 55 Lakh (5.5 Million) passenger annually. This capacity is expected to exceed in the coming years due to the rapid growth of the city. A phase wise expansion plan has been devised for the airport. Under this, a new larger terminal adjoining terminal-2, along with an airport hotel and a convention center, have been planned at the airport site. The central aviation authority has granted the approval for the third terminal, which would be built after shifting the current parking space.

=== New Airport ===
In view of the future and the growing traffic, due to which the airport may not be able to cope up with it, at least after the present decade, a new airport has been proposed, which is planned to become India's largest greenfield airport near Chapda town, about 40 km (25 mi) from Indore. The plan has been approved by the Ministry of Civil Aviation.

An alternate plan to redevelop the Ujjain airstrip has also been put forward in view of the 2028 Simhastha. The two airports (Indore and Ujjain) would match the required capacity of the newer proposed airport at Chapda.

== Awards ==
DABH airport was adjudged as the Best Airport in under 20 lakh (2 million) annual passenger footfall category in Asia-Pacific region in the Airports Council International (ACI)'s Airport Service Quality (ASQ) survey's rankings for the year 2017. The World Book of Records, UK, bestowed the Worlds Standardisation Certification to the airport for the achievement of ACI Award 2017 on 9 April 2018.

== See also ==
- Raja Bhoj Airport
- Gwalior Airport
- Jabalpur Airport
- Indore State
- House of Holkar
- List of airports in India
- List of the busiest airports in India
