= List of Kingfisher Airlines destinations =

Kingfisher Airlines flew to 25 destinations as of 30 September 2012, the day it operated its last flights.

| Hub |
| Terminated before 30 September 2012 |

| City | Country | IATA | ICAO | Airport | Ref |
|---|---|---|---|---|---|
| Dhaka | Bangladesh | DAC | VGHS | Hazrat Shahjalal International Airport | |
| Hong Kong | Hong Kong | HKG | VHHH | Hong Kong International Airport | |
| Agartala | India | IXA | VEAT | Agartala Airport | |
| Agatti | India | AGX | VOAT | Agatti Aerodrome | (Note: Appears in route map dated 30 June 2011; does not appear in final schedule (summer 2012)) |
| Agra | India | AGR | VIAG | Agra Airport | |
| Ahmedabad | India | AMD | VAAH | Sardar Vallabhbhai Patel International Airport | |
| Aizawl | India | AJL | VELP | Lengpui Airport | |
| Amritsar | India | ATQ | VIAR | Sri Guru Ram Dass Jee International Airport | |
| Aurangabad | India | IXU | VAAU | Aurangabad Airport | |
| Bagdogra | India | IXB | VEBD | Bagdogra Airport | |
| Bangalore | India | BLR | VOBL | Kempegowda International Airport | |
| Belgaum | India | IXG | VOBM | Belgaum Airport | |
| Bhavnagar | India | BHU | VABV | Bhavnagar Airport | |
| Bhubaneswar | India | BBI | VEBS | Biju Patnaik Airport | |
| Bhuj | India | BHJ | VABJ | Bhuj Airport | |
| Chandigarh | India | IXC | VICG | Chandigarh International Airport | |
| Chennai | India | MAA | VOMM | Chennai International Airport | |
| Coimbatore | India | CJB | VOCB | Coimbatore International Airport | |
| Dehradun | India | DED | VIDN | Jolly Grant Airport | |
| Delhi | India | DEL | VIDP | Indira Gandhi International Airport | |
| Dharamshala | India | DHM | VIGG | Gaggal Airport | |
| Goa | India | GOI | VOGO | Dabolim Airport | |
| Guwahati | India | GAU | VEGT | Lokpriya Gopinath Bordoloi International Airport | |
| Hubli | India | HBX | VAHB | Hubli Airport | |
| Hyderabad | India | HYD | VOHS | Rajiv Gandhi International Airport | |
| Imphal | India | IMF | VEIM | Imphal International Airport | |
| Indore | India | IDR | VAID | Devi Ahilyabai Holkar Airport | |
| Jabalpur | India | JLR | VAJB | Jabalpur Airport | |
| Jaipur | India | JAI | VIJP | Jaipur International Airport | |
| Jaisalmer | India | JSA | VIJR | Jaisalmer Airport | (Note: Launched in December 2007; does not appear in final schedule (summer 2012)) |
| Jammu | India | IXJ | VIJU | Jammu Airport | |
| Jamshedpur | India | IXW | VEJS | Sonari Airport | |
| Jodhpur | India | JDH | VIJO | Jodhpur Airport | |
| Kandla | India | IXY | VAKE | Kandla Airport | |
| Khajuraho | India | HJR | VEKO | Civil Aerodrome Khajuraho | (Note: Appears in Airline Route post dated 7 September 2010; does not appear in final schedule (summer 2012)) |
| Kochi | India | COK | VOCI | Cochin International Airport | |
| Kolhapur | India | KLH | VAKP | Kolhapur Airport | |
| Kolkata | India | CCU | VECC | Netaji Subhas Chandra Bose International Airport | |
| Kozhikode | India | CCJ | VOCL | Calicut International Airport | |
| Kullu | India | KUU | VIBR | Bhuntar Airport | |
| Latur | India | LTU | VALT | Latur Airport | |
| Leh | India | IXL | VILH | Kushok Bakula Rimpochee Airport | |
| Lucknow | India | LKO | VILK | Chaudhary Charan Singh International Airport | |
| Ludhiana | India | LUH | VILD | Sahnewal Airport | (Note: Began in August 2010; does not appear in final schedule (summer 2012)) |
| Madurai | India | IXM | VOMD | Madurai Airport | |
| Mangalore | India | IXE | VOML | Mangalore Airport | |
| Mumbai | India | BOM | VABB | Chhatrapati Shivaji Maharaj International Airport | |
| Mysore | India | MYQ | VOMY | Mysore Airport | |
| Nagpur | India | NAG | VANP | Dr. Babasaheb Ambedkar International Airport | |
| Nanded | India | NDC | VAND | Shri Guru Gobind Singh Ji Airport | |
| Nashik | India | ISK | VAOZ | Ozar Airport | |
| Pantnagar | India | PGH | VIPT | Pantnagar Airport | |
| Patna | India | PAT | VEPT | Lok Nayak Jayaprakash Airport | |
| Port Blair | India | IXZ | VOPB | Veer Savarkar International Airport | |
| Pune | India | PNQ | VAPO | Pune Airport | |
| Raipur | India | RPR | VERP | Swami Vivekananda Airport | |
| Rajahmundry | India | RJA | VORY | Rajahmundry Airport | |
| Ranchi | India | IXR | VERC | Birsa Munda Airport | |
| Salem | India | SXV | VOSM | Salem Airport | |
| Shimla | India | SLV | VISM | Shimla Airport | |
| Silchar | India | IXS | VEKU | Silchar Airport | |
| Solapur | India | SSE | VASL | Solapur Airport | |
| Srinagar | India | SXR | VISR | Srinagar Airport | |
| Thiruvananthapuram | India | TRV | VOTV | Thiruvananthapuram International Airport | |
| Tiruchirappalli | India | TRZ | VOTR | Tiruchirappalli International Airport | |
| Tirupati | India | TIR | VOTP | Tirupati Airport | |
| Tuticorin | India | TCR | VOTK | Tuticorin Airport | |
| Udaipur | India | UDR | VAUD | Maharana Pratap Airport | |
| Vadodara | India | BDQ | VABO | Civil Airport Harni | (Note: Appears in Airline Route post dated 27 March 2009; does not appear in final schedule (summer 2012)) |
| Varanasi | India | VNS | VEBN | Lal Bahadur Shastri Airport | |
| Vijayawada | India | VGA | VOBZ | Vijayawada Airport | |
| Visakhapatnam | India | VTZ | VOVZ | Visakhapatnam Airport | |
| Kathmandu | Nepal | KTM | VNKT | Tribhuvan International Airport | |
| Singapore | Singapore | SIN | WSSS | Changi Airport | |
| Colombo | Sri Lanka | CMB | VCBI | Bandaranaike International Airport | |
| Bangkok | Thailand | BKK | VTBS | Suvarnabhumi Airport | |
| Dubai | United Arab Emirates | DXB | OMDB | Dubai International Airport | |
| London | United Kingdom | LHR | EGLL | Heathrow Airport | |
