= Lengpui Airport =

Airport in Aizawl, India

- IATA: AJL; ICAO: VELP

Summary
- Airport type: Public
- Owner: Government of Mizoram
- Operator: Airports Authority of India
- Serves: Aizawl
- Location: Lengpui, Mamit district, Mizoram, India
- Elevation AMSL: 405 m (1,329 ft)
- Coordinates: 23°50′18.39″N 092°37′13.29″E
- Website: Lengpui Airport

Map
- Location of the airport in Mizoram AJL (India)

Runways
Direction	Length		Surface
Direction	m	ft	Surface
17/35	2,500	8,200	Asphalt

Statistics (April 2025 – March 2026)
- Passengers: 4,28,701 (▼ -13.1%)
- Aircraft movements: 4,154 (▼ -11.5%)
- Cargo tonnage: 1,221.1 (▼ -6.8%)
- Source: AAI

Lengpui Airport (IATA: AJL, ICAO: VELP) is a domestic airport serving Aizawl, the capital of Mizoram, India. Located in Lengpui within the Mamit district, the airport lies approximately 32 km north of Aizawl. It offers flights connecting to Delhi, Kolkata, Guwahati, Imphal and Silchar. Notably, Lengpui Airport is the first in India to be constructed by a State Government. The airport is also known as Aizawl Airport or Aizawl–Lengpui Airport, reflecting its role in serving Aizawl.

== History ==
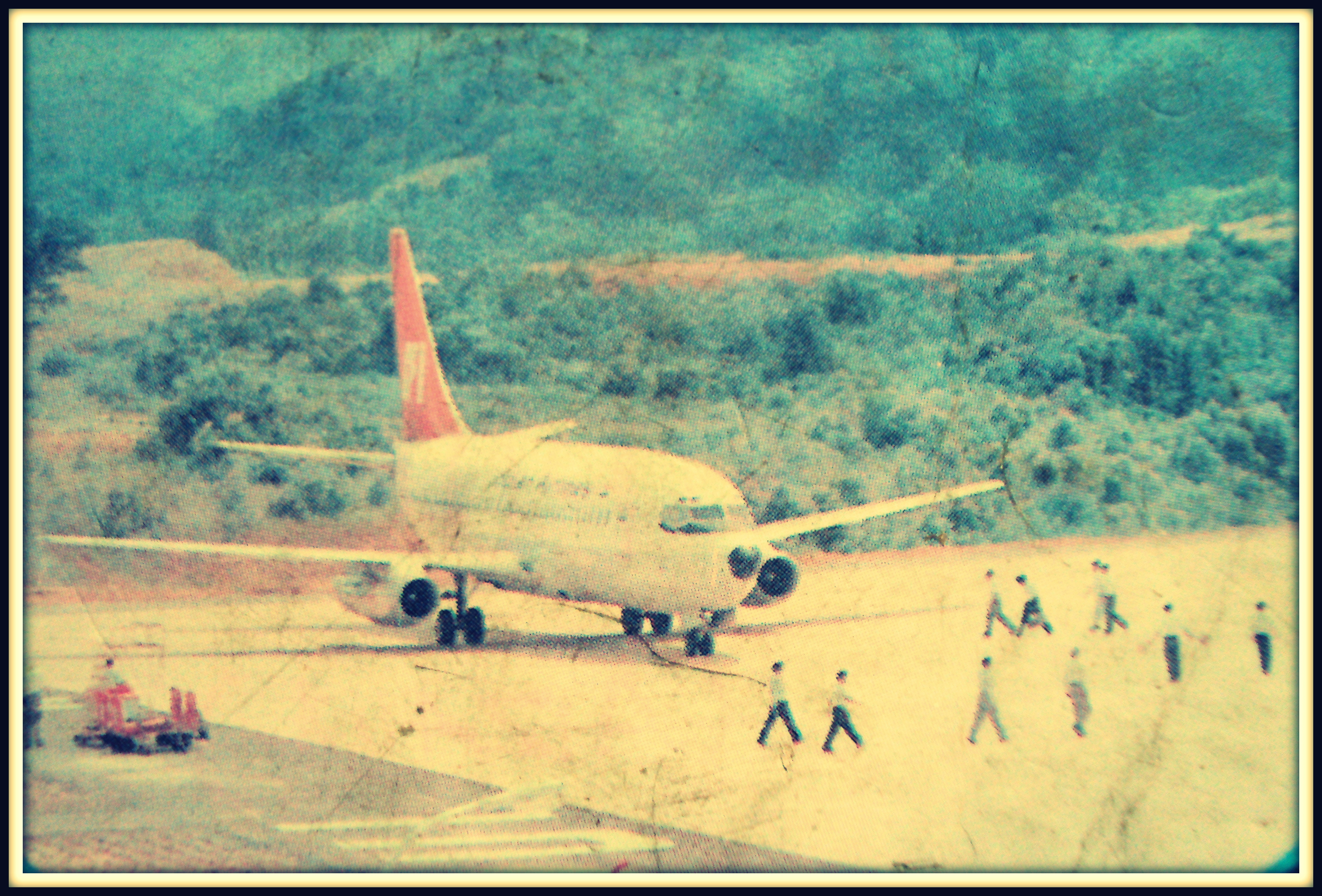
The very first trial flight at Lengpui Airport in 1999, operated by the then Indian Airlines, using its Boeing 737-200 aircraft.

The airport was constructed at a cost of ₹ 979 crore, and was completed in a record time of two years and two months. The construction work started in December 1995 and completed in February 1998. The airport was expected to be able to cater to 300 incoming and outgoing passengers. Before the construction of this airport, Aizawl was 130 km (81 mi) from the nearest railway head at Bairabi and 205 km (127 mi) from the nearest airport at Silchar. With regards to land acquisition, it has been found out that about 65 percent of the area acquired, belonged to some high government officials and political leaders at Aizawl, who started buying plots from people in Lengpui village at very low prices. They then donated the land to the government for the airport for which the rich persons got much more compensation as donors than the actual farmers. Previously, the airport was also served by Air Deccan which later became Kingfisher Red, but the airline stopped operating from the airport in April 2012.

== Technical details ==
The 2,500-metre runway of the Lengpui airport is unique in that it has many hilly streams running underneath. The airport is one of the airports in India that has a table top runway (others being Kozhikode, Shimla, Mangalore) which creates an optical illusion that requires a very precise approach from the pilot. At present, Lengpui Airport has installed a Cat I instrument landing system, which helps planes land safely during low-visibility conditions. A runway safety area and isolation parking bay are also planned. The Indian Air Force is planning to station at least 4 jet fighters at Lengpui airport. Indian Oil handles the aviation fuel service department of Lengpui airport.

== Renovation ==
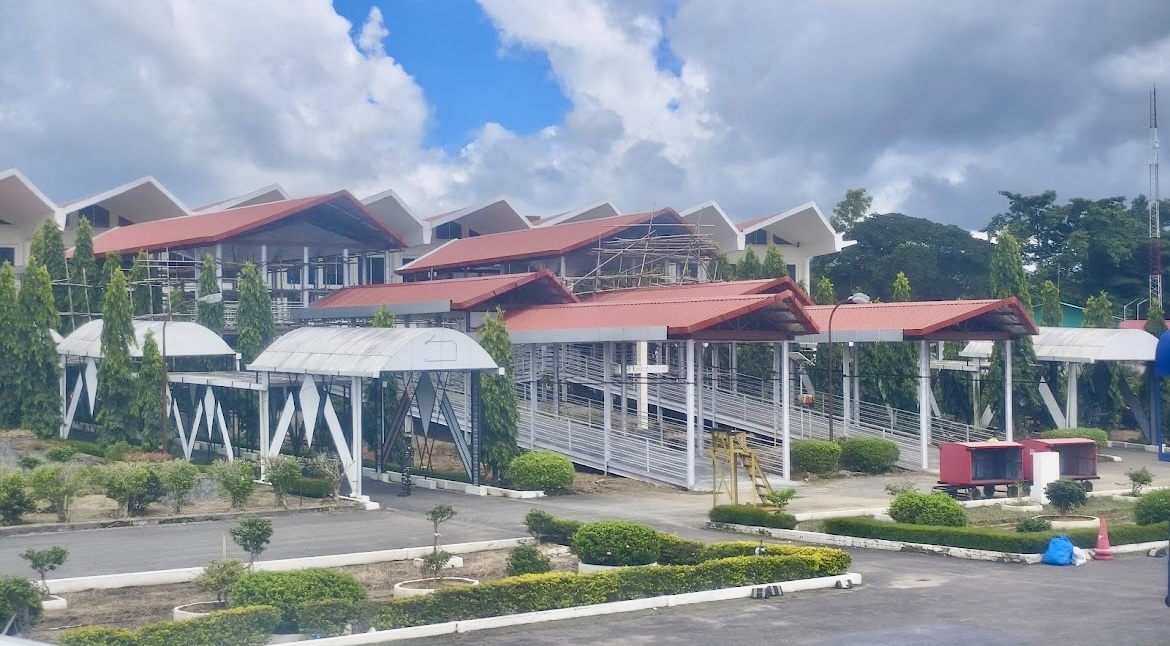
The new under-construction departure ramps (red roofs) seen from an aircraft.

Starting from 21 April 2021, Lengpui Airport is currently underway under a renovation project that will result in an upgraded terminal and an elevated roadway.

The programme 'Improvement/Upgradation of Operational/Non-Operational facilities of Lengpui Airport' is being funded under North East Special Infrastructure Development Schemes (NESIDS) and the Special Central Assistance (SCA) at a cost of Rs. 19.59 crores.

- The SCA is in charge of Earth works, Dismantling Item, PCC works, RCC works, Brick Walling, Plastering, Tile Flooring, Ceiling & Pannelling with ACO Board, Painting, Railing (Stainless Steel with Tuffen Glass), Door & Windows fittings, Temporary Laminated Board Partition, Roof Treatment, Sanitary Fittings, and Sub-Surface Cabel Channel.
- The NESIDS is in charge of Construction of Elevated Road, Construction of Departure Ramp (2 Nos), Extension of Baggage Make-up area, SITC of MRV/VRF Centralised Air Conditioners, Internal Electrification of Terminal Building, and Underground Cable (XLPE/PVC) for First Floor Conveyer Belt.

== Airlines and destinations ==
Airlines	Destinations	Refs.
Alliance Air	Dimapur, Guwahati, Imphal, Kolkata, Silchar, Shillong	
IndiGo	Agartala, Delhi, Guwahati, Kolkata	

== Statistics ==
=== Top flights ===
Busiest flights out of Aizawl–Lengpui by flight per weekly, As of 31 May 2024.
Rank	Destinations	Frequency (weekly)
1	(India) Guwahati	20
2	(India) Kolkata	14
3	(India) Shillong	8
4	(India) Imphal	7
5	(India) Delhi	5
6	(India) Silchar	1

== Helicopter Service ==
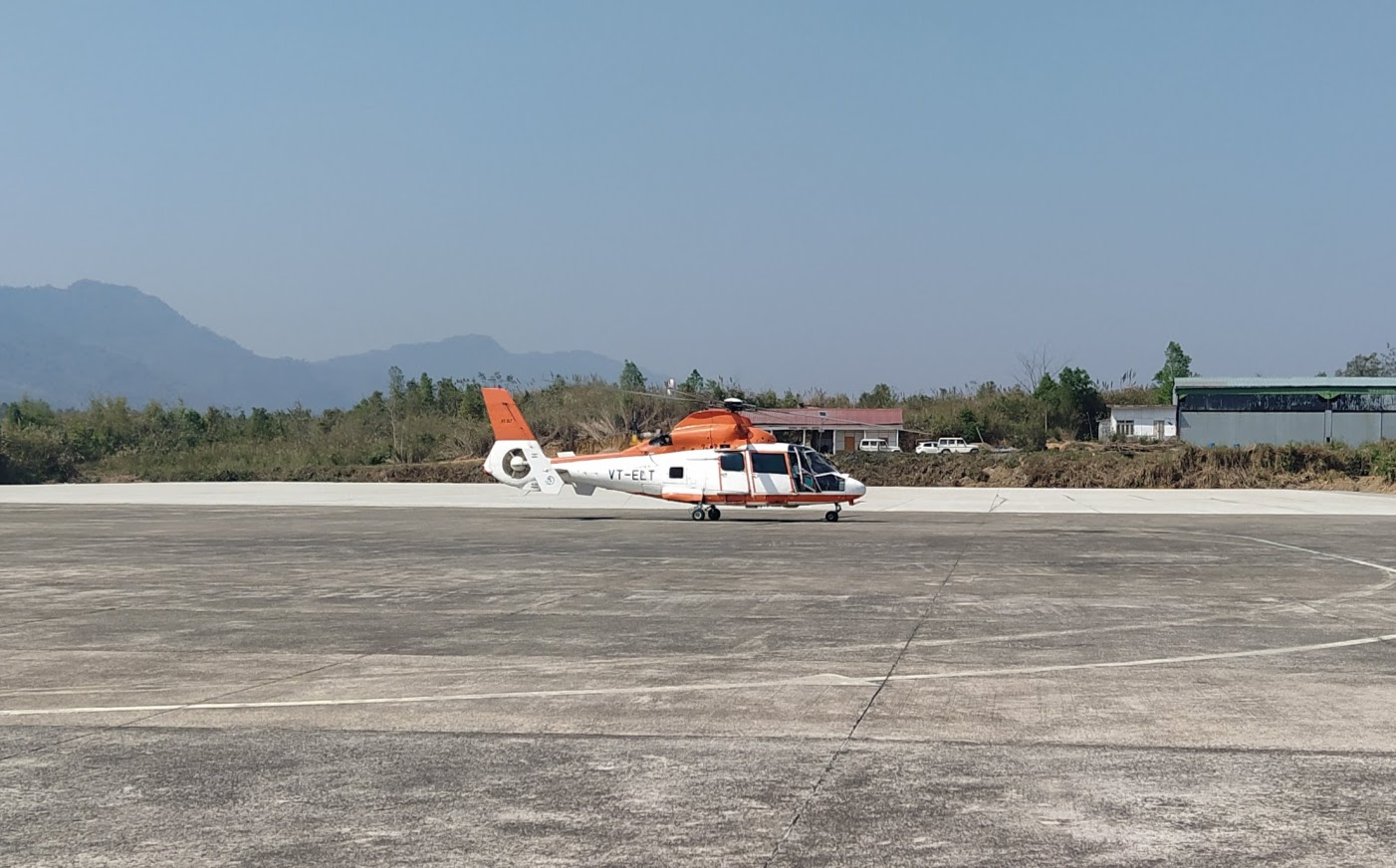
Pawan hans Helicopter Mizoram

A Helicopter service by Pawan Hans operating in Lengpui connects Aizawl with Lunglei, Lawngtlai, Siaha, Chawngte, Serchhip, Champhai, Kolasib, Khawzawl, Mamit and Hnahthial.

== Accidents and incidents ==
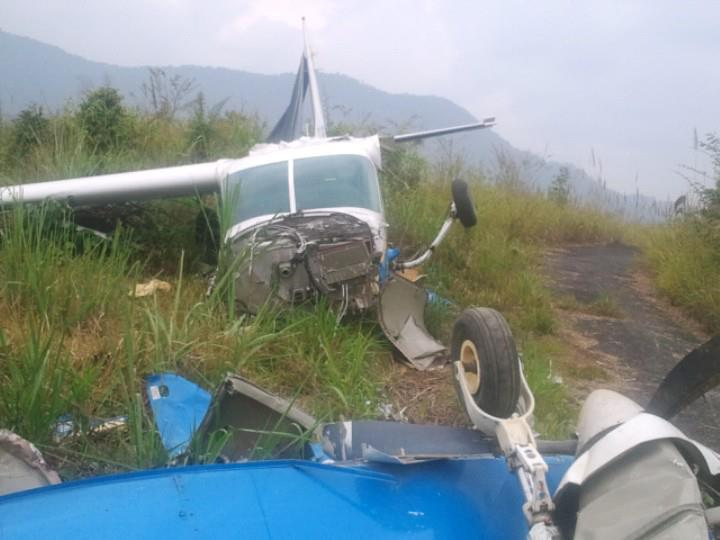
Crashed Northeast Shuttle aircraft at Lengpui Airport

- On 4 May 2011, a Northeast Shuttle's Cessna Caravan (VT-NES) crash-landed at Lengpui airport, overshooting the runway. While there were no fatalities, the aircraft was damaged beyond repair and was written off. The officials at Lengpui airport attributed the mishap to rainfall coupled with strong winds reducing visibility during landing. However, the DGCA enquiry reported the cause of the accident to be "inadequate skill level of the pilot to execute a safe landing during marginal weather conditions". The pilot had failed to execute a stabilized approach. As a consequence the aircraft touched down well past the runway threshold, overshot the runway, and fell into a ravine. The overshoot was a consequence of the pilot choosing to continue with the unstable approach, rather than going around to divert or make another approach. The DGCA also held the operator responsible for not ensuring that the pilot met the minimum regulatory requirements of the DGCA. The pilot was not cleared as per DGCA regulations to operate in airports situated in hilly terrain. The regulator also observed that the availability of a runway end safety area (RESA) and a functioning instrument landing system (ILS) would have increased the safety margin at the airport.
- On 23 January 2024, a Myanma army plane crash-landed at Lengpui Airport as it skidded off the runway. Out of the 14 people aboard, 6 were injured. 276 Myanmar soldiers fled to Mizoram due to the Myanmar civil war and on the day before the crash, a Burmese army plane took back 184 soldiers who fled to Mizoram. Then, the next day, it came back to take its remaining 92 soldiers back but skidded off the runway after a late touchdown and fell into a ravine.

== See also ==
- Vuakmual Airport
