= Shillong Airport =

Airport serving Shillong, Meghalaya, India

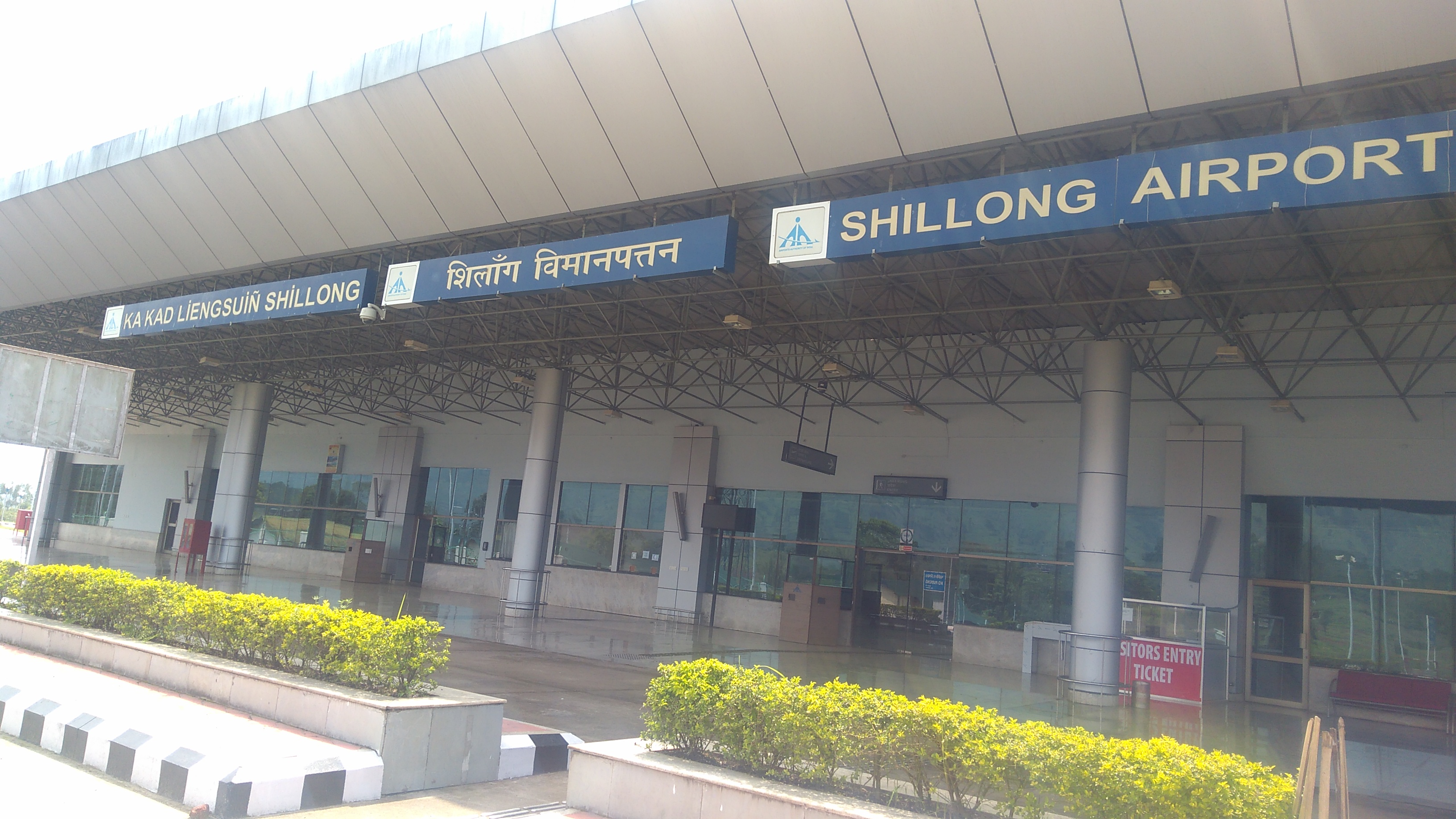
- IATA: SHL; ICAO: VEBI

Summary
- Airport type: Public
- Operator: Airports Authority of India
- Serves: Shillong
- Location: Umroi, Shillong, Meghalaya, India
- Hub for: IndiGo; Alliance Air
- Elevation AMSL: 887 m (2,910 ft)
- Coordinates: 25°42′13″N 091°58′43″E
- Website: Shillong Airport

Map
- Location of Airport in Meghalaya SHL (India)

Runways
| Direction | Length | | Surface |
| Direction | m | ft | Surface |
|---|---|---|---|
| 04/22 | 1,829 | 6,000 | Concrete |

Statistics (April 2025 – March 2026)
- Passengers: 96,716 (▼19.4%)
- Aircraft movements: 1,890 (▼28%)
- Cargo tonnage: 0 ( 0%)
- Source: AAI

Shillong Airport (IATA: SHL, ICAO: VEBI) is a domestic airport serving Shillong, the capital of Meghalaya, India. It is located at Umroi, situated 30 km (19 mi) from the city centre.

== History ==
The airport was constructed in the mid-1960s and became operational in the mid-1970s. Land measuring 224.16 acres was acquired for expansion of the airport in 2009. The work commenced in June 2009 and was completed in May 2010. The new terminal building, built at a cost of Rs. 30 crore, was inaugurated in June 2011.

In 2015, the Airports Authority of India (AAI) was allotted land for the further expansion of the airport. In 2017, AAI upgraded infrastructure at Shillong, with the installation of an Instrument landing system (ILS), construction of two refuelling facilities, extension of runway and removal of flight-path obstructions. The airport received its Category 3C license from the Indian DGCA in June 2019, allowing operations of Q400/ ATR 72 aircraft. IndiGo began operations using an ATR-72 from Shillong on 20 July 2019 under the UDAN scheme with a daily flight from Kolkata airport.

The present 6,000 ft runway was planned to be extended to about 8,000 feet to facilitate operation of narrow body jet aircraft like Boeing 737 and Airbus A320. However, this would require the cutting of clusters of hillocks that would come in the way of approaching aircraft after the runway was extended. The cost of this obstacle removal was ₹ 8,000 Crores. The Meghalaya Chief minister, Conrad Sangma stated that it would be difficult to go ahead with expansion of the airport at that cost.

In 2024, recent developments in the Shillong Airport expansion project aim to improve its capacity to handle larger aircraft. The project includes extending the existing runway by 900 meters to the south, which would enable aircraft like the Boeing 737 and Airbus A320 to operate. This expansion would require an additional 16 acres of land and 6 acres for the apron, where aircraft would be parked.

One of the key challenges for this project is obtaining exemptions from central government guidelines, as the estimated cost for necessary land acquisition and construction could reach ₹500 crore. While the environmental concerns regarding nearby hillocks were initially significant, officials have indicated that the extension plan to the southern end should avoid cutting into the hills, minimizing the environmental impact. The state government is working closely with the Airport Authority of India (AAI) and the central government to move the project forward.

== Airlines and destinations ==
| Airlines | Destinations |
|---|---|
| Alliance Air | Aizawl, Dimapur, Guwahati, Lilabari, Tezpur |
| IndiGo | Dibrugarh, Imphal, Kolkata |
| SpiceJet | Delhi |
