= VEAT =

VEAT may refer to:

- the airport code for Maharaja Bir Bikram Airport
- a Voluntary Ex-Ante Transparency Notice issued under the procedures for government procurement in the European Union
