= Multilingualism in India =

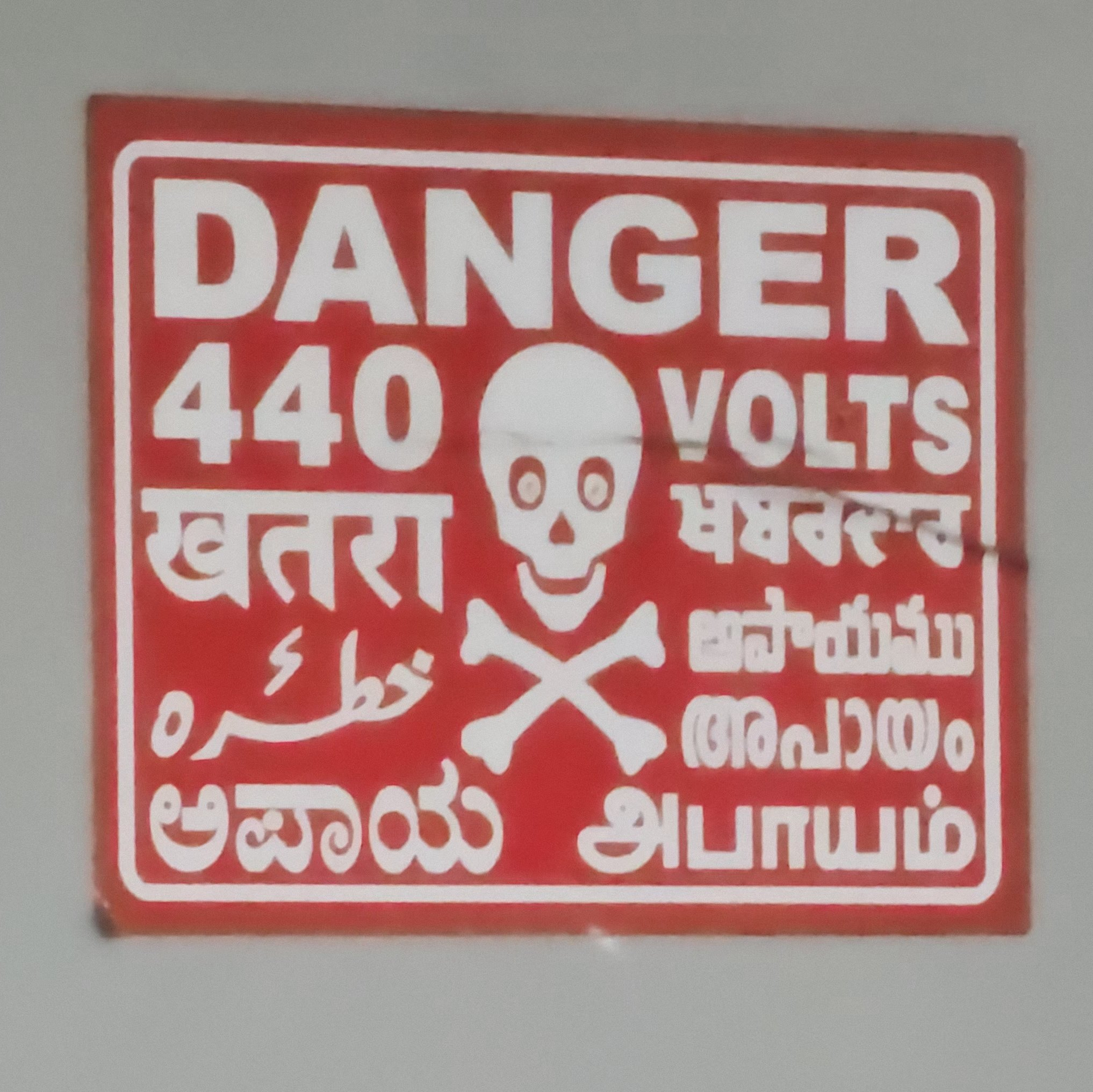
A danger sign in India containing 8 language, all using different scripts.

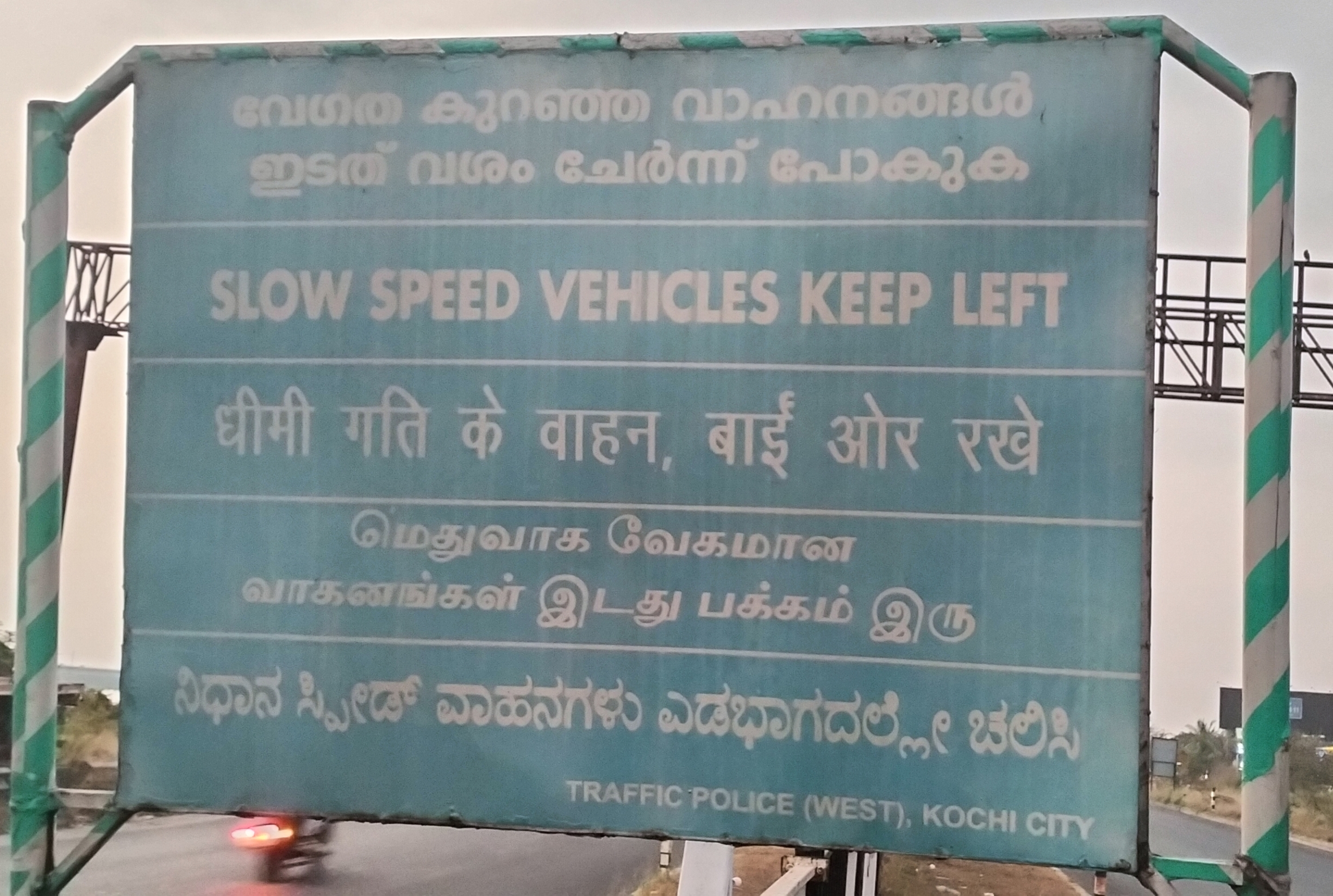
A pentalingual highway sign in Kochi written in Malayalam, English, Hindi, Tamil and Kannada.

The Constitution of India designates the official languages of India as Hindi and English. The number of bilingual speakers in India is 314.9 million, which is 26% of the population in 2011.

== Multilingualism ==
=== Hindi ===
Hindi is one of the official languages of India and had 528 million native speakers as of the 2011 Census. About 139 million Indians speak Hindi as a second language and 24 million speak it as their third language.

First, second, and third languages by number of speakers in India (2011 Census)
Language	First language speakers	First language speakers as a percentage of total population	Second language speakers	Third language speakers	Total speakers	Total speakers as a percentage of total population
Hindi	528,347,193	43.63	139,000,000	24,000,000	692,000,000	57.1
English	259,678	0.02	83,000,000	46,000,000	129,000,000	10.6
Bengali	97,237,669	8.3	9,000,000	1,000,000	107,000,000	8.9
Marathi	83,026,680	7.09	13,000,000	3,000,000	99,000,000	8.2
Telugu	81,127,740	6.93	12,000,000	1,000,000	95,000,000	7.8
Tamil	69,026,881	5.89	7,000,000	1,000,000	77,000,000	6.3
Gujarati	55,492,554	4.74	4,000,000	1,000,000	60,000,000	5
Urdu	50,772,631	4.34	11,000,000	1,000,000	63,000,000	5.2
Kannada	43,706,512	3.73	14,000,000	1,000,000	59,000,000	4.94
Odia	37,521,324	3.2	5,000,000	390,000	43,000,000	3.56
Malayalam	34,838,819	2.97	500,000	210,000	36,000,000	2.9
Punjabi	33,124,726	2.83	2,230,000	720,000	36,600,000	3
Assamese	15,311,351	1.26	7,488,153	740,402	23,539,906	1.94
Sanskrit	0	0	1,230,000	1,960,000	3,190,000	0.19

=== Multilingualism by state ===
Combined percentages of first, second and third language speakers of Hindi and English in India from the 2011 Census.

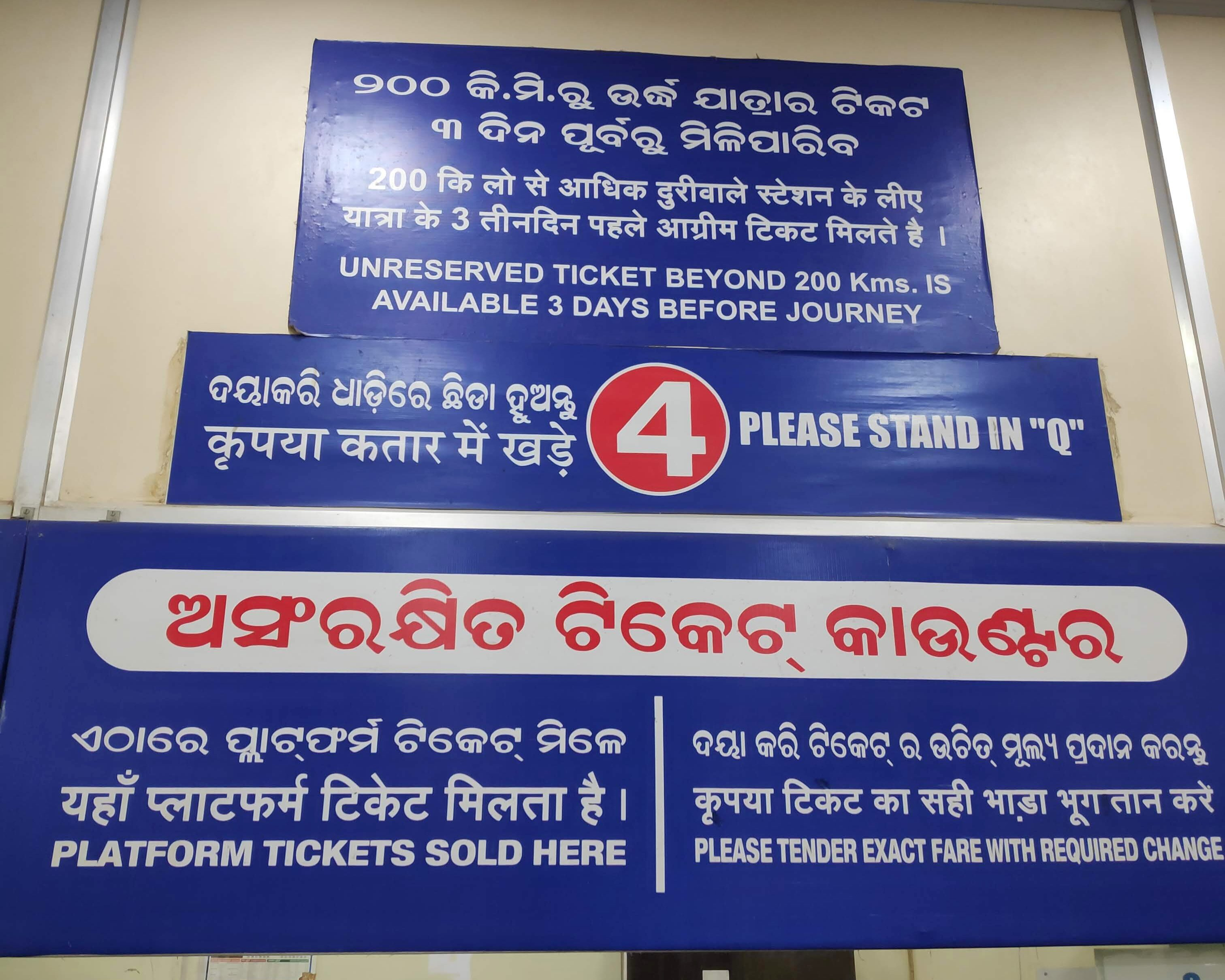
Trilingualism is common in Railway Stations of India. This signboard of a ticket counter in Bhubaneswar Railway Station has text in Odia, Hindi and English.

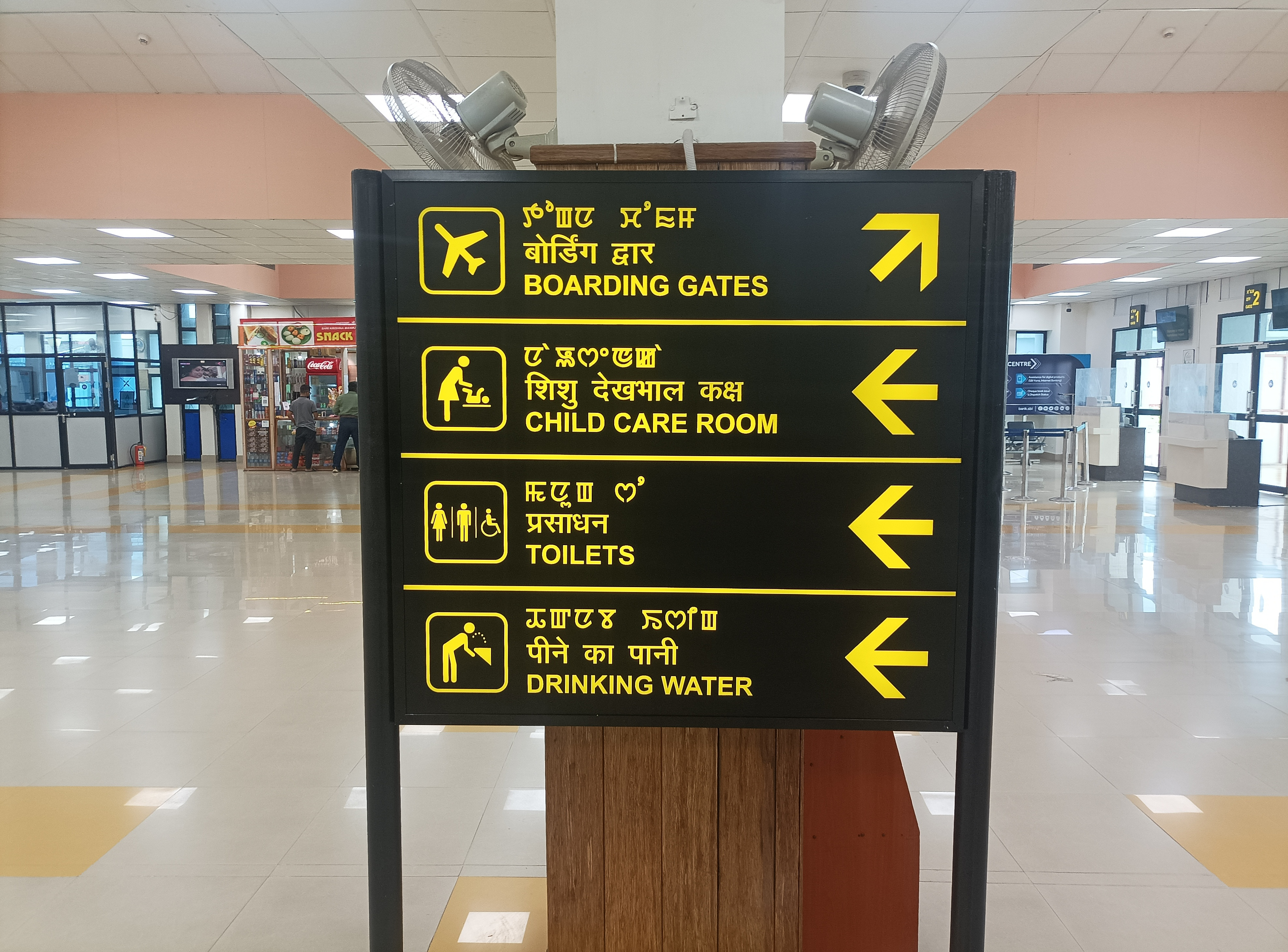
Multilingualism is also common in the international airports in India. The signboard is displayed in the Imphal International Airport in Meitei, Hindi and English.

Hindi and English Proficiency in 2011
State or union territory	Hindi	English
India	57.11%	10.62%
Andaman and Nicobar Islands	79.87%	21.94%
Andhra Pradesh (incl. Telangana)	12.59%	13.06%
Arunachal Pradesh	62.76%	23.08%
Assam	25.24%	8.05%
Bihar	89.37%	2.72%
Chandigarh	94.05%	41.62%
Chhattisgarh	93.64%	2.29%
Dadra and Nagar Haveli	57.50%	10.34%
Daman and Diu	76.19%	15.38%
Delhi	96.75%	31.72%
Goa	53.34%	41.80%
Gujarat	43.63%	12.44%
Haryana	95.34%	15.59%
Himachal Pradesh	96.57%	10.64%
Jammu and Kashmir (incl. Ladakh)	38.00%	15.98%
Jharkhand	85.43%	5.15%
Karnataka	12.27%	11.83%
Kerala	9.12%	20.15%
Lakshadweep	17.87%	19.30%
Madhya Pradesh	95.74%	5.44%
Maharashtra	52.09%	14.32%
Manipur	18.44%	31.62%
Meghalaya	13.95%	15.61%
Mizoram	7.01%	15.50%
Nagaland	15.89%	32.57%
Odisha	18.76%	17.23%
Puducherry	3.87%	28.10%
Punjab	51.04%	30.05%
Rajasthan	95.04%	4.55%
Sikkim	47.96%	27.69%
Tamil Nadu	2.11%	18.49%
Tripura	9.95%	7.53%
Uttar Pradesh	97.40%	6.42%
Uttarakhand	97.19%	8.36%
West Bengal	13.83%	6.70%

== See also ==
- Languages of India
- Languages with official status in India
- List of languages by number of native speakers in India
