= Silchar Airport =

Airport of Assam, India

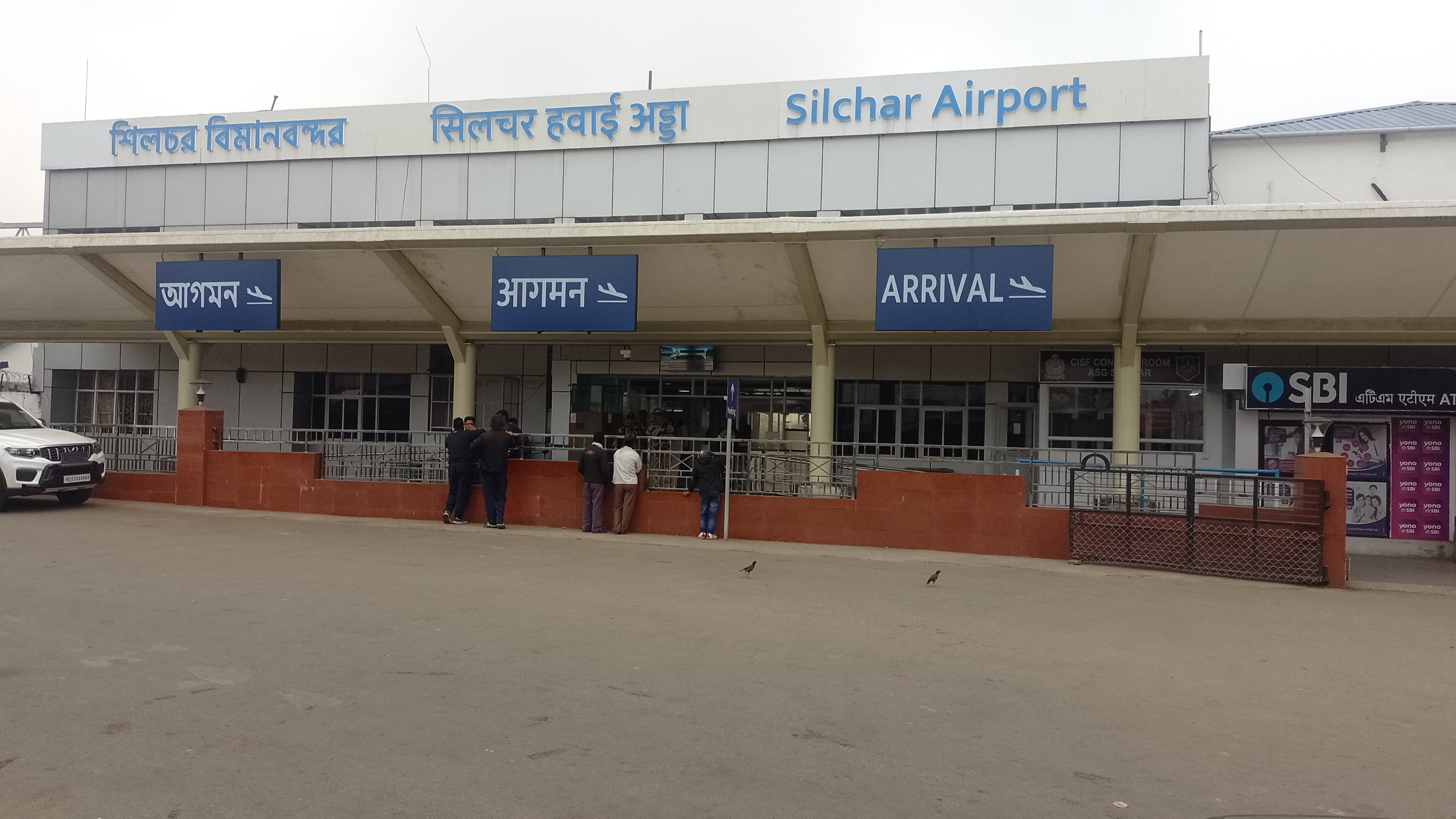
- IATA: IXS; ICAO: VEKU

Summary
- Airport type: Public/Military
- Owner: Indian Air Force
- Operator: Indian Air Force, Airports Authority of India
- Serves: Silchar
- Location: Kumbhirgram, Silchar, Assam, India
- Opened: 1944; 82 years ago
- Elevation AMSL: 352 ft (107 m)
- Coordinates: 24°54′47″N 092°58′43″E
- Website: Silchar Airport

Map
- Location of airport in Assam IXS (India)

Runways
Direction	Length		Surface
Direction	ft	m	Surface
06/24	7,500	2,286	Asphalt

Statistics (April 2025 - March 2026)
- Passengers: 4,24,453 (▼ -12.2%)
- Aircraft movements: 2,996 (▼ -22.3%)
- Cargo tonnage: 817.3 (▲25.4%)
- Source: AAI

Silchar Airport (IATA: IXS, ICAO: VEKU) is a domestic airport serving city of Silchar, Assam, India. It is located at Kumbhirgram, on the foothills of the Barail Range, 29 km (18 mi) from the city centre. It was built by the British as RAF Station Kumbhirgram in 1944 and transferred to the Royal Indian Air Force (RIAF).

On 1 June 1944, No. 81 Squadron RAF flying Supermarine Spitfires was located at RAF Kumbhirgram.

It is also a civil enclave airport as it is under the control of Indian Air Force.

It is the fourth-busiest airport of north-east India next to Guwahati, Agartala and Imphal. Passenger traffic in the airport showed a sharp growth of 72.9% in 2017–18, and handled 366,955 passengers. While in 2018–19, the traffic growth was reported 5.4% to 386,665. As of 2023-24 data available with the Airports Authority of India, the airport handled over 412,600 passengers, and is the 45th-busiest airport in India and the 47th-busiest in respect of aircraft movement. The airport is the 46th busiest in cargo transportation, as of 2023–24.

== Infrastructure ==
The airport's terminal handles domestic flights. It has a runway capable of handling aircraft such as the Boeing 737 and the Airbus A320. Amenities include a restaurant, handicrafts shop, ATMs, chocolates shop, and free WiFi. The runway is equipped with a precision approach path indicator (PAPI) visual aid for both sides of the runway, that enables pilots to maintain the correct approach (in the vertical plane) towards the airport. The instrument landing system (ILS) provides a direction for approaching when the aircraft tunes its receiver to the ILS frequency, it provides both lateral and vertical signals. A glide slope station which is an antenna array sited to one side of the runway touchdown zone is also available towards the runway.

== Facilities ==
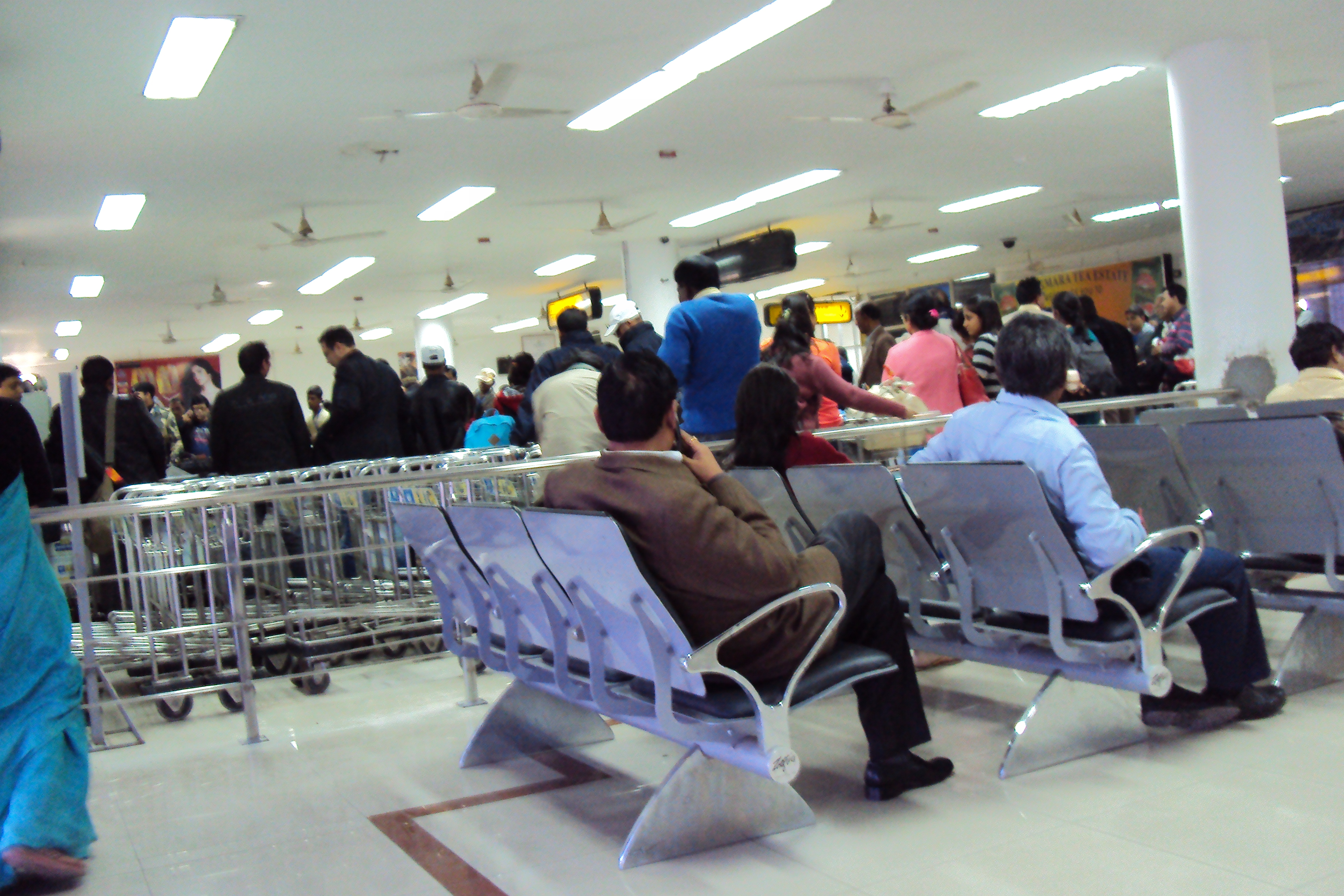
Inside the arrival lounge

Silchar Airport is situated at an elevation of 338 feet above sea level. It covers an area of 36.70 acres.

There is only one domestic terminal. It has four check-in counters along with four boarding gate to handle nearly 300 passengers at a given time, with 150 each at the arrival and the departure section. Restrooms are available for transit passengers with charges applied as per AAI rules. There are two conveyor belts available in the arrival building to support multiple aircraft at a time. Indian Oil handles the aviation fuel service department of Silchar Airport. There are a variety of options for eating and shopping on the airport premises. Shops selling local handicraft items are also there.

The airport comes under the administrative control of the Airports Authority of India. The guidelines prescribed by the Airports Authority of India are adhered to while carrying out the daily operations of Silchar Airport.

== Airlines and destinations ==
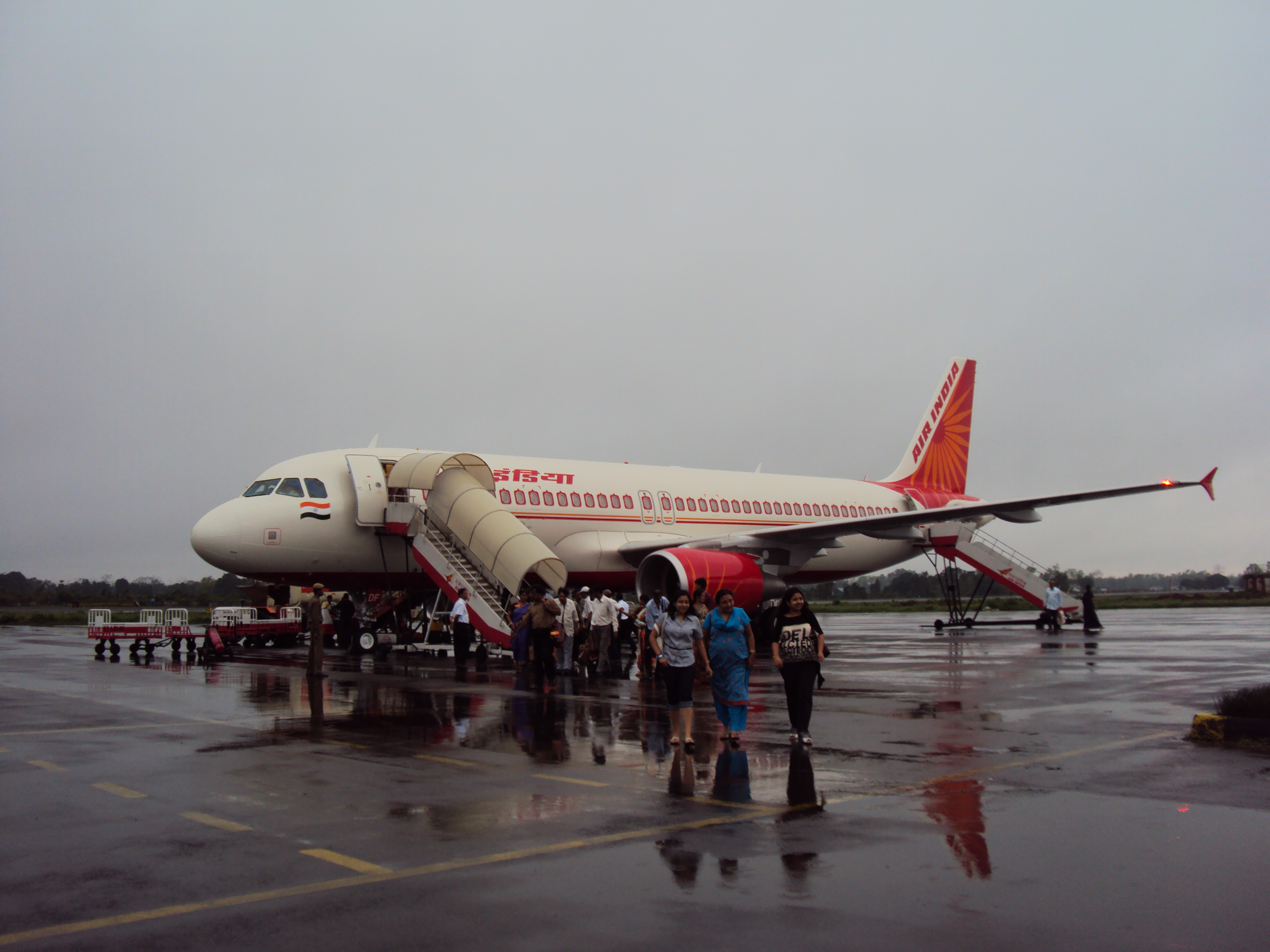
Apron area of the airport

Airlines	Destinations	Refs.
Alliance Air	Aizawl, Imphal, Kolkata	
IndiGo	Aizawl, Agartala, Guwahati, Kolkata	

== Transport ==
The Assam State Transport Corporation (ASTC) operates the Volvo air-conditioned bus services to Silchar airport from Rangirkhari Point and the Inter-State Bus Terminus (ISBT). From the ISBT one can find buses to other cities of the north-eastern region.

Taxis are also available to and from the airport to Hailakandi and Karimganj.
