= Koirengei Airfield =

Koirengei Airfield कोइरेंगेई हवाई क्षेत्र
- IATA: none; ICAO: none

Summary
- Location: Imphal Valley
- Opened: 1943
- Closed: 1959
- Coordinates: 24°52′21″N 93°55′31″E
- Interactive map of Koirengei Airfield

Runways
| Direction | Length | | Surface |
| Direction | ft | m | Surface |
|---|---|---|---|
| 16/34 | 4,900 | 1,949 | Asphalt |

Koirengei Airfield (also known as Imphal Main) is a defunct airport located in the Imphal Valley, India. It served as an important place during the Battle of Imphal as it received supplies and reinforcements.

== History ==
During the Second World War on 10 May 1942, the Japanese bombed the town of Imphal which did not have an airport at the time. Therefore a decision was made, on 1942, the United States Army Corps of Engineers (USACE) begun construction of the airfield, and completed it in 1943. The land needed for this airfield was acquired from its owners and also the State Government. Due to this, compensations were paid by the Army Department of India. Koirengei along with the nearby airfields helped prevent Japan's advance into India during the Battle of Imphal.

It was promised that after the war, the land would be transferred back to the State Government when the airfield no longer served a purpose. The Military Estate Officer was operating the airfield at Koirengei Airfield, while the Air Force was in charge of it.

=== Closure ===
After the Independence of India in 1947, the airfield was returned to civil purposes up until early 1959 when it was closed as Tulihal Airfield experienced major redevelopment for civil use. Only a few pieces of the runway remains today at Koirengei.

== Other airfields ==
The construction was part of a 6 airfield complex scattered around the valley. These include one at Palel, Tulihal, Thoubal, Sapam and Kangla Siphai. The airfields at Kangla, Wangjing and Sapam were carved out of paddy-fields at the time. Today, Tulihal Airfield (now Imphal Airport) serves as the main airport of Imphal Valley while a part of Palel Airfield still exists.

=== All weather airfields ===
- Tulihal
- Pallel

=== Fair weather airfields ===
- Thoubal
- Sapam
- Kangla Siphai

Only a partial of Koirengei Airfield acts as a landing ground for paragliders as a part of the annual Sanghai Festivals.
