= Bir Tikendrajit International Airport =

Airport in Manipur, India

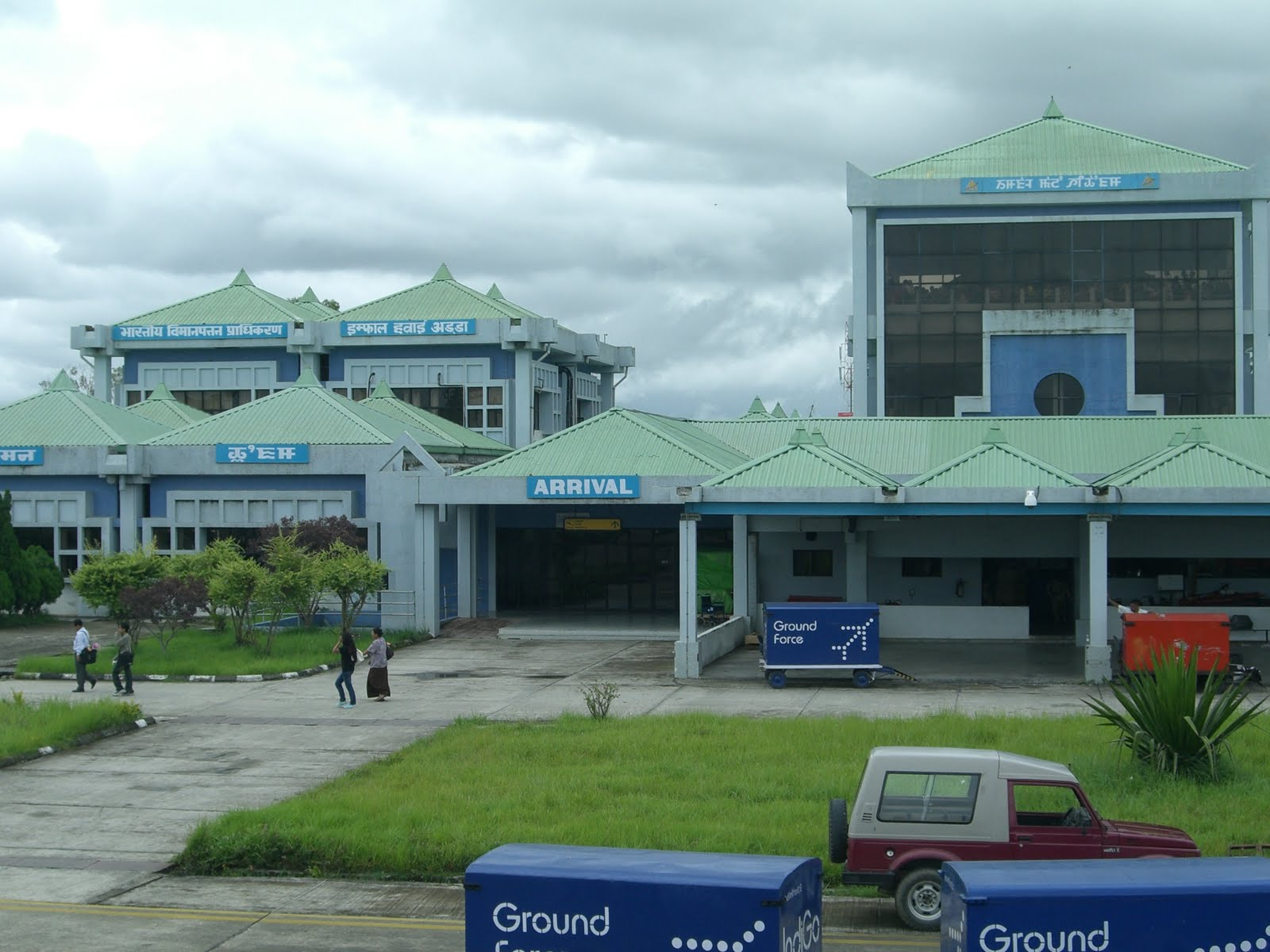
- IATA: IMF; ICAO: VEIM

Summary
- Airport type: Public
- Owner: Government of Manipur
- Operator: Airports Authority of India
- Serves: Imphal
- Location: Tulihal, Imphal, Manipur, India
- Elevation AMSL: 774 m (2,539 ft)
- Coordinates: 24°45′36″N 093°53′48″E
- Website: Imphal Airport

Map
- Location of airport in Manipur IMF (India)

Runways
Direction	Length		Surface
Direction	m	ft	Surface
04/22	2,746	9,009	Asphalt

Statistics (April 2025 - March 2026)
- Passengers: 13,66,765 (▼2.8%)
- Aircraft movements: 10,542 (▼14.9%)
- Cargo tonnage: 6,271.9 (▲1.2%)
- Source: AAI

Bir Tikendrajit International Airport (Note: "Bir Tikendrajit International Airport" is named after Bir Tikendrajit (Meitei name: Athouba Koirengsana), a Meitei prince of the Ningthouja dynasty of Manipur Kingdom) (IATA: IMF, ICAO: VEIM), also known as Imphal Airport, (Note: "Imphal International Airport" is the most common name but not the official name of the airport. It is called so because it is located in the Imphal city of Manipur.) and formerly known as Tulihal International Airport, (Note: "Tulihal International Airport" is named after "Ebudhou Tulihal", a Meitei guardian deity of the area where the airport is located.) is an international airport serving Imphal, the capital of Manipur, India, located 7 km south from the city centre. It is the second-largest and the third-busiest airport in Northeast India after Lokpriya Gopinath Bordoloi International Airport in Guwahati and Maharaja Bir Bikram Airport in Agartala. The airport had functioned as an all-weather Royal Air Force (RAF) base during World War II. It replaced civilian operations from Koirengei Airfield in 1959.

== Development ==
In June 2019, Airports Authority of India (AAI) implemented ₹3,400 crore (US$350 million) projects for the upgrading of various airports in the northeastern region. ₹720 crore (US$75 million) will be spent further upgrading of Imphal Airport. The project includes a ₹600 crore (US$62 million) integrated terminal building and airside infrastructure like new aircraft parking bays (areas at an airport where aircraft can be parked, unloaded, loaded, refuelled, boarded, or maintained) and link taxiways, a new Air Traffic Control (ATC) tower and a control and technical block.

The new terminal building will have an area of 28,125 sq.m. to handle 1,200 peak hour passengers (200 international and 1,000 domestic), an apron with four aerobridges and eight parking bays for Airbus A321 type aircraft, two link taxiways, and an ATC tower.

== Airlines and destinations ==
Airlines	Destinations
Air India Express	Delhi, Guwahati, Siliguri
Alliance Air	Aizawl, Dimapur, Guwahati, Kolkata, Silchar, Tezu
IndiGo	Agartala, Bangalore, Delhi, Guwahati, Kolkata, Shillong
Mingalar Aviation Services	Charter: Mandalay

== Statistics ==
=== Busiest flights ===
Busiest flights out of Imphal per weekly, as of 20 May 2025
Rank	Destinations	Frequency (weekly)
1	Guwahati	37
2	Kolkata	36
3	Delhi	11
4	Dibrugarh	7
5	Agartala	4
6	Aizawl	4
7	Shillong	3
8	Dimapur	2
9	Silchar	2

== Accidents and incidents ==
- On 16 August 1991, Indian Airlines Flight 257 crashed while on approach to the airport, killing all 69 people on board.

== Gallery ==
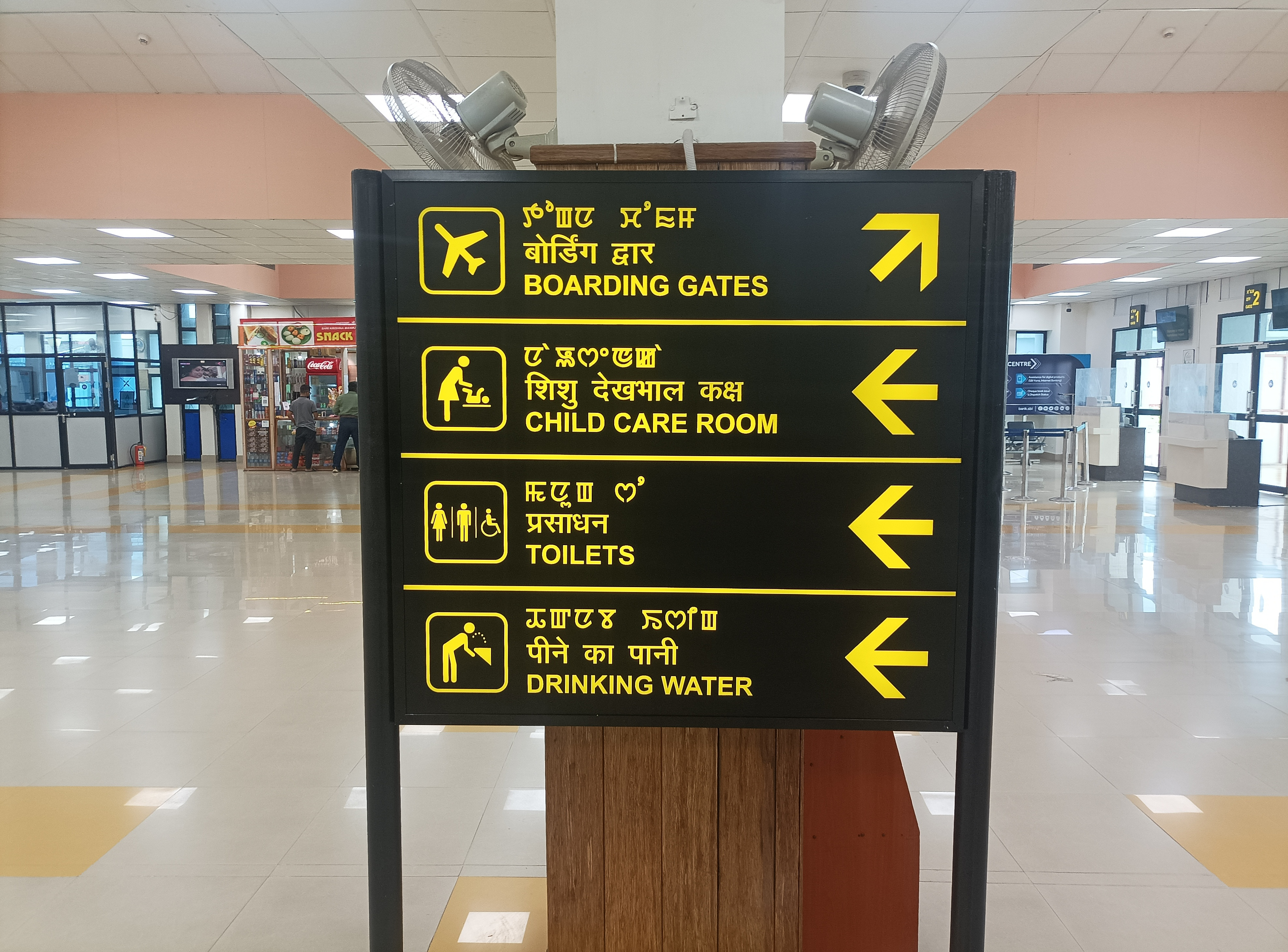
A trilingual signboard in the airport displaying in Meitei (officially called Manipuri), Hindi and English

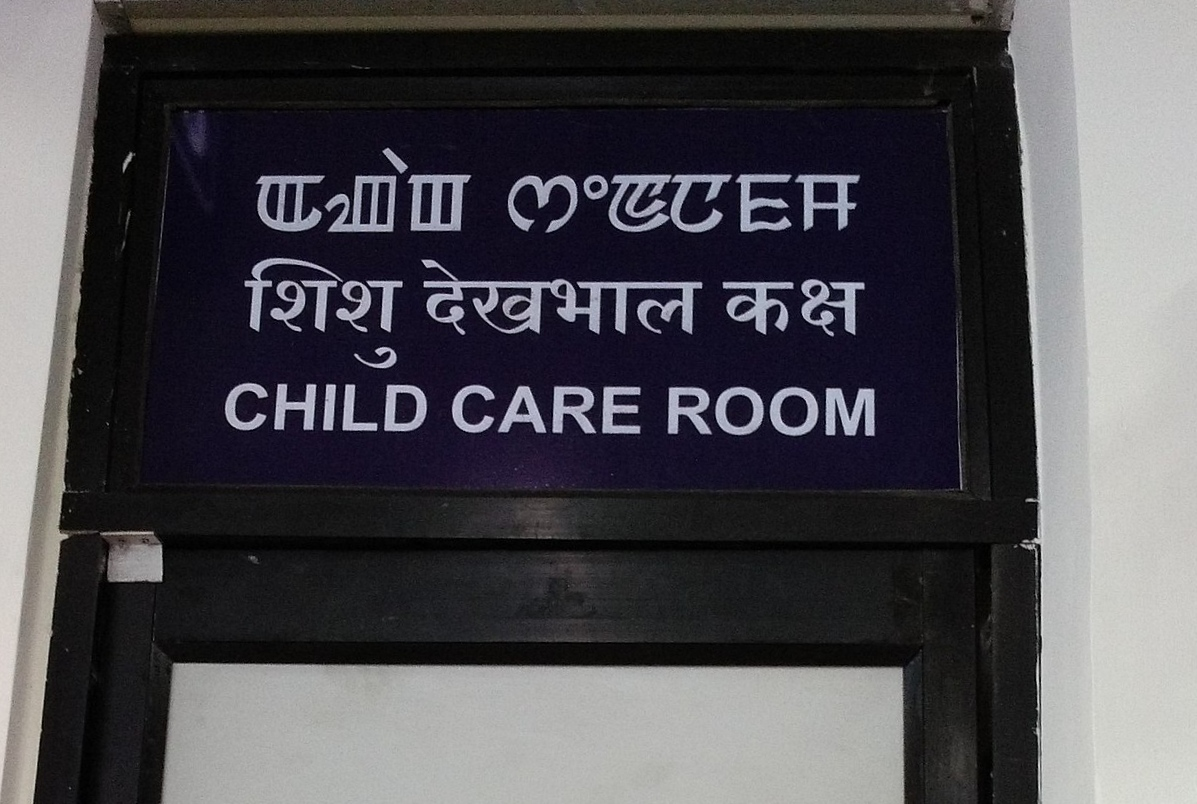
A Child Care Room in the Imphal International Airport with a signboard in Meitei, Hindi and English languages, showing official multilingualism in India

== See also ==
- Kangla Helipad (Manung Kangjeibung)
- Kakching Aerodrome
