= Dimapur Airport =

Airport of Nagaland, India

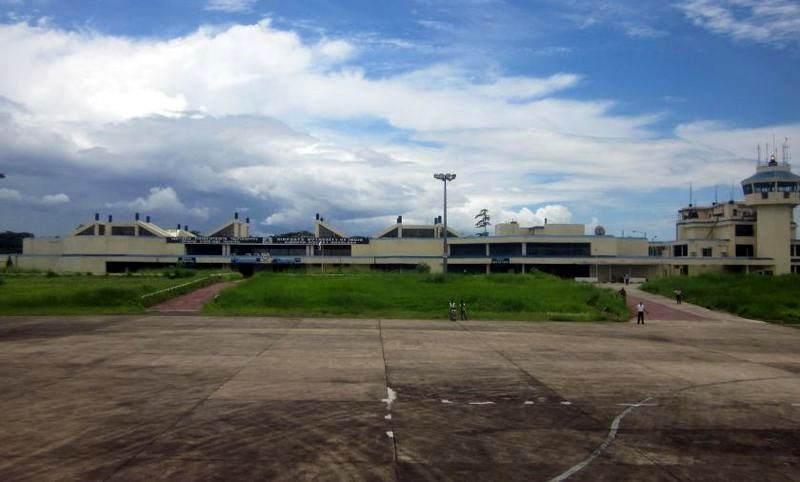
- IATA: DMU; ICAO: VEMR

Summary
- Airport type: Public
- Operator: Airports Authority of India
- Serves: Chümoukedima–Dimapur, Kohima
- Location: 3rd Mile, Diphupar, Chümoukedima District, Nagaland, India
- Elevation AMSL: 148 m (486 ft)
- Coordinates: 25°53′02″N 093°46′16″E
- Website: Dimapur Airport

Map
- Location of the airport in Nagaland DMU (India)

Runways
Direction	Length		Surface
Direction	m	ft	Surface
12/30	2,290	7,513	Asphalt

Statistics (April 2025 – March 2026)
- Passengers: 3,86,791 (▲14.8%)
- Aircraft movements: 4,558 (▲5.4%)
- Cargo tonnage: 1,309.1 (▲13.2%)
- Source: AAI

Dimapur Airport (IATA: DMU, ICAO: VEMR) is a domestic airport serving Chümoukedima–Dimapur and its neighbouring areas in the state of Nagaland, India. It is located between the districts of Chümoukedima and Dimapur, from where National Highway 29 (formerly NH-39) passes just beside the airport. It is the only airport in the state of Nagaland. The terminal building can handle 500 departing and 300 arriving passengers, and was built during World War II.

== History ==
It is the regarded as the birthplace of the Bangladesh Air Force. The latter started with a DC-3, Otter and Alluette helicopter. On 28 September 1971, three Pakistan Air Force pilots defected and along with a civilian pilot commenced their training with the Indian Air Force here. They became the first unit of the new air force.

== Airlines and destinations ==
Airlines	Destinations
Air India Express	Guwahati
Alliance Air	Imphal, Shillong
IndiGo	Delhi, Guwahati, Kolkata

== Accidents and incidents ==
- On 16 August 1991, Indian Airlines Flight 257 operating on the Calcutta–Imphal–Dimapur route crashed on approach to Imphal Airport, killing all 69 people on board. Of the 63 passengers on board, 31 were booked for Dimapur Airport.

== See also ==
- Kohima Chiethu Airport
- List of airports in Nagaland
