= Dibrugarh Airport =

Airport in Assam, India

Dr Bhupen Hazarika Airport
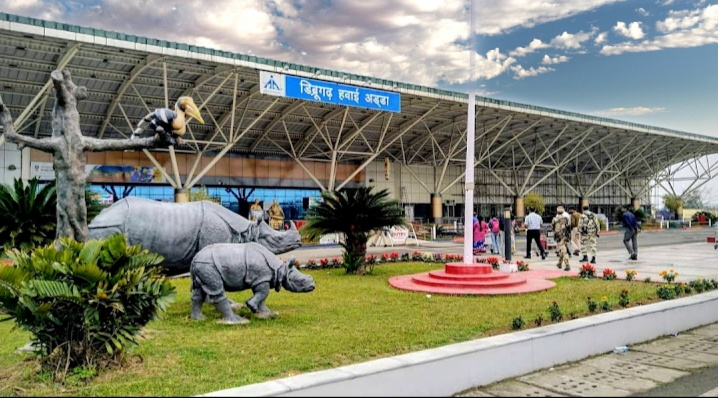
- IATA: DIB; ICAO: VEMN

Summary
- Airport type: Public
- Operator: Airports Authority of India
- Serves: Dibrugarh
- Location: Mohanbari, Dibrugarh, Assam, India
- Elevation AMSL: 360 ft (110 m)
- Coordinates: 27°29′1.19″N 095°01′0.60″E
- Website: Dibrugarh Airport

Map
- Location of the airport in Assam DIB (India)

Runways
Direction	Length		Surface
Direction	m	ft	Surface
05/23	2,286	7,500	Asphalt/Concrete

Statistics (April 2025 - March 2026)
- Passengers: 8,38,752 (▲2%)
- Aircraft movements: 6,602 (▼ -5.4%)
- Cargo tonnage: 1090.9 (▲14.2%)
- Source: AAI

Dibrugarh Airport (IATA: DIB, ICAO: VEMN) (officially Dr Bhupen Hazarika Airport) is a domestic airport serving the city of Dibrugarh, Assam, India. It is located at Mohanbari, which is situated 15 km (9.3 mi) east from the city centre. The airport covers an area of 386 acres. There are 2 aerobridges linked with the terminal. The runway of the airport is capable of handling aircraft like Airbus A320 and Boeing 737.

== History ==
The airport was established in the early 1950s. In February 2009, a new terminal building was opened, which has the ability to handle 500 passengers at a time. It is one of the 10 busiest airports in Northeast India after Guwahati, Agartala, and Imphal.

== Statistics ==
There was a problem during the HTTP request: 503 Service Unavailable

== Airlines and destinations ==
Airlines	Destinations
Air India Express	Delhi, Guwahati, Siliguri
Akasa Air	Bengaluru, Siliguri
IndiGo	Agartala, Bengaluru, Delhi, Guwahati, Hyderabad, Kolkata

== Gallery ==
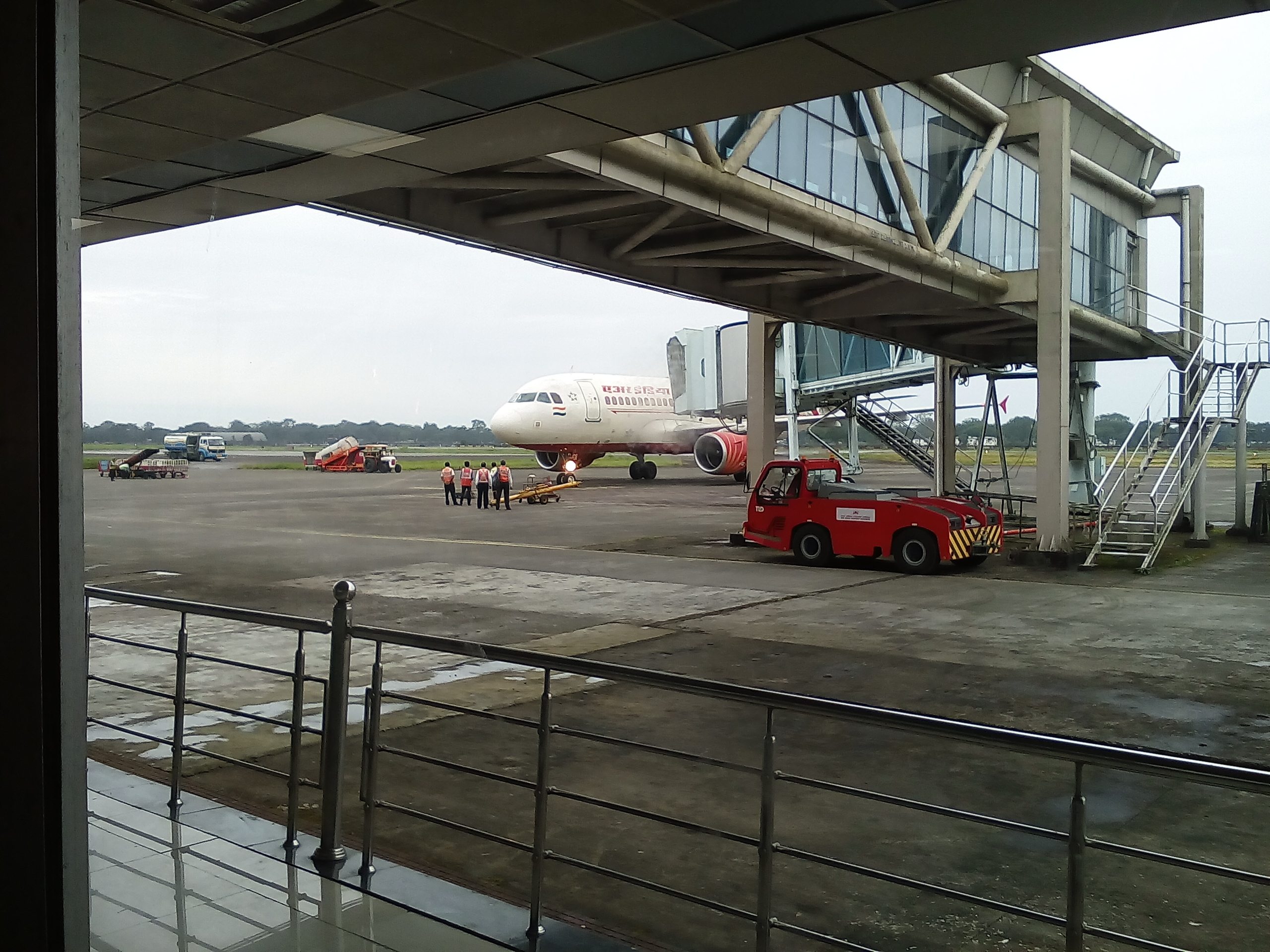
Air India Airbus A319 aircraft after arriving from Kolkata

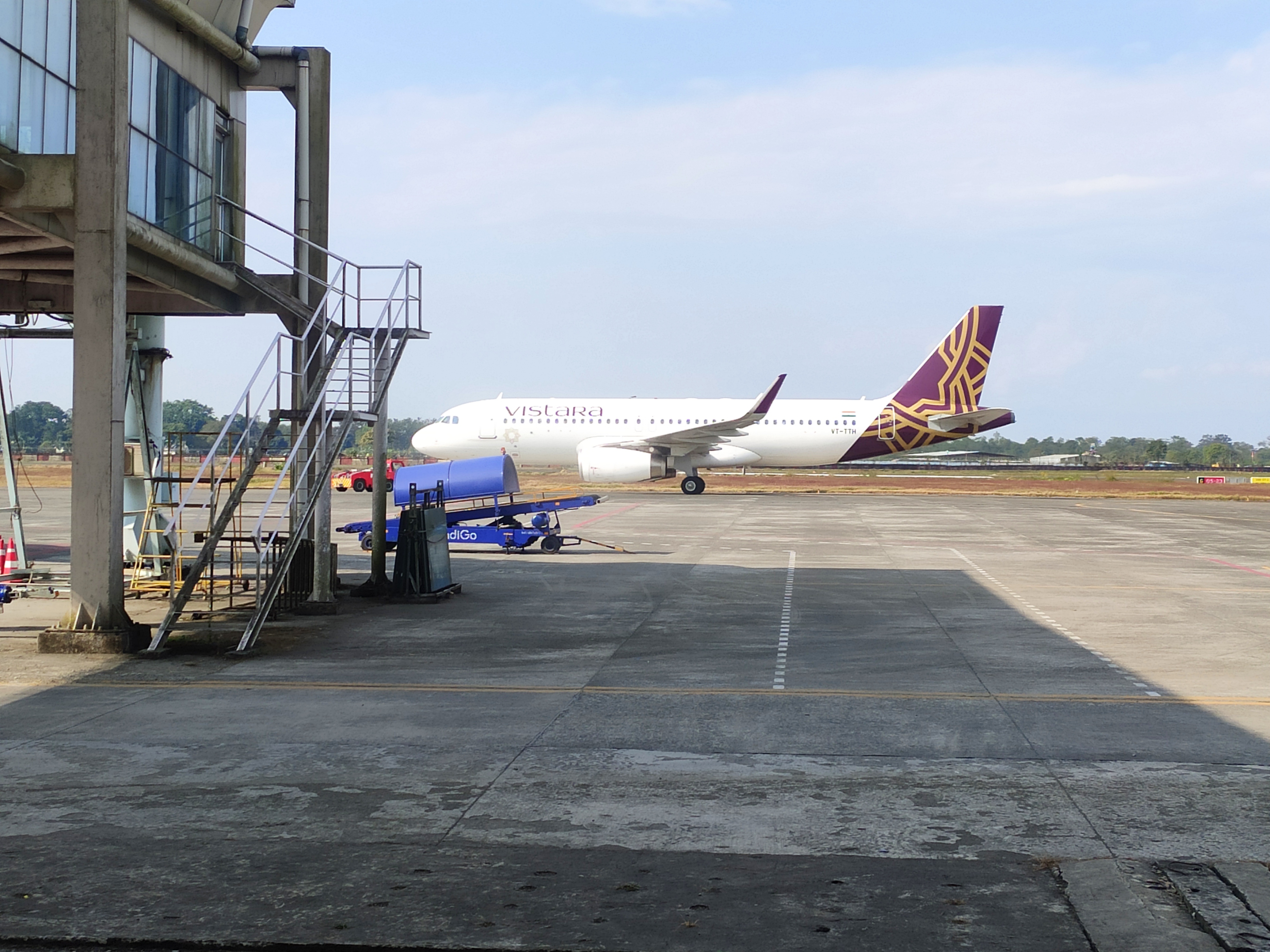
Vistara A320 aircraft preparing for a flight to Bagdogra

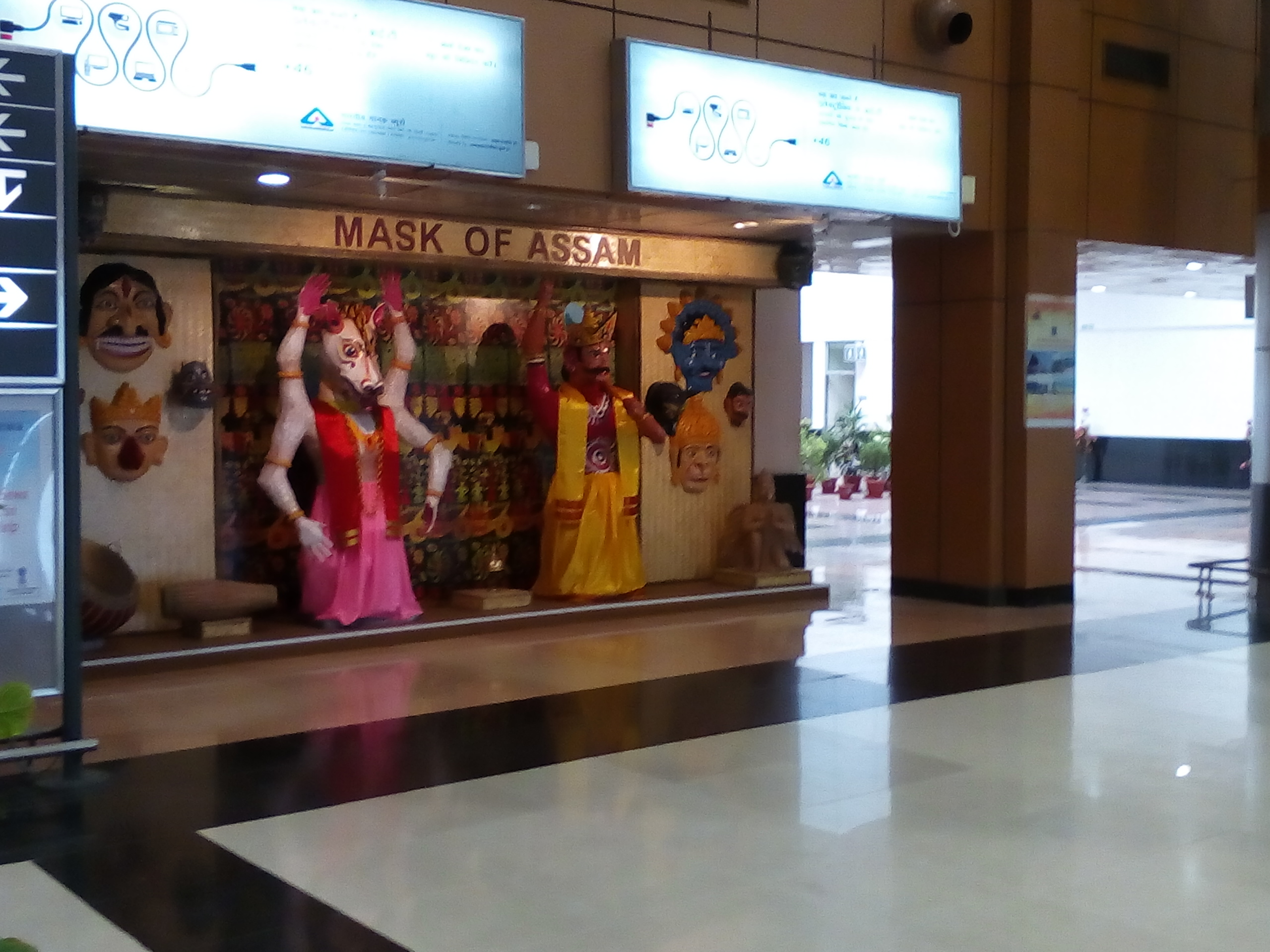
Interior of the Airport

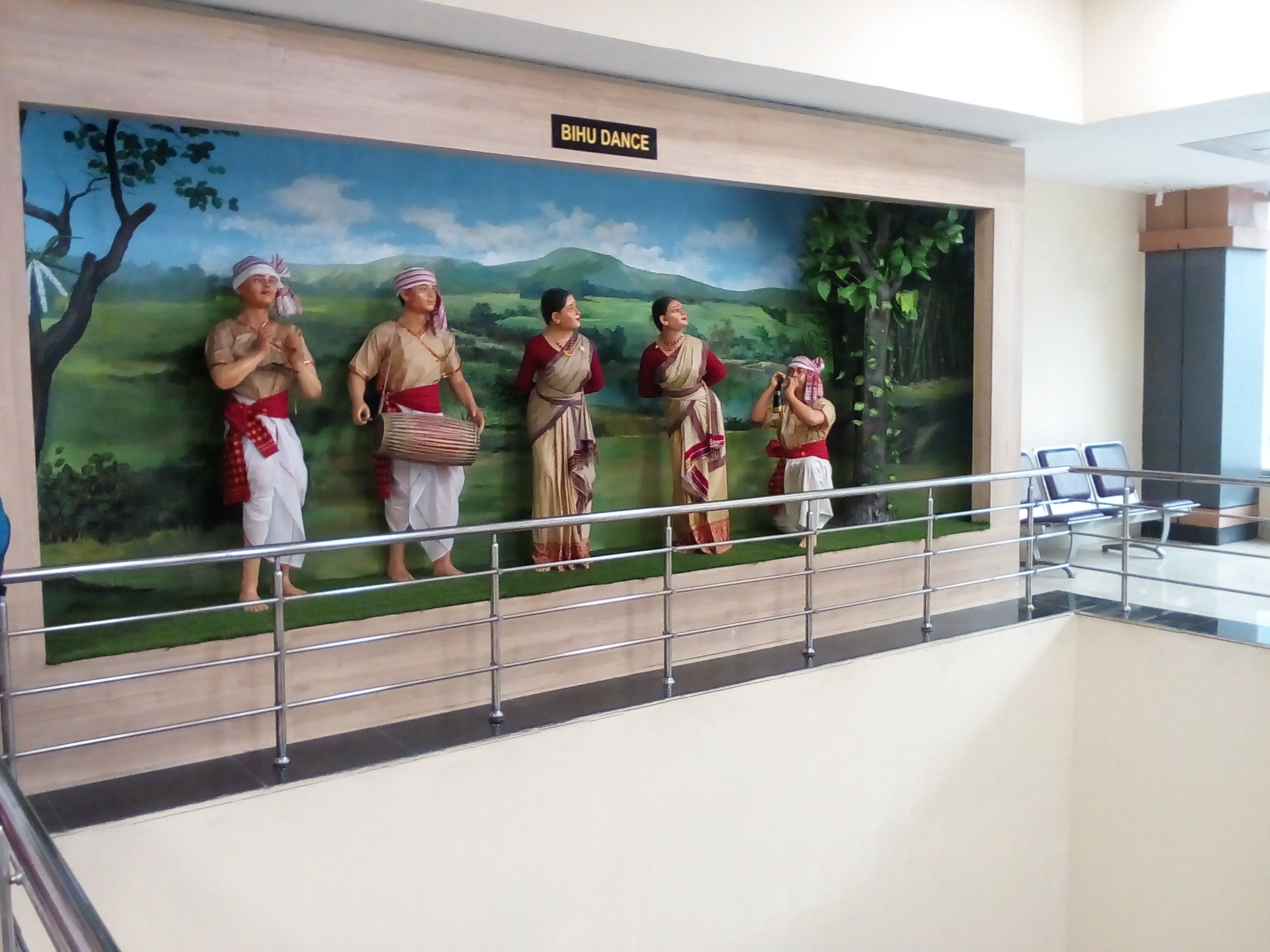
Bihu Dance showcase

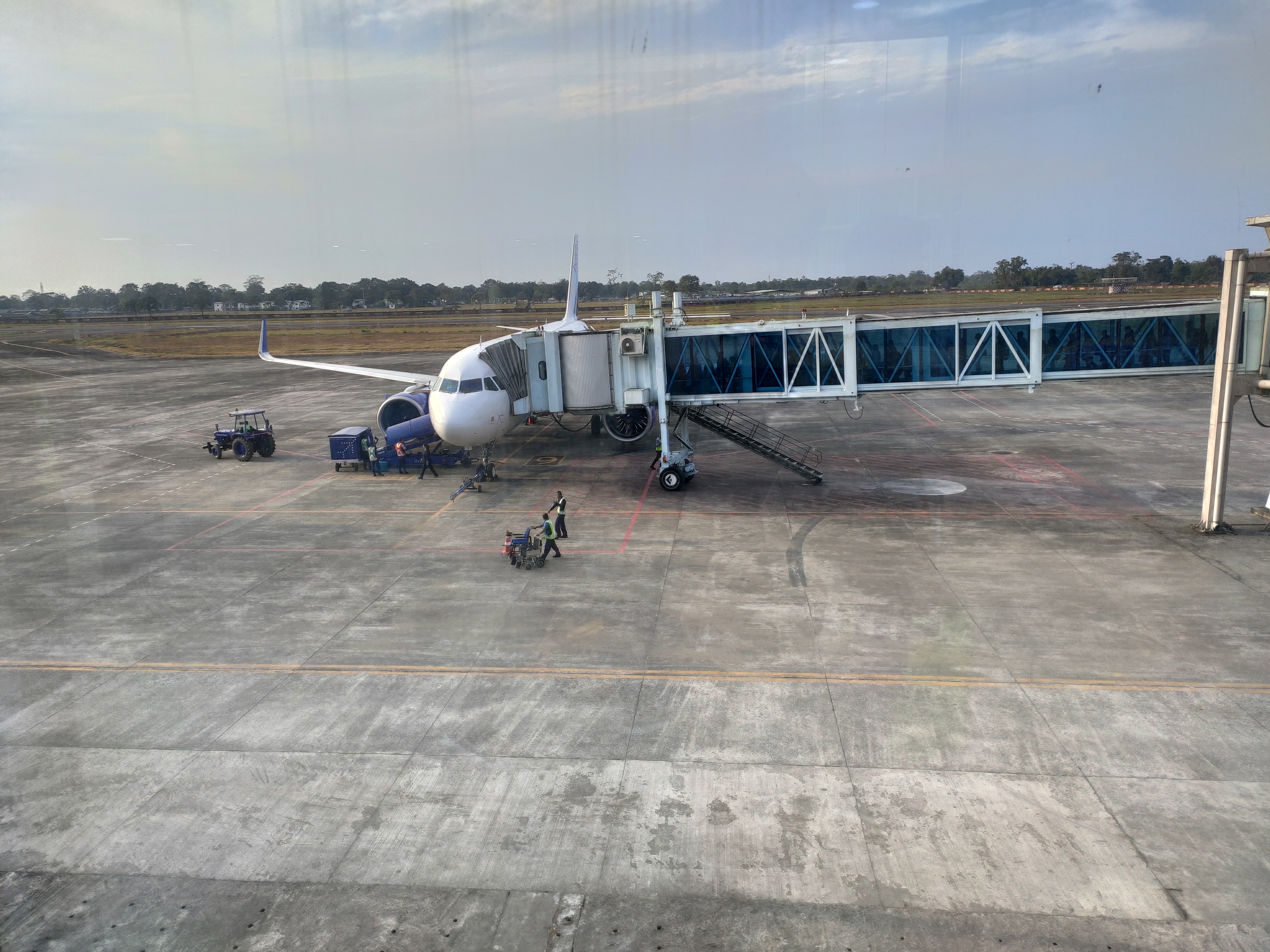
IndiGo A320neo aircraft preparing for a flight to New Delhi
