= Lengpui =

- town
- Location within Mizoram Location within India
- Coordinates: 23°50′18″N 92°37′13″E
- Country: India
- State: Mizoram
- District: Aizawl

Population (2011)
  - Total: 3,282

Languages
  - Official: Mizo
- Time zone: UTC+5:30 (IST)
- Postal code: 796421
- Vehicle registration: MZ-01
- Climate: Cwa
- Website: mizoram.nic.in

Lengpui is a census town located within the Aizawl district in the Indian state of Mizoram.[1] It is situated near the state capital, Aizawl, with an approximate transit distance of 35 kilometres (22 mi). Geographically and for local administration, the town is under the Tlangnuam RD Block of Aizawl District; however, for political administration, it falls under the Mamit Assembly Constituency. The postal PIN code for Lengpui is 796421. The town is primarily known for hosting Lengpui Airport, the only operational domestic airport in Mizoram.

== Climate ==
Climate data for Lengpui (1991–2020)
Month	Jan	Feb	Mar	Apr	May	Jun	Jul	Aug	Sep	Oct	Nov	Dec	Year
Record high °C (°F)	32.8 (91.0)	33.8 (92.8)	36.2 (97.2)	38.8 (101.8)	36.8 (98.2)	35.8 (96.4)	35.7 (96.3)	35.5 (95.9)	35.7 (96.3)	34.7 (94.5)	32.8 (91.0)	30.9 (87.6)	38.8 (101.8)
Mean daily maximum °C (°F)	24.8 (76.6)	27.6 (81.7)	31.0 (87.8)	32.3 (90.1)	31.8 (89.2)	31.3 (88.3)	31.2 (88.2)	31.1 (88.0)	30.9 (87.6)	29.9 (85.8)	27.8 (82.0)	25.0 (77.0)	29.6 (85.3)
Mean daily minimum °C (°F)	9.7 (49.5)	11.4 (52.5)	15.3 (59.5)	18.6 (65.5)	20.7 (69.3)	22.6 (72.7)	22.8 (73.0)	22.7 (72.9)	22.2 (72.0)	20.2 (68.4)	15.4 (59.7)	11.1 (52.0)	17.7 (63.9)
Record low °C (°F)	5.0 (41.0)	4.4 (39.9)	7.8 (46.0)	12.8 (55.0)	15.3 (59.5)	19.3 (66.7)	19.2 (66.6)	19.6 (67.3)	16.5 (61.7)	12.4 (54.3)	7.3 (45.1)	5.3 (41.5)	4.4 (39.9)
Average rainfall mm (inches)	6.9 (0.27)	13.2 (0.52)	58.7 (2.31)	208.8 (8.22)	330.7 (13.02)	373.6 (14.71)	348.6 (13.72)	372.5 (14.67)	344.2 (13.55)	197.1 (7.76)	26.4 (1.04)	10.1 (0.40)	2,290.9 (90.19)
Average rainy days	0.8	1.4	3.2	9.9	15.1	16.6	17.7	18.7	15.9	9.6	1.8	0.6	111.3
Average relative humidity (%) (at 17:30 IST)	72	58	53	60	71	81	83	84	85	86	80	80	74
Source: India Meteorological Department

== Demographics ==
According to the Census of India, Lengpui is a Notified Town with a population of 3,282 residents across 735 households, comprising 1,670 males and 1,612 females. The town features a literacy rate of 97.83%, with male literacy at 98.37% and female literacy at 97.28%.

== Economy ==
=== Economy and Occupation ===
The economy of Lengpui is diverse, with government services and commercial enterprises being the primary sources of livelihood for the majority of the population. A significant number of local residents are employed in various government sectors, alongside those engaged in local retail, shopkeeping, and business activities. Lengpui Airport serves as a major hub for employment, supporting a thriving local transportation sector. This includes standard commercial taxis, two-wheeler taxis (scooter taxis), and Maxi-Cabs/Sumos that provide essential transit services for passengers travelling to and from the airport and Aizawl. While agriculture and farming were traditionally the main occupations, they now constitute a smaller portion of the economy, practiced by a lesser percentage of the population.

=== Shifting Occupational Trends ===
Traditional shifting cultivation (locally known as tlangram lo) has largely decreased among the population, with minimal numbers relying on traditional hill farming. The majority of the local workforce is engaged in daily wage labor, private commercial businesses, and government services.

=== Aviation and Transport Sector ===
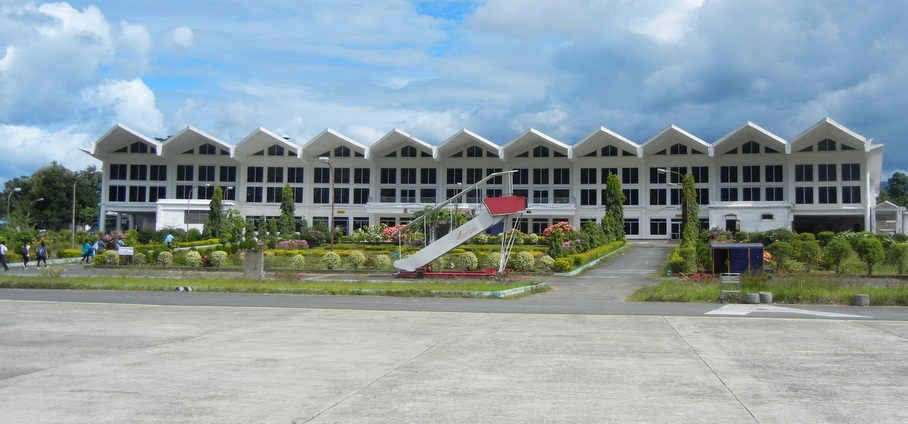
Lengpui Airport

The presence of Lengpui Airport serves as a major driver of non-agrarian employment in the town. Due to commuter transit requirements, the commercial transport sector supports a significant portion of the local population, with residents working as commercial taxi operators, maxi-cab operators, and auto-rickshaw drivers.
