= Bagdogra Airport =

Airport in Siliguri, West Bengal, India

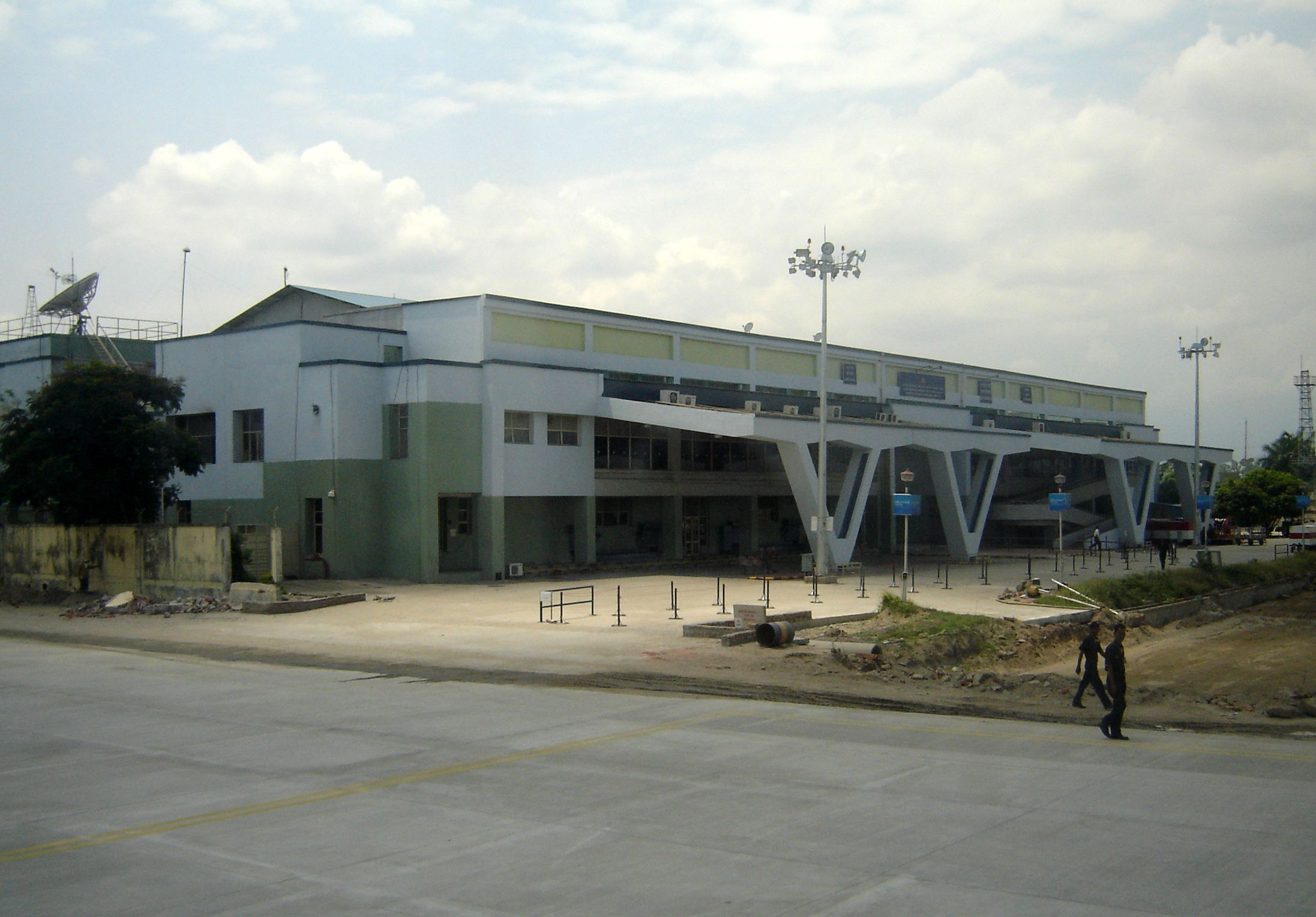
- IATA: IXB; ICAO: VEBD

Summary
- Airport type: Customs
- Owner: Indian Air Force
- Operator: Airports Authority of India
- Serves: Siliguri
- Location: Bagdogra, Siliguri, West Bengal, India
- Elevation AMSL: 126 m (413 ft)
- Coordinates: 26°40′52″N 088°19′43″E
- Website: www.aai.aero/en/airports/bagdogra

Map
- Location within West Bengal Location within India

Runways
Direction	Length		Surface
Direction	m	ft	Surface
18/36	2,754	9,035	Concrete/Asphalt

Statistics (April 2025 - March 2026)
- Passengers: 36,57,078 (▲13.6%)
- Aircraft movements: 24,930 (▲11.3%)
- Cargo tonnage: 9,351.8 (▲4.5%)
- Source: AAI

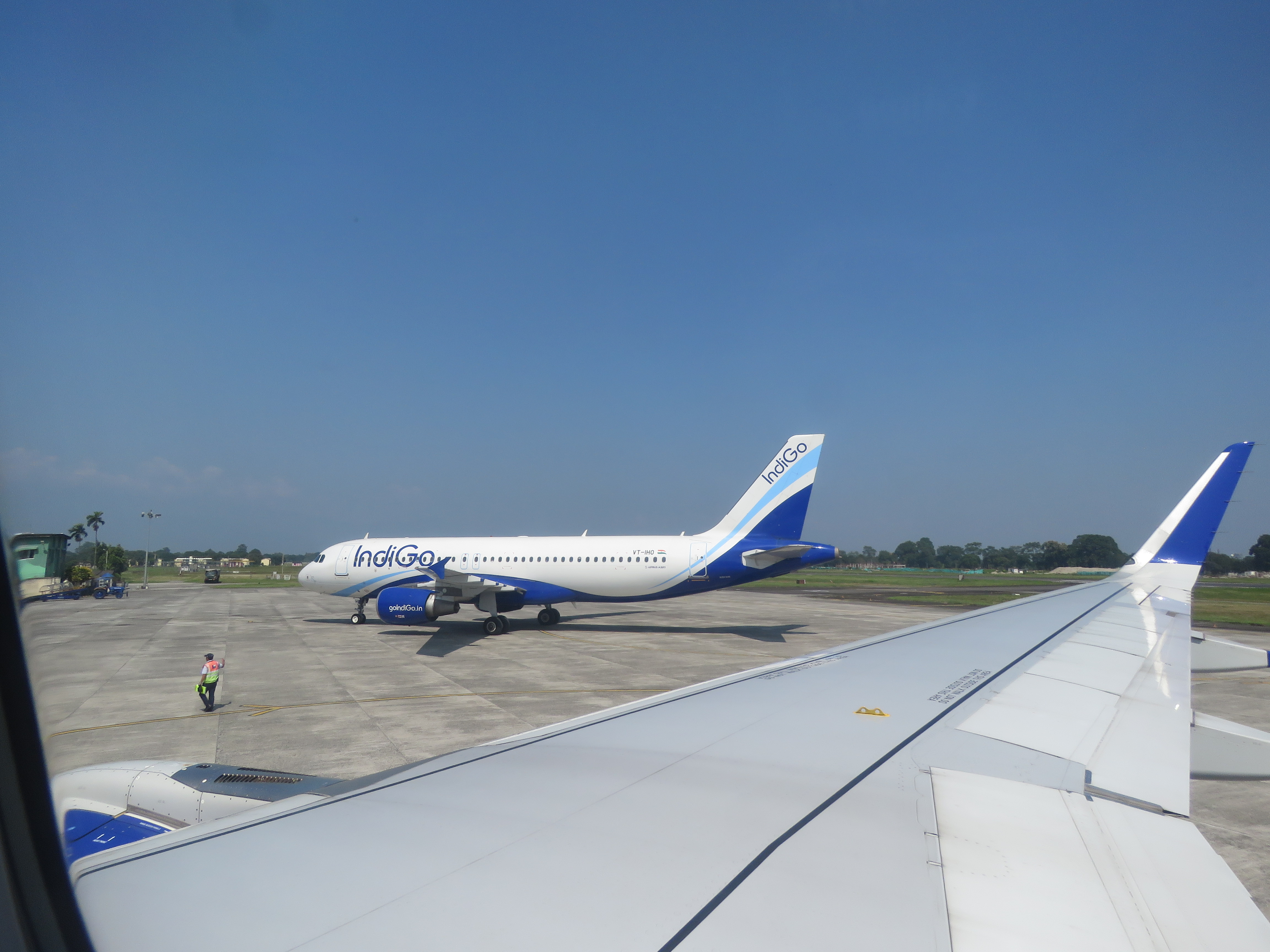
Apron of the airport

Bagdogra Airport (IATA: IXB, ICAO: VEBD) (Note: Bengali pronunciation: [bagɖogra bimanbɔndor]) is a customs airport serving the city of Siliguri in West Bengal, India. It is located in Bagdogra, 12 km (7.5 mi) south-west from the city centre. It is operated as a civil enclave at the Bagdogra Air Force Station of the Indian Air Force. It is the gateway to the hill stations of Darjeeling, Gangtok, Kurseong, Kalimpong, Mirik and other parts of North Bengal region. Siliguri, being a major transport and economic hub, the airport sees thousands of travellers and tourists annually. The Government of India conferred limited international airport status to the airport in 2002 with limited international operations to Bangkok–Suvarnabhumi and Paro. It is the second-busiest airport in the state after Kolkata.

The airport experiences humid subtropical climate (Köppen Climate Classification code: Cwa) - hot humid summers and cool winters. There is significant precipitation in all seasons, but remains drier in winters. Air traffic at Bagdogra crossed 1 million for the first time, growing at 43.6% per cent in 2014–15. In 2019–20, the airport served 3.2 million passengers, which was an increase of 11.2% from the previous year, making it the 17th-busiest airport in India.This airport has routes to 13 airports and serves 3 countries (India, Bhutan and Thailand). The most served route from this airport is to Indira Gandhi International Airport, Delhi.

== Air Force Station ==
The airbase is home to the IAF No. 20 Wing, as well to the Mikoyan-Gurevich MiG-21 (Mig-21) FL fighter aircraft of the No. 8 Squadron and a Helicopter Unit. Along with the airbase at Hasimara, Alipurduar district; it is responsible for combat air operations over a large area including Northern West Bengal, Sikkim and if needed, Bhutan. The base caters to all military air traffic for the Indian Army's XXXIII Corps based nearby in Sukna.

== Expansion ==
The Government of West Bengal had handed over 14.5 acres (5.9 ha) of land to the Ministry of Civil Aviation for developing infrastructure for night landing in 2010. AAI also expanded the apron at the same time, enabling the parking of 5 narrow-body aircraft simultaneously. The IAF, which maintains the ATC and runway, permitted night landings by civilian aircraft allowing flights past 6 PM in 2013.

For its growing traffic over the years, in 2022, From 11 to 25 April, the airport was shut down for 14 days to refurbish its sole runway.

The new terminal building, which started its construction in Q4 2024, is expected to be completed by March 2027 with 16 parking bays, 10 aerobridges and a parallel taxiway to the runway. It will have a floor area of 1 lakh sq.m. at a cost of ₹ 3,000 crore and capable of handling 12.5 million passengers annually. CP Kukreja Architects did the design work of the new terminal building as the Architectural & Engineering Consultant, the construction bid going to Kalpataru Projects International Ltd. After the expansion of the airport, more international flights can land here, and will turn this customs airport into an international one.

== Airlines and destinations ==
Airlines	Destinations
Air India Express	Bengaluru, Chennai, Delhi, Dibrugarh, Hyderabad, Imphal, Kolkata, Mumbai, Pune
Akasa Air	Ahmedabad, Bengaluru, Delhi, Dibrugarh, Guwahati, Mumbai
Drukair	Bangkok–Suvarnabhumi, Paro
IndiGo	Bengaluru, Chennai, Delhi, Hyderabad, Kolkata, Mumbai
SpiceJet	Bengaluru, Delhi, Kolkata, Mumbai

== Accidents and incidents ==
- 23 May 2008: A MiG-21 of the Indian Air Force had to perform a belly landing due to a technical snag and a jammed landing gear. The aircraft hard landed on the runway causing it to catch fire. The pilot ejected safely. The aircraft was written off subsequently.
- 5 July 2013: AI879, an A320 arriving from New Delhi swerved off the taxiway while taxiing towards the apron after landing. No injuries were reported. The passengers were immediately de-boarded. The aircraft sustained minor damage and took about 7 hours to bring the stuck aircraft to the taxiway.
- 11 July 2014: A mishap was avoided between IndiGo flight 6E472 and Air India flight AI879. Both aircraft received a Traffic Collision Avoidance System warning. Following the Resolution Advisory given by the TCAS the IndiGo flight immediately descended and the Air India flight turned right. Both aircraft landed safely without any injuries.
- 15 February 2019: An Air Asia India A320 scheduled for a flight from Bagdogra Airport to Kempegowda International Airport damaged its left wing sharklets while backtracking the runway. The two pilots were later suspended for 6 months by the DGCA in view of violating laid down procedures.
- 16 December 2019: An IndiGo A320neo bound for Kolkata performed an emergency landing in view of engine related issues. The aircraft was using Pratt & Whitney engines. Out of the two engines, one engine was not modified which caused the issue.
- 7 March 2025: An Antonov An-32 of the Indian Air Force crashed on landing at Bagdogra Airport. Although the aircraft was destroyed there were no fatalities.
