= Maharaja Bir Bikram Airport =

International airport serving Agartala, Tripura, India

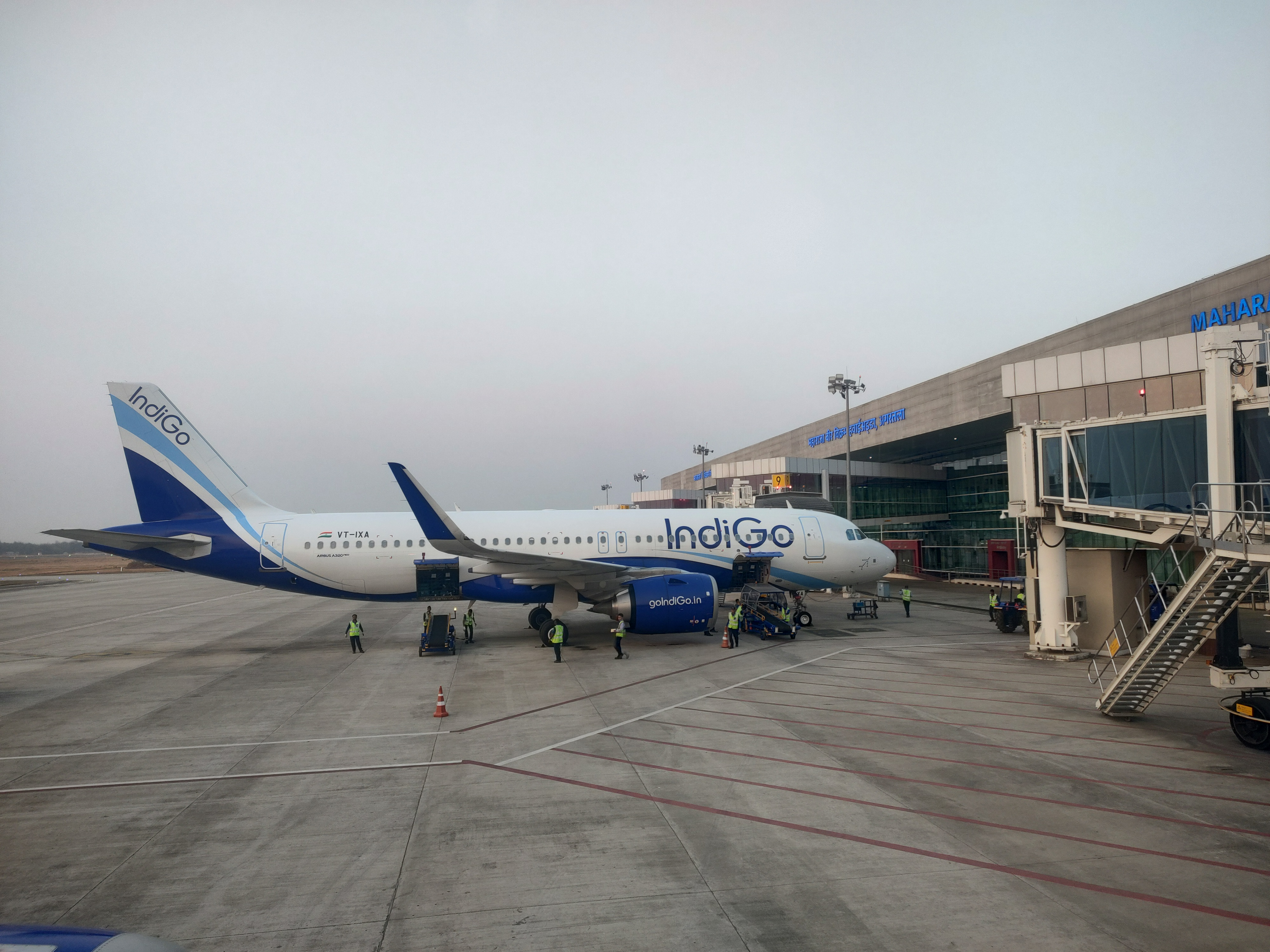
- IATA: IXA; ICAO: VEAT

Summary
- Airport type: Public
- Owner/Operator: Airports Authority of India
- Serves: Agartala
- Location: Singerbhil, Agartala, Tripura, India
- Opened: 1942; 84 years ago
- Elevation AMSL: 14 m (46 ft)
- Coordinates: 23°53′24″N 091°14′32″E
- Website: Agartala Airport

Map
- Location of airport in Tripura IXA (India)

Runways
Direction	Length		Surface
Direction	m	ft	Surface
18/36	2,286	7,500	Asphalt

Statistics (April 2025 - March 2026)
- Passengers: 15,38,175 (▲9%)
- Aircraft movements: 11,249 (▲13.1%)
- Cargo tonnage: 5,796.5 (▲5.6%)
- Source: AAI

Maharaja Bir Bikram Airport (IATA: IXA, ICAO: VEAT); (Bengali pronunciation: [Mɔharad͡ʒa bir bikrɔm bimanbɔndor]), also known as Agartala Airport, is an international airport situated 12 kilometres (7 miles) northwest of Agartala, the capital of Tripura. It is administered by the Airports Authority of India (AAI). It is the second busiest airport in North-East India after Lokpriya Gopinath Bordoloi Airport in Guwahati and 29th busiest airport in India. It is the third international airport in North-East India, after Lokpriya Gopinath Bordoloi Airport and Imphal Airport.

The current integrated terminal of the airport has 20 check-in counters, six parking bays, four aerobridges, conveyor belts and passenger-friendly modern facilities and amenities like In-Line Baggage System (ILBS), Escalators, Lifts, etc. In addition to the new terminal building, a new parallel taxiway to the runway and two new hangars are being built. Another terminal, along with the runway, will be built as an extension of the airport across the border with Bangladesh. This new terminal will serve Bangladeshis accessing the airport without having to enter Indian territory. This arrangement is worked out as similar to the Cross Border Xpress terminal of Tijuana International Airport in Mexico, which is located along the United States–Mexico border.

== History ==
The airport was designed and built in 1942 by the then Maharaja of Tripura, Bir Bikram Kishore Manikya Bahadur Debbarman. It had one primary runway, 05/23, which is now used as a taxiway to Runway 18/36.

During World War II, the airport was used by the RAF nos.31 and 194 Squadrons in February/March 1943 as a supply base for the Chindit operations behind enemy lines in Burma. These Squadrons returned in February 1944 to provide support to the second Chindit operation. Later the 4th Combat Cargo Group (4th CCG) of the United States Army Air Forces Tenth Air Force, flying Curtiss C-46 Commando transport aircraft over Burma. The 4th CCG operated from the airport during December 1944 and January 1945, after which it moved to Chittagong.

The airport experienced international operations when Indian Airlines flew to Dhaka-Tejgaon Airport and Jessore in East Pakistan/Bangladesh from Agartala.

=== Development and expansion ===
Airports Authority of India (AAI) decided to upgrade the airport to international standards, which will be the third international airport in North-East region after Imphal. The AAI has undertaken ₹438 crore (US$61 million) project to upgrade the airport to provide world-class facilities. The State Government has already provided 72 acres (29 ha) land to AAI to build a new terminal building, runway and other necessary infrastructure. The upgrade is expected to be completed by 2025, out of which the new terminal is completed, and it was inaugurated by Prime Minister Narendra Modi on 4 January 2022. After becoming operational, flights from Agartala to Chittagong and likely to Singapore will be operated.

=== Proposal of Bangladesh expansion ===
The Indian government has suggested leasing some land from Bangladesh in order to install perimeter fences and landing lights. The airport is often used by Bangladeshi travellers and if further utilised by Bangladesh, may be able to help relieve the heavy passenger and cargo traffic at Dhaka Airport. The Bangladeshi government is considering the matter; Bangladeshi FM Shahidul Haque compared the proposal to that of Geneva Airport, which is accessible from Switzerland and France. Ministers within Bangladesh's ruling Awami League suggested the only way such a proposal would be politically acceptable to Bangladesh is if a joint venture was proposed.

== Airlines and destinations ==
Airlines	Destinations
Air India Express	Kolkata, Siliguri
Akasa Air	Bengaluru, Guwahati
IndiGo	Bengaluru, Delhi, Dibrugarh, Guwahati, Imphal, Kolkata, Silchar

== Accidents and incidents ==
- 7 June 1970: A Fokker F27 of Indian Airlines flying with 34 passengers and 4 crew members overran the runway at Agartala after it touched down at a higher than normal speed 2,775 feet from the threshold; however, none of the passengers or crew members died. The aeroplane was later written off.

== See also ==
- Airports in India
- List of busiest airports in India by passenger traffic
