= Lokpriya Gopinath Bordoloi International Airport =

Airport serving Guwahati, Assam, India

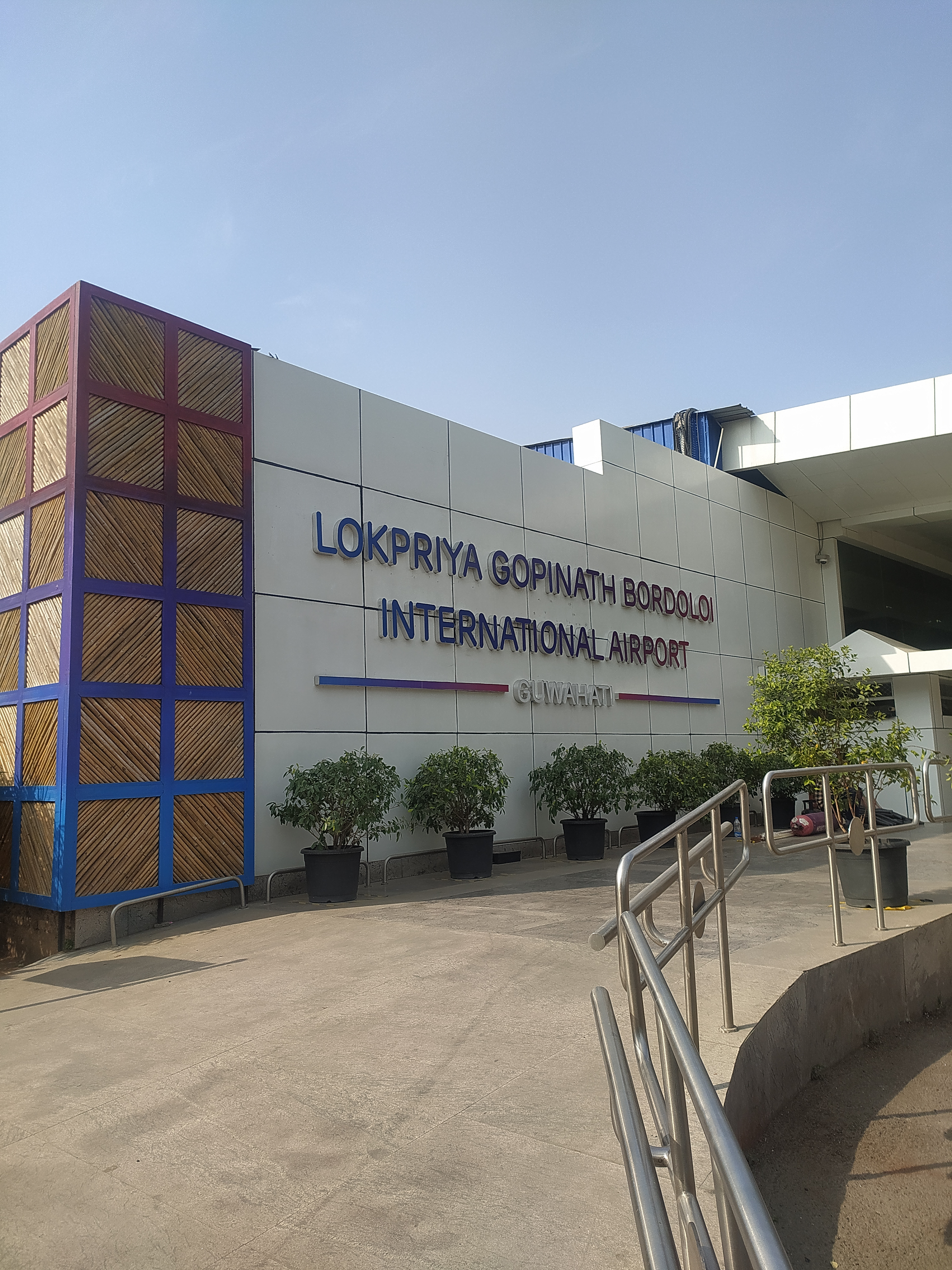
- IATA: GAU; ICAO: VEGT; WMO: 42410

Summary
- Airport type: Public/Military
- Owner: Airports Authority of India
- Operator: Guwahati International Airport Limited
- Serves: Guwahati, Dispur
- Location: Borjhar, Guwahati, Assam, India
- Opened: 1958; 68 years ago
- Focus city for: Alliance Air; IndiGo
- Elevation AMSL: 163 ft (50 m)
- Coordinates: 26°06′22″N 091°35′09″E
- Website: Lokpriya Gopinath Bordoloi International Airport

Map
- Location of airport in Assam GAU (India)

Runways
Direction	Length		Surface
Direction	m	ft	Surface
02/20	3,103	10,180	Asphalt

Statistics (April 2025 – March 2026)
- Passengers: 6,622,784 (▲7.5%)
- Aircraft movements: 47,439 (▲3.2%)
- Cargo tonnage: 30,164 (▲13.4%)
- Source: AAI

Lokpriya Gopinath Bordoloi International Airport (IATA: GAU, ICAO: VEGT), or Guwahati Airport, is an international airport serving the largest city of Assam and the capital of the state within it, Guwahati and Dispur, in India. It is the primary airport of Northeast India. It is located at Borjhar, 26 km (16 mi) from Dispur and 28 km (18 mi) from Guwahati. It is named after Gopinath Bordoloi, an independence activist and the first Chief Minister of Assam after India's independence. The airport is managed by the Airports Authority of India and also serves as an Indian Air Force base.

== History ==
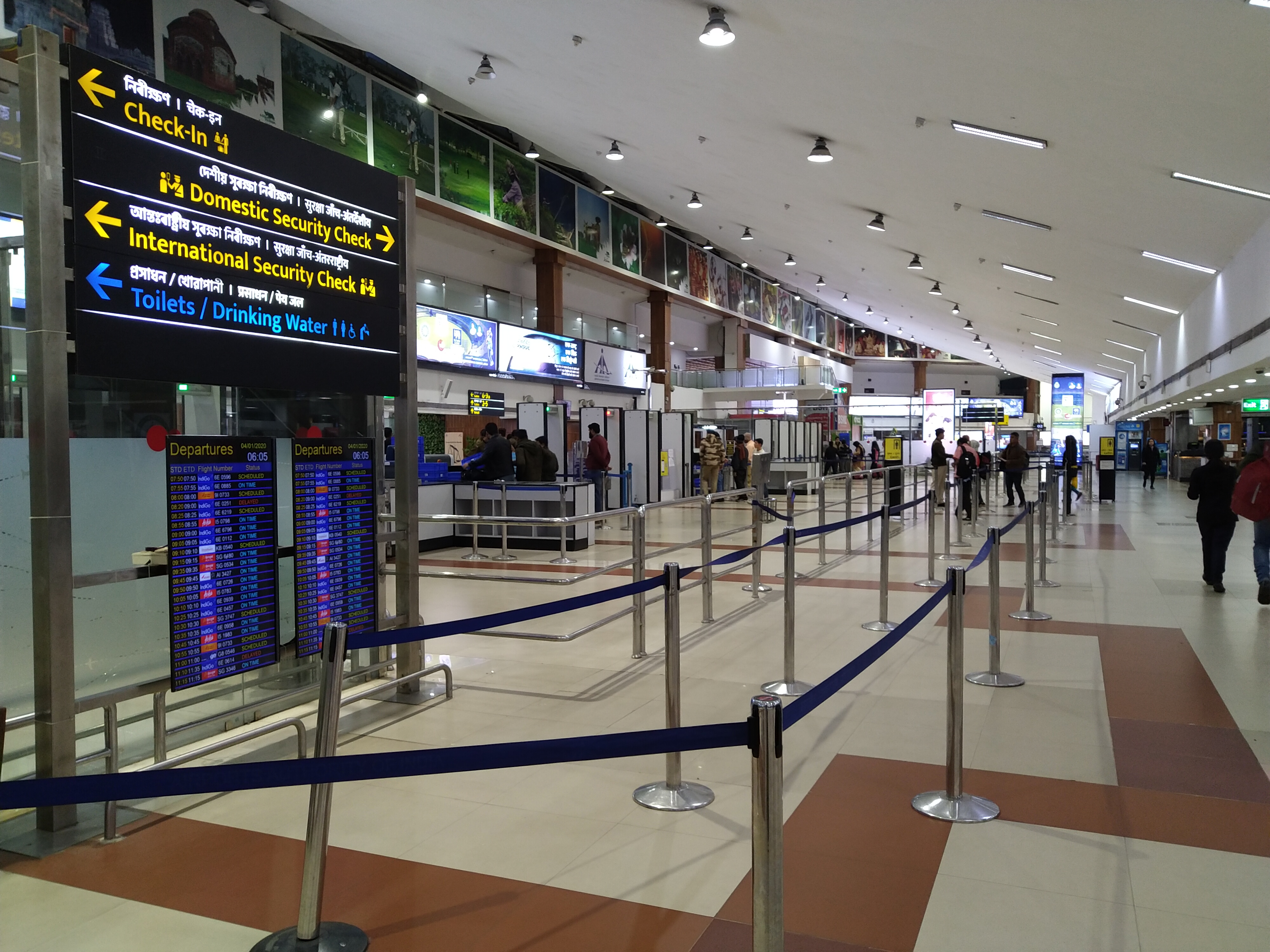
Domestic security check area of the airport

Boarding gates of the airport

The airport has undergone numerous expansions and renovations since its establishment in 1958, to facilitate socio-economic development, growth, connectivity and tourism in the state as well as in North-East India, as a gateway to the region. It handled more than 3.7 million passengers in 2017, an increase of 36% from 2016. The airport witnessed annual traffic of over 23% in 2018–19, with a total footfall of 5.7 million passengers and 55,066 aircraft movements in the same period. In 2023, the airport operated on its highest capacity in terms of passengers and aircraft movements ever since its establishment. It handled more than 5.6 million passengers and 46,600 aircraft till 31 December 2023, with an updated figure due in April 2024, thus almost touching its peak capacity of 6 million passengers per annum.

Lokapriya Gopinath Bardoloi International Airport, Guwahati, recorded significant growth in passenger traffic during 2025, driven by increases in both domestic and international travel. The airport handled a total of approximately 7.01 million passengers during the year.

Domestic traffic accounted for the majority of passengers, with about 3.5 million domestic arrivals and 3.4 million domestic departures. International operations included 45,423 arriving passengers and 45,474 departing passengers, reflecting steady growth in overseas connectivity.

Passenger traffic at Lokapriya Gopinath Bardoloi International Airport (2025)
Category	Passengers
Domestic arrivals	3,500,000
Domestic departures	3,400,000
International arrivals	45,423
International departures	45,474
Total passengers	7,010,000

In 2002, the first international flight operated by Air India from the airport to Bangkok, using an Airbus A310 aircraft, thus becoming the first international airport in the North-East region. However, the flight was withdrawn due to poor passenger load. In January 2019, the airport won bids for two international destinations under the government's UDAN Scheme, with destinations most anticipated being Dhaka and Bangkok–Don Mueang. In November 2021, the airport won more bids, this time for six international destinations under the UDAN Scheme – Dhaka, Bangkok–Don Mueang, Kuala Lumpur, Singapore and Yangon.

In February 2019, the airport was given on lease for 50 years' ownership to Adani Group, at the highest bid of ₹ 160 per passenger.

As of February 2024, international flights in the airport are operated by Drukair from Paro to Singapore, as a connecting flight, and by Thai AirAsia to Bangkok–Don Mueang.

To relieve the existing terminal from rising traffic and demand, construction on a new terminal building began in March 2018, it was initially planned to be completed by July 2024. On 20 December 2025, Prime Minister Narendra Modi inaugurated the new integrated terminal building at the Lokpriya Gopinath Bordoloi International Airport in Guwahati, Assam. Constructed at a cost of approximately ₹4,000 crore, the terminal has an annual passenger handling capacity of 13.1 million and became the largest airport terminal in Northeast India upon inauguration. Spread across 140,000 square metres, the terminal is designed around the theme "Bamboo Orchids", incorporating architectural elements inspired by Assam’s biodiversity and cultural heritage, including locally sourced bamboo, Japi motifs and rhino-inspired designs.

== Structure ==
=== Runway ===
The airport has a 3,103 m (10,180 ft)-long and 45 m (148 ft)-wide runway, oriented 02/20, capable of handling widebody aircraft like the Boeing 787, and is equipped with CAT-III Instrument Landing System (ILS), Döppler Very High Frequency (DVOR)/Distance Measuring Equipment (DME) and PAPI lights facilities to allow flight operations to take place at night and during unfavourable weather conditions, like rain and fog. The airport has two aprons–one in front of the main passenger terminal and another in front of the under-construction second passenger terminal, together capable for parking of 25 narrowbody aircraft like the Airbus A321 and Boeing 737.

== Terminals ==
=== Terminal 1 ===
Terminal 1 was the passenger terminal from 1958 to 2026. It covered an area of 28,685 m^{2} (308,760 sq ft), and was divided into two parts for domestic and international passengers. It had three levels: the ground floor for arrivals, the mezzanine floor for boarding and the third floor for departures. It had four aerobridges, and was capable of serving 20,000 passengers during peak hours and 6 million passengers annually. In front of its entrance, there was a large parking space for vehicles. To its north, there is a cargo terminal along with storage areas, and to its south, there is an air traffic control (ATC) tower, fire station, fuel station and technical block. Following the inauguration of the new Terminal 2, the old terminal is currently being repurposed as a dedicated cargo hub to facilitate the expansion of cargo networks.

=== Terminal 2 ===
Terminal 2 is designed by internationally acclaimed Indian architect Nuru Karim. The terminal’s architecture draws inspiration from Assam’s Kopou phool (foxtail orchid) and incorporates more than 140 metric tonnes of bamboo. Its design further integrates elements of Assam’s traditional bholuka bamboo craftsmanship along with bamboo construction techniques associated with the Apatani tribe of Arunachal Pradesh, reflecting the cultural heritage and architectural traditions of Northeast India. The design received the International Architecture Award 2025 for integrating regional identity with contemporary infrastructure.

The new terminal is equipped with modern passenger infrastructure, including 10 aerobridges, 16 self-baggage drop counters, enhanced security systems, and expanded retail as well as dining facilities. The terminal stands can also support much larger aircraft such as the Boeing 777 and Airbus A340.

== Facilities ==
The airport offers a specialised service that offers customised packages and an array of services to meet travellers' requirements, including professional assistance to corporate clients and support to group travellers, senior citizens and solo travellers.

Other facilities include in-line baggage handling systems, conveyor belts, booking counters, immigration and emigration counters, check-in kiosks, CCTVs, washrooms, restaurants, lounges, multiple retail stores and souvenir shops, lost and found service, free WiFi, child care facilities, cargo services, medical facilities, facilities for physically challenged passengers, duty-free, porter service, foreign exchange counters and tourist information desks.

== Features ==
The airport has adopted various measures such as a solid waste management system, a wastewater treatment facility, a rainwater harvesting facility, a solar power plant to the south of the terminal for generating electricity, green spaces and an underground drainage system. The upcoming Terminal 2 will also have the same features with more developed systems.

== Expansion ==
To meet the growing demands and rising traffic in the future, the Airports Authority of India (AAI) has undertaken construction of a second passenger terminal in the northern side of the airport, at a cost of ₹1,232 crore (US$130 million).

The new terminal building will be capable of handling 4,300 domestic and 200 international passengers during peak hours, and about 10 million passengers annually. It will be equipped with 64 check-in counters, 20 self-check-in kiosks, 10 escalators, six elevators, six baggage claim counters, 16 self-baggage drop counters, in-line baggage security screening systems, ten aerobridges, multiple retail stores, souvenir shops and passenger-friendly facilities and amenities.

The foundation stone for the new terminal was laid by the then Minister of Civil Aviation, Ashok Gajapathi Raju, and Chief Minister Sarbananda Sonowal in January 2018, and construction began in March 2018. It was scheduled to be ready by June 2021. However, due to the COVID-19 pandemic, which caused several delays in work due to lack of labour and restrictions, it was rescheduled to June 2022. The estimated completion date was again changed to be the end of 2023. As of February 2024, more than halfway of the work had been completed, and the date for completion and opening was set to July 2024. As of February 2025, all works have been completed, with just the finishing touches being given. Meanwhile, the existing terminal has been optimised to cater to the rising traffic and demand, by increasing the total area to 1,000 m^{2} (11,000 sq ft), a significant increase from its previous size of just 270 m^{2} (2,900 sq ft). The new terminal is scheduled to be opened either by April or May 2025, at the earliest. In March 2025, Chief Minister Himanta Biswa Sarma stated that the new terminal would be operational by late 2025. On 20 December 2025, Prime Minister Narendra Modi inaugurated the new integrated terminal building at the Lokpriya Gopinath Bordoloi International Airport in Guwahati, Assam.

== Airlines and destinations ==
Airlines	Destinations
Air India Express	Abu Dhabi, Bengaluru, Chennai, Delhi, Dibrugarh, Dimapur, Dubai–International, Hyderabad, Imphal, Jaipur, Kolkata
Alliance Air	Dibrugarh, Pasighat
Air India	Delhi
IndiGo	Ahmedabad, Aizawl, Deoghar, Agartala, Bangkok–Suvarnabhumi, Bengaluru, Bhubaneswar, Chennai, Delhi, Dimapur, Hyderabad, Itanagar, Imphal, Jaipur, Kolkata, Mumbai, Pune
Spicejet	Ahmedabad, Delhi, Srinagar
Thai AirAsia	Bangkok–Don Mueang
Akasa Air	Agartala, Bagdogra, Bengaluru, Mumbai
Drukair	Paro, Bangkok, Singapore

== Statistics ==
Passenger traffic at Lokpriya Gopinath Bordoloi International Airport (2025–2026)
Month	2025	2026	Change (%)
January	556,130	590,544	+6.2%
February	527,894	534,715	+1.3%
March	588,484	548,775	−6.7%
April	577,167	532,557	−7.7%
May	574,221	279,683	−51.3%
June	546,059	530,031	−2.9%
July	538,024	514,444	−4.4%
August	732,366	463,935	−36.7%
January–August total	4,640,345	3,994,684	−13.9%

== See also ==
- Airports in India
- List of busiest airports in India by passenger traffic
