= List of regional airlines =

The following is a list of regional airlines organized by home country.

== Africa ==
Algeria

- Domestic Airlines

Democratic Republic of the Congo

- Compagnie Africaine d'Aviation

Morocco

- Royal Air Maroc Express

Mozambique

- LAM Mozambique Airlines

Kenya

- Kenya Airways

Nigeria

- Arik Air

Tanzania

- Air Excel
- Coastal Aviation

South Africa

- Airlink
- CemAir
- FlySafair
- LIFT Airline

Zimbabwe

- Air Zimbabwe

== Americas ==
Brazil

- Azul Conecta
- MAP Linhas Aéreas
- Voepass Linhas Aéreas

Canada

- Air Canada Express
- Air Inuit
- Bearskin Airlines
- Canadian North
- Central Mountain Air
- Helijet
- Jazz
- Pacific Coastal Airlines
- PAL Airlines
- Pascan
- Perimeter Aviation
- Porter Airlines
- Starlink
- Wasaya Airways
- WestJet Encore

Chile

- Aerocardal
- Aerovías DAP
- JetSmart
- LATAM Express
- Sky Airline

Colombia

- Avianca Express
- Clic Air
- SATENA

Costa Rica

- Costa Rica Green Airways
- Sansa Airlines

Curaçao

- Divi Divi Air

Greenland

- Air Greenland

Guatemala

- Avianca Guatemala

Guyana

- Roraima Airways

Haiti

- Sunrise Airways

Mexico

- Aéreo Servicio Guerrero
- Aeroméxico Connect
- Avioquintana
- Calafia Airlines

Nicaragua

- La Costeña

Panama

- Air Panama

Suriname

- Fly All Ways

United States

- Air Wisconsin
- American Eagle
- Bering Air
- Boutique Air
- Cape Air
- CommuteAir
- Contour Airlines
- Delta Connection
- Endeavor Air
- Envoy Air
- GoJet Airlines
- Horizon Air
- Kenmore Air
- Mesa Airlines
- Mokulele Airlines
- Nantucket Airlines
- New England Airlines
- Piedmont Airlines
- PSA Airlines
- Reliant Air
- Republic Airways
- SkyWest Airlines
- United Express

Venezuela

- LASER Airlines

== Asia ==
Cambodia

- Cambodia Airways

China (mainland)

- China Express Airlines
- China Flying Dragon Aviation
- Colorful Guizhou Airlines
- Joy Air

Hong Kong

- Hong Kong Airlines

India

- Alliance Air
- Al Hind Air
- FlyBig
- FlyExpress
- Star Air
- Zooom Air
- IndiaOne Air
- Shankh Air
- Air Kerala
- JettWings Airways

Indonesia

- Jhonlin Air Transport
- NAM Air
- Pelita Air
- Susi Air
- TransNusa
- Trigana Air
- Wings Air

Iraq

- Fly Baghdad

Japan

- ANA Wings
- Amakusa Airlines
- Air Do
- Fuji Dream Airlines
- Hokkaido Air System
- J-Air
- Japan Air Commuter
- Oriental Air Bridge
- Ryukyu Air Commuter
- Solaseed Air

Kazakhstan

- Qazaq Air

Laos

- Lao Skyway

Kuwait

- Jazeera Airways

Myanmar

- Air Thanlwin
- Mann Yadanarpon Airlines
- Mingalar Aviation Services

Malaysia

- AirBorneo
- Firefly

Nepal

- Himalaya Airlines
- Tara Air

Pakistan

- South Air

Philippines

- Air Juan
- AirSWIFT
- Bangsamoro Airways
- Cebgo
- Leading Edge Air Services, Corp. (LEASCOR)
- PAL Express
- SkyJet Airlines
- Sky Pasada
- Sunlight Air

South Korea

- SUM Air

Sri Lanka

- FitsAir

Taiwan

- Daily Air
- Mandarin Airlines
- Uni Air

Thailand

- Bangkok Airways

Uzbekistan

- Silk Avia

Vietnam

- VASCO

== Europe ==
Austria

- People's

Denmark

- DAT
- Sun-Air of Scandinavia

Finland

- Nordic Regional Airlines

France

- Air France Hop
- Chalair
- Twin Jet

Germany

- Lufthansa City Airlines
- Lufthansa Regional
- Sylt Air

Greece

- Olympic Air
- Sky Express

Hungary

- Aeroexpress Regional

Iceland

- Eagle Air
- Norlandair

Ireland

- Aer Lingus Regional
- CityJet

Italy

- Air Dolomiti

Netherlands

- AIS Airlines
- KLM Cityhopper

Norway

- Helitrans
- Widerøe

Malta

- Air Malta

Poland

- SprintAir

Portugal

- Portugália Airlines
- SATA Air Açores
- TAP Express

Romania

- Carpatair

Russia

- AeroBratsk
- Aurora
- Polar Airlines
- RusLine
- Severstal Air Company
- Vostok Aviation Company

Spain

- Air Nostrum
- Binter Canarias

Sweden

- Braathens Regional Airlines
- Braathens Regional Airways

Switzerland

- Helvetic Airways

United Kingdom

- Aurigny
- BA CityFlyer
- Hebridean Air Services
- Isles of Scilly Skybus
- Loganair
- LyddAir

== Oceania ==
Australia

- Airnorth
- FlyPelican
- King Island Airlines
- Link Airways
- Nexus Airlines
- QantasLink
- Rex Airlines
- Sharp Airlines
- Skippers Aviation
- Skytrans Airlines
- Virgin Australia Regional Airlines

French Polynesia

- Air Tahiti

New Zealand

- Air New Zealand Link
- Golden Bay Air
- Sounds Air
- Sunair

== Defunct regional airlines ==
=== Africa ===
Egypt

- Egyptair Express

South Africa

- South African Express

=== Asia ===
Bangladesh

- Regent Airways

Cambodia

- Siem Reap Airways International

Hong Kong

- Cathay Dragon

India

- Air Costa
- Air Pegasus
- MDLR Airlines
- Trujet

Indonesia

- Adam Air
- Awair
- Bali Air
- Batavia Air
- Bayu Indonesia
- Bouraq Indonesia Airlines
- Indonesian Airlines
- Jatayu Airlines
- Mandala Airlines
- Merpati Nusantara Airlines
- Riau Airlines
- Sempati Air
- Star Air
- Top Air
- Xpress Air

Kazakhstan

- Bek Air

Malaysia

- FlyAsianXpress
- SKS Airways

Pakistan

- Air Indus

Saudi Arabia

- SaudiGulf Airlines

Singapore

- SilkAir

Thailand

- Thai Smile

Taiwan

- Far Eastern Air Transport
- TransAsia Airways

Vietnam

- Air Mekong

=== Europe ===
Albania

- Ada Air

Austria

- Air Alps
- Fairline
- Robin Hood Aviation
- Tyrolean Airways
- Welcome Air

Azerbaijan

- AZALJet

Belgium

- Delta Air Transport
- VLM Airlines

Bosnia and Herzegovina

- Air Srpska

Denmark

- Cimber Sterling

Estonia

- Aero Airlines
- Air Livonia
- Avies

Finland

- Air100
- Blue1
- Finncomm
- Fly Lappeenranta
- Turku Air

France

- Air Alpes
- Air Turquoise
- Airlinair
- Brit Air
- Champagne Airlines
- Proteus Airlines
- Régional

Germany

- Air Bremen
- Augsburg Airways
- Cirrus Airlines
- City-Air
- Contact Air
- Dauair
- European Air Express
- German Airways
- Lufthansa CityLine
- OLT Express Germany

Greece

- Astra Airlines

Hungary

- Malév Express

Iceland

- Landsflug

Ireland

- Euroceltic Airways
- Stobart Air

Italy

- Alitalia CityLiner
- FlyOristano
- Gandalf Airlines

Lithuania

- Air Lithuania

Netherlands

- NetherLines
- NLM CityHopper

Norway

- Air Norway
- Bergen Air Transport
- Coast Air
- Kato Airline
- SAS Commuter
- Vildanden

Portugal

- Eurolot
- Direct Fly
- OLT Express

Romania

- Angel Airlines

Russia

- Bural
- Pskovavia
- Tatarstan Airlines
- Tuva Airlines

Slovakia

- Danube Wings
- Slovak Airlines

Slovenia

- Adria Airways

Spain

- Ándalus Líneas Aéreas
- Binter Mediterraneo
- LagunAir
- Navegacion y Servicios Aéreos Canarios

Sweden

- Barents AirLink
- Direktflyg
- Höga Kusten Flyg
- Kullaflyg
- Nextjet
- Skyways Express
- Sparrow Aviation
- Sundsvallsflyg
- Sverigeflyg
- Swedline Express

Switzerland

- Crossair
- Crossair Europe
- Darwin Airline
- Helvetic Wings
- SkyWork Airlines
- Swiss European Air Lines

Turkey

- Borajet
- IZair

Ukraine

- Air Onix
- DART Ukrainian Airlines

United Kingdom

- Air Southwest
- Air Wales
- AirUK
- Alpha One Airways
- BA Connect
- Blue Islands
- BMI Regional
- British NorthWest Airlines
- Brymon Airways
- Capital Airlines
- CityFlyer Express
- Eastern Airways
- EuroManx
- Flybe (1979–2020)
- Flybe (2022–2023)
- Flykeen Airways
- FlyWhoosh
- Gill Airways
- Jetstream Express
- London City Airways
- Manx Airlines
- Skysouth

=== Americas ===
Argentina

- Austral Líneas Aéreas

Brazil

- Brava Linhas Aéreas
- Litorânea
- Nordeste Linhas Aéreas Regionais
- Pantanal Linhas Aéreas
- Rico Linhas Aéreas
- Rio Sul Serviços Aéreos Regionais
- SETE Linhas Aéreas

Canada

- Air Baffin
- Air BC
- Air Labrador
- Air Nova
- Air Ontario
- Air Satellite
- Airspeed Aviation
- Alberta Citylink
- Austin Airways
- Baxter Aviation
- BCWest Air
- Canadian Regional Airlines
- City Express
- Corporate Express
- Hawkair
- NAC Air
- NorOntair
- Ontario Express
- Peace Air
- Prince Edward Air
- Quebecair Express
- Sonicblue Airways
- Triton Airlines

Ecuador

- Vuelos Internos Privados

Honduras

- Avianca Honduras

Martinique

- Air Martinique

Mexico

- Aero Sudpacífico
- Aeromar
- MexicanaClick
- MexicanaLink

Montserrat

- Air Montserrat

Netherlands Antilles

- Bonaire Express
- Curaçao Express

Panama

- Alas Chiricanas

Peru

- Expreso Aéreo

United States

- Air Vegas
- America West Express
- AmericanConnection
- Chautauqua Airlines
- Colgan Air
- Comair
- Compass Airlines
- Continental Connection
- Continental Express
- Chicago Express Airlines
- Executive Airlines
- Freedom Airlines
- Go!
- Great Lakes Airlines
- Island Air
- Lynx Aviation
- Mesaba Airlines
- Midwest Connect
- Mountain Air Express
- Northwest Airlink
- Ohana by Hawaiian
- Pan Am Express
- PenAir
- Ravn Alaska
- Silver Airways
- Streamline Air
- Trans World Express
- US Airways Express
- ViaAir

Venezuela

- Aero Ejecutivos
- Avior Regional
- Línea Turística Aereotuy

=== Oceania ===
Australia

- Airlines of New South Wales
- Compass Airlines
- East-West Airlines
- Tasair

New Zealand

- Air Nelson
- Air2there
- Eagle Airways
- Mount Cook Airline
- Origin Pacific Airways
- Vincent Aviation

== See also ==
- List of airlines
- List of low-cost airlines
- Flag carrier
