= List of airlines of India =

This is a list of airlines currently operating in India.

== Mainline ==
Airline		Image	IATA	ICAO	Callsign	Founded	Hubs/bases	Destinations	Fleet size	Orders	Notes
Air India Limited	Air India		AI	AIC	AIRINDIA	1932	Bengaluru, Delhi, Mumbai	85	187	371	Flag carrier
Air India Limited	Air India Express		IX	AXB	EXPRESS INDIA	2005	Bengaluru, Delhi, Mumbai	62	106	167	Low-cost subsidiary of Air India
Akasa Air			QP	AKJ	AKASA AIR	2021	Bengaluru, Mumbai	30	43	186	Low-cost carrier
IndiGo			6E	IGO	IFLY	2006	Bengaluru, Chennai, Delhi, Hyderabad, Kochi, Kolkata, Mumbai	140	422	921	Low-cost carrier
SpiceJet			SG	SEJ	SPICEJET	2004	Delhi, Hyderabad	63	54	129	Low-cost carrier

== Regional ==
Airline	Image	IATA	ICAO	Callsign	Founded	Hubs	Destinations	Fleet size	Orders	Notes
Alliance Air		9I	LLR	ALLIED	1996	Bengaluru, Chennai, Delhi, Hyderabad, Kolkata, Mumbai	72	21	1	Owned by the Government of India
Fly91		IC	GOA	GOAN	2022	Goa–Mopa	9	6	40	
IndiaOne Air		I7	IOA	INDIA FIRST	2020	Bhubaneswar	7	3	10	
Star Air		S5	SDG	HISTAR	2019	Bengaluru, Hyderabad	32	11	2	

== Cargo ==
Airline	Image	IATA	ICAO	Callsign	Founded	Hub(s)	Destinations	Fleet size	Orders	Notes
Afcom Holdings		MT			2013	Chennai	2	3	—	
Blue Dart Aviation		BZ	BDA	BLUE DART	1994	Chennai	8	8	—	
Pradhaan Air Express		6P	PRX	PRADHAAN	2021	Delhi	2	1	3	
Quikjet Airlines		QO	FQA	QUIK LIFT	2007	Bengaluru	2	2	—	

== Charter ==
Airline	Image	IATA	ICAO	Callsign	Founded	Hubs	Fleet size	Notes
Club One Air		—	—	—	2005	Delhi, Mumbai, Visakhapatnam	8	
Deccan Charters		DN	DKN	DECCAN	1997	Bengaluru	5	
Global Vectra Helicorp		—	—	—	1997	Mumbai	30	
Halo Airways					2019	Kochi	3	
India Fly Safe Aviation		—	—	—	2010	Delhi	4	
JetSetGo		—	—	—	2014	Delhi	12	
Karnavati Aviation					2007	Ahmedabad	10	
Pawan Hans		—	PHE	PAWAN HANS	1985	Delhi	42	
Pinnacle Air		—	—	—	2004	Delhi	8	
Sirius India Airlines					2024	Delhi	1	
TajAir		—	—	—	1993	Mumbai	1	
Ventura AirConnect		—	—	—	2011	Surat	5	
VSR Ventures		—	—	—	2009	Delhi	17	

== Planned ==
- Air Kerala
- Al Hind Air
- FlyExpress
- JettWings Airways
- Shankh Air

== See also ==
- List of airports in India
- List of airlines
- List of pilot training institutes in India
