= History of Kingfisher Airlines =

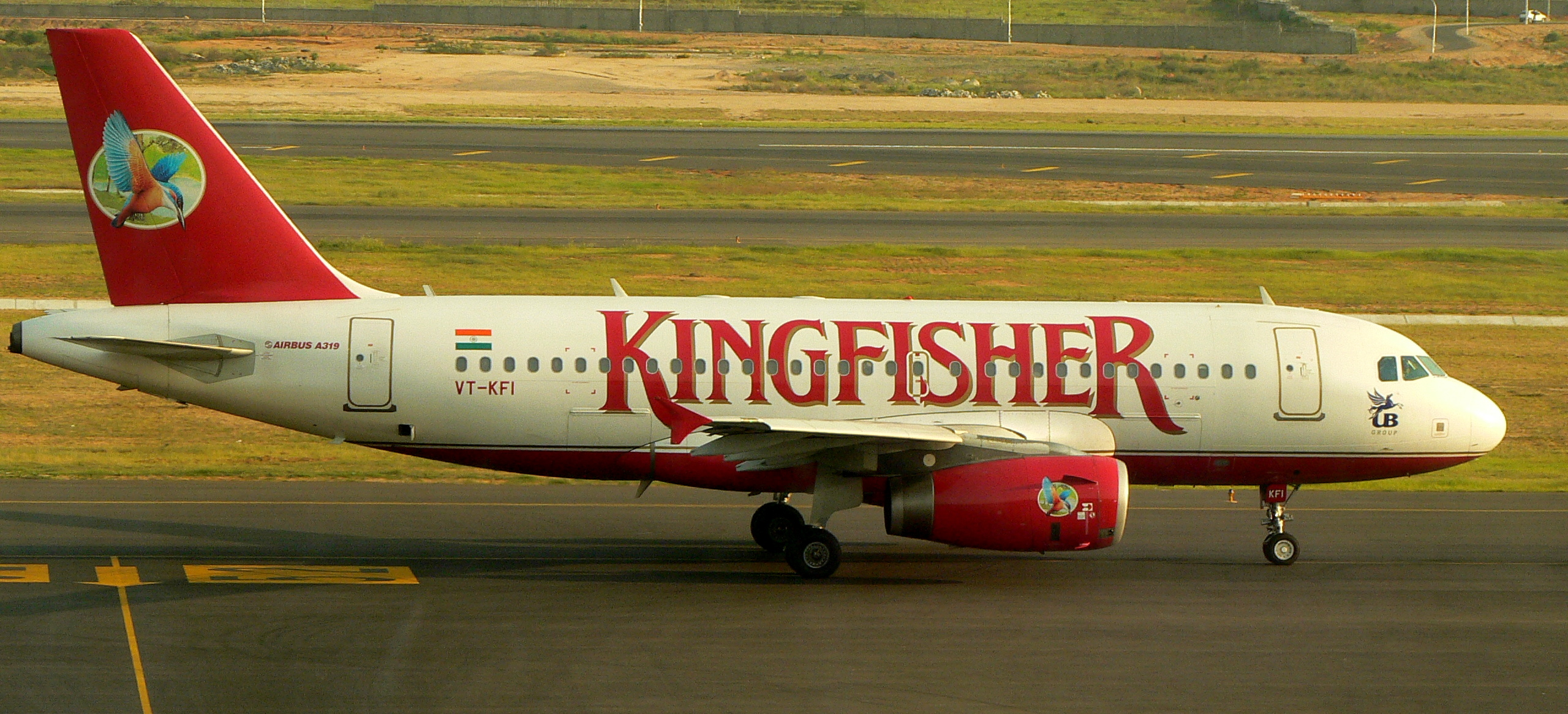
Airbus A319 on runway of Rajiv Gandhi International Airport, Hyderabad

Kingfisher Airlines was established in 2003 and ceased operations when its license was cancelled on 20 October 2012. It is owned by the Bengaluru based United Breweries Group. The airline started commercial operations on 9 May 2005 with a fleet of four new Airbus A320-200s operating a flight from Mumbai to Delhi. It started its international operations on 3 September 2008 by connecting Bengaluru with London. Kingfisher's head office is located in Kingfisher House Western Express Highway Vile Parle (E) Mumbai – 400099 India and its registered office is located in UB City, Bangalore. Its head office was previously in the Kingfisher House in Vile Parle (East), Mumbai. In 2012 Vijay Mallya was trying to sell the Vile Parle Kingfisher House. The airline had shut down its operations when on 20 October 2012 the DGCA suspended its flying license. This suspension had been due to failure to give an effective response to the show-cause notice issued by DGCA. However, The airline had locked out its employees for several days before this suspension. On 25 October 2012, the employees agreed to return to work. On 7 June 2010 Kingfisher became a member elect of the Oneworld airline alliance when it signed a formal membership agreement. Kingfisher confirmed on 20 December 2011 that it will join the Oneworld airline alliance on 10 February 2012. Kingfisher would have been the first Indian carrier to join one of the big airline alliances. However, on 3 February 2012, owing to bad financial situation and two days after the International Air Transport Association (IATA) clearing house suspended Kingfisher Airlines; the airlines participation to Oneworld has been put on hold.

== Financial unrest ==
The crisis started with the freezing of the bank accounts of the airline by the Indian Income Tax Department. Following are the year by year financial results of Kingfisher Airlines, all values are depicted in Indian rupee (INR) crore except EPS, which is in plain INR.

#	From	To	Months	Total Income	Cost	Net Profit	EPS
01	Apr-05	Jun-06	15	1,352	1,689	−337	−68
02	Jul-06	Jun-07	12	2,142	2,562	−420	−42
03	Jul-07	Mar-08	09	1,546	1,734	−188	−11
04	Apr-08	Mar-09	12	5,577	7,186	−1,609	−55
05	Apr-09	Mar-10	12	5,271	6,918	−1,647	−54
06	Apr-10	Mar-11	12	6,496	7,523	−1,027	−16
07	Apr-11	Sep-11	06	3,410	4,142	−732	n/a
Total			78	25,794	31,754	−5,960	

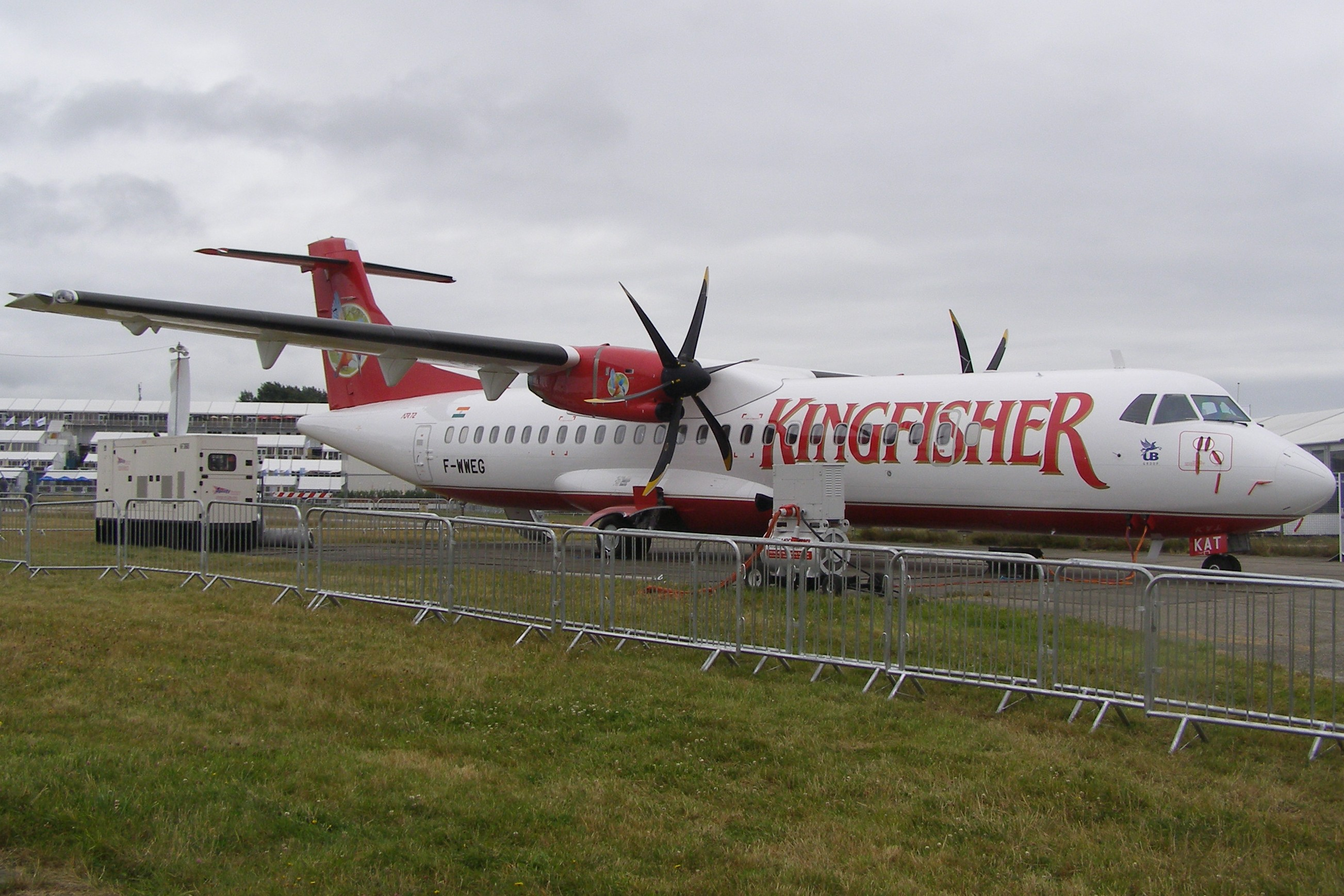
ATR 72-500

In November 2010, Kingfisher Airlines completed restructuring of ₹8,000 crore (US$830 million) debt, with all 18 lenders agreeing to cut interest rates and convert part of loans to equity. Lenders have converted ₹6.50 billion (US$67 million) debt into preference shares which will be converted into equity when the airline lists on the Luxembourg Stock Exchange by selling global depositary receipts (GDR). Shares will be converted into ordinary equity at the price at which the GDRs are sold to investors. Besides the ₹14 billion (US$150 million) debt which will be converted into preference shares, another ₹8 billion (US$83 million) debt has been converted into redeemable shares for 12 years. Airline's average interest rate is now down to 11%, helping the airline save ₹5 billion (US$52 million) crore every year on interest cost. Consortium of banks was represented by SBI Capital Markets. Kingfisher Airlines Ltd has informed BSE that the board of directors of the Company at its meeting held on 25 November 2010, has approved a Debt Recast Package (DRP) with lending banks, following a one-time relaxation in restructuring guidelines sanctioned by the Reserve Bank of India. The salient features of the DRP include:

1. Conversion of debt of up to ₹13.55 billion (US$140 million) from lenders into share capital.
2. Conversion of debt of up to ₹6.48 billion (US$67 million) from promoters into share capital.
3. Re-scheduling of repayment of the balance debt to lenders over 9 years with a moratorium of 2 years.
4. Reduction in interest rates.
5. Sanction of additional fund and non-fund based facilities by the lenders.

The recast plan involved the issuing of the following types of preference shares.

Share type	Dividend	Quantity	Price	Recipient
Redeemable Cumulative Preference Shares	8%	575,000,000	₹10 (10¢ US)	Consortium of lenders
Compulsorily Convertible Preference Shares	7.5%	780,000,000	₹10 (10¢ US)	Consortium of lenders
Compulsorily Convertible Preference Shares	7.5%	648,000,000	₹10 (10¢ US)	United Breweries (Holdings) Ltd, Kingfisher Finvest India Ltd
Optionally Convertible Debentures	8%	20,000,000	₹100 (US$1.00)	Star Investments Ltd.
Optionally Convertible Debentures	8%	30,000,000	₹100 (US$1.00)	Margosa Consultancy Pvt. Ltd.
Optionally Convertible Debentures	8%	30,000,000	₹100 (US$1.00)	Redect Consultancy Pvt. Ltd.

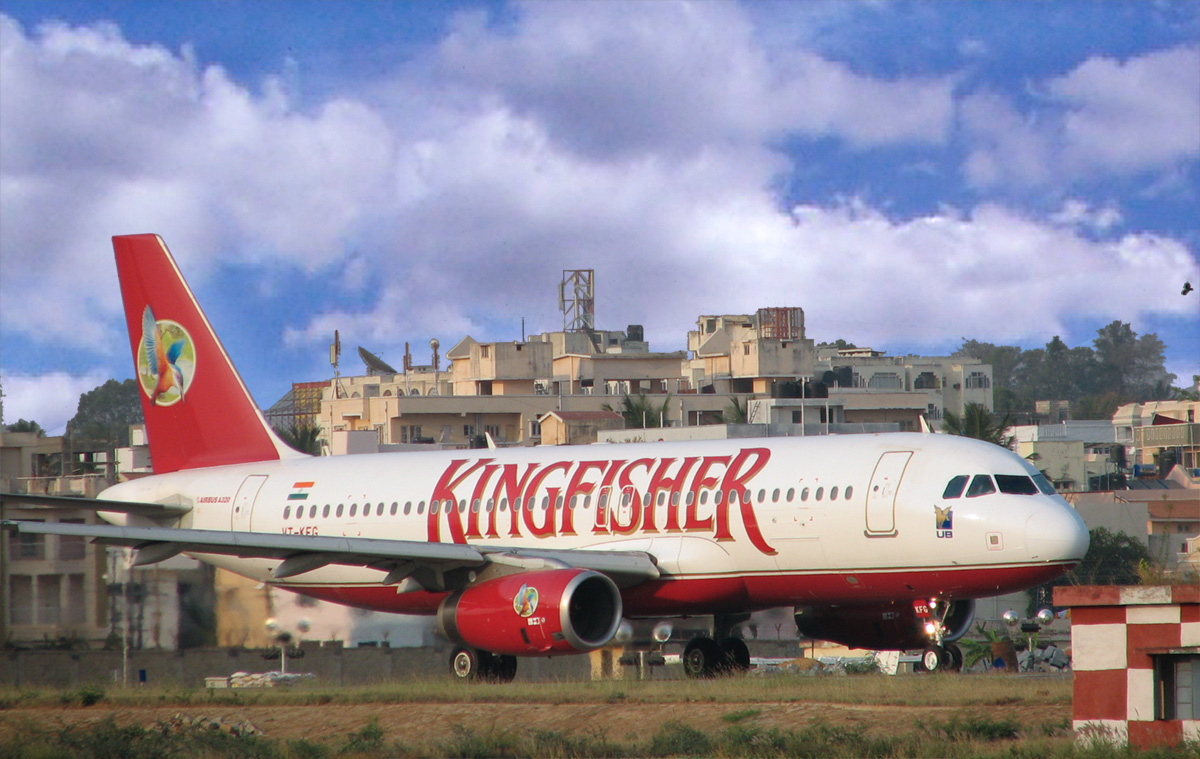
Airbus A320-200 taxiing at HAL Airport, Bangalore

In addition to these issues, 9,700,000 units of 6% Redeemable Preference Shares of ₹100 (US$1.00) each issued to United Breweries (Holdings) Ltd. (Promoter Company) were converted to 97,000,000 units of 6% Compulsorily Convertible Preference Shares of ₹10 (10¢ US) each. Kingfisher Airlines, in November 2011 was attempting for a second debt recast. However a second debt recast has been ruled out by the Government of India. The Minister of State for Finance made a statement on 9 December 2011. Kingfisher Airlines has pledged its brand as collateral with its lender consortium for ₹41 billion (US$430 million). The brand valuation was done by Grant Thorton in 2010. Reportedly the Brand has been valued and loan raised worth triple the carrier's market value. On 6 July 2011, pursuant to requirements prescribed under the Debt Recast Package Kingfisher Airlines' founder companies, United Breweries (Holdings) Ltd and Kingfisher Finvest Ltd, have pledged their entire stake in the airline with certain of its lenders. United Breweries Holdings Ltd held 199,598,555 shares (representing 40.1% of total outstanding shares) in the airline and has pledged all the shares to lenders. At the same time, Kingfisher Finvest Ltd held 63,478,570 shares (representing 12.75% of total outstanding shares) has pledged its entire holding to the lenders.

=== Erosion of net worth ===
In September 2011, the chairman and managing director of Kingfisher Airlines made following disclosure to the Bombay Stock Exchange(BSE); "The Company has incurred substantial losses and its net worth has been eroded. However, having regard to improvement in the economic sentiment, rationalization measures adopted by the Company, fleet recovery and the implementation of the debt recast package with the lenders and promoters including conversion of debt into share capital, these interim financial statements have been prepared on the basis that the Company is a going concern and that no adjustments are required to the carrying value of assets and liabilities" This filing was widely covered by Indian and international print and electronic media and analysts. It was stated by analysts and media that the company needed capital infusion to remain viable and this has pushed shares to near historic lows. Kingfisher Airlines Lenders later stated that they consider that company is viable. On 15 November 2011 the airline released poor financial results, indicating that it was "drowning in high-interest debt and losing money". Mallya indicated that his solution was for the government to reduce fuel and other taxes. The government was engaged in assessing whether to bail out the company and other airlines or let market forces determine which ones survive.

== Bankruptcy ==
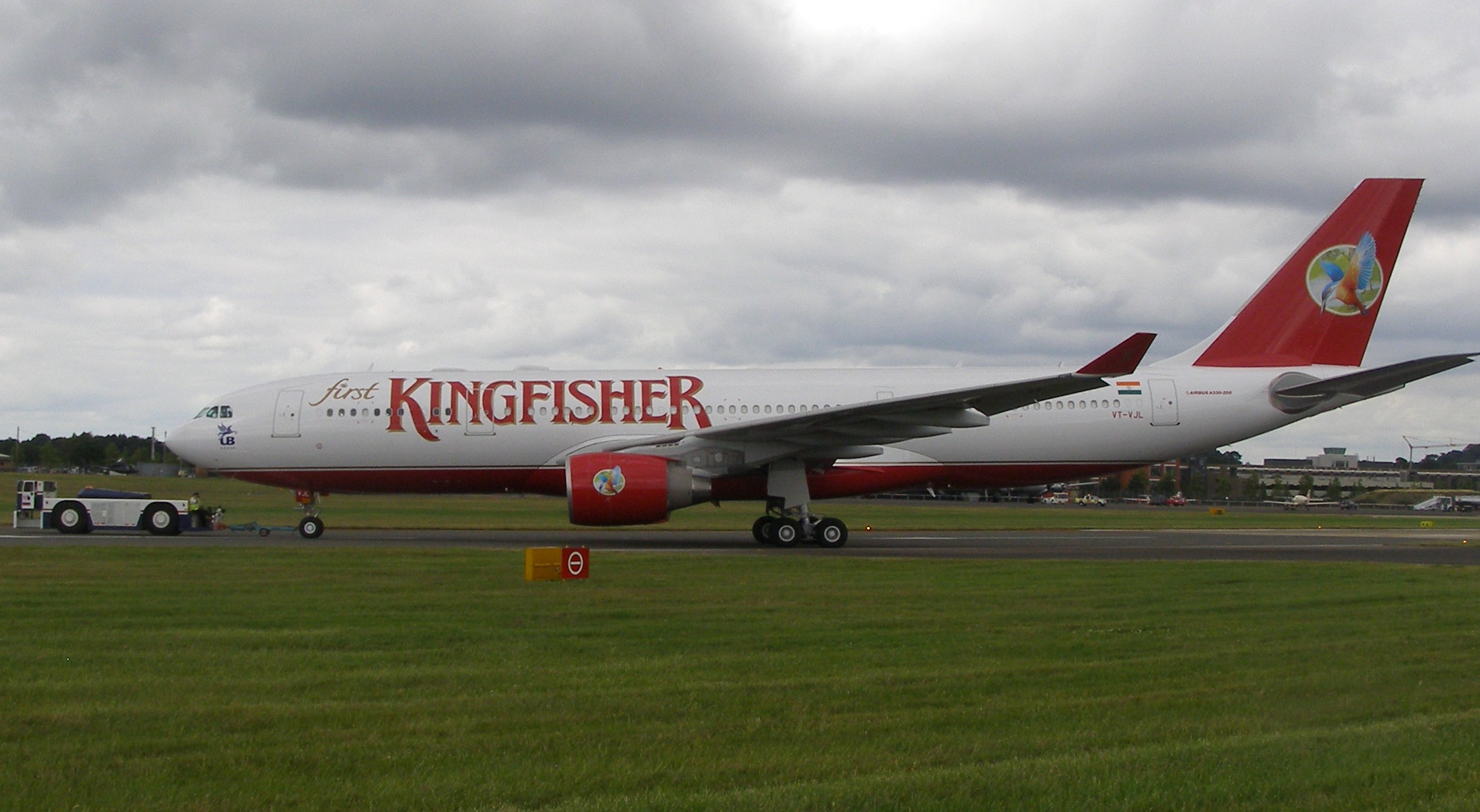
Airbus A330-200

Kingfisher received a notice from the Airports Authority of India in February 2012 regarding accumulated dues of ₹2,551 million (US$26 million). The airline was operating on a cash and carry basis for the last six months, with daily payments amounting to ₹08 million (US$83,000) On 9 December 2011, MC Joshi, CBDT chairman announced that it is considering legal action against Kingfisher for not paying tax and may go for prosecution. As of 10 January 2012, Kingfisher Airlines has service tax arrears of ₹600 million (US$6.2 million). The Ministry of Finance has given a concession to Kingfisher and instructed them to pay the dues by 31 March 2012. In January 2012, Kingfisher paid ₹20 crore (US$2.1 million) towards its dues for December 2011 and part of the arrears. Kingfisher Airlines has a staff strength of 6,000 and spends ₹580 million (US$6.0 million) on salaries a month. According to the first quarter financial results, it has ₹1,737 million (US$18 million) under the employees cost head, which has increased from ₹1,634 million (US$17 million) during the same quarter last year. Kingfisher Airlines delayed salaries of its employees in August 2011, and for four months in succession from October 2011 to January 2012 In a report to Directorate General of Civil Aviation (DGCA) on 9 January 2012, Kingfisher had stated that it has paid past (salary) dues to 60% of its employees and that by 31 January 2012, payment of December 2011 salary for all its employees will be done. Protesting at the delays in payment, Kingfisher pilots started making in-flight announcements citing "It is their sense of duty towards the guest that is making them fly despite not being paid salaries for the past two months". Kingfisher also defaulted on paying the Tax Deducted at Source from the employee income to the tax department.

=== Bank arrears ===
Kingfisher Airlines had not paid some bankers (Lenders) as per the Debt Recast Package (DRP) with lending banks. Till the end of December 2011, the arrears were estimated to be ₹260 crore (US$27 million) to ₹280 crore (US$29 million). Lenders hence had told Kingfisher Airlines to clear its dues before they can release any more money sought by the Airline. Ravi Nedungadi, chief financial officer of UB Group however said that the arrears were ₹180 crore (US$19 million). If arrears were not paid in time (December 2011); Kingfisher Airlines would automatically have been treated as NPA, (Non-performing asset). On the last working day of the third quarter of financial year 2011–2012, Kingfisher Airlines made one month interest amount to the banks; thus saving the account from becoming a non-performing asset.

State Bank of India (SBI) on 5 January 2012 declared Kingfisher Airlines a non-performing asset. SBI is the largest creditor and leader of the consortium of banks in the DRP (Debt Recast Package) and has an exposure of ₹14,578 million (US$150 million). By February 2012, Kingfisher has been declared a non-performing asset by the following banks;

- State Bank of India(SBI)
- Bank of Baroda
- Punjab National Bank(PNB)
- IDBI Bank(IDBI)
- Central Bank of India
- Bank of India(BOI)
- Corporation Bank

=== Aircraft lease and fuel dues ===
Since 2008, it has been reported that Kingfisher Airlines has been unable to pay the aircraft lease rentals on time. Kingfisher Airlines has grounded 15 out of 66 aircraft in its fleet as it was unable to meet the maintenance and overhaul expenses.

- GECAS: In November 2008, GE Commercial Aviation Services (GECAS) threatened to repossess four leased planes in lieu of default. Kingfisher Airlines initially denied that it missed the payments. GECAS had filed a complaint with DGCA saying Kingfisher had defaulted on rentals for four Airbus A320 aircraft, and sought repossession of the planes. In January 2009, The Karnataka High Court rejected petition by Kingfisher Airlines to restrain GECAS from taking any step to deregister and repossess the 04 aircraft in dispute. As a result, Kingfisher had to return the A320 aircraft to GECAS.
- DVB: In July 2010, DVB Aviation Finance Asia Ltd (DVB) (a lessor from Singapore), sued Kingfisher Airlines for lease rental default. Case was filed in a United Kingdom court on 16 July 2010 after Kingfisher did not pay for three-month lease rental for Airbus A320 aircraft it leased from DVB.
- Hindustan Petroleum Corporation Limited (HPCL): In July 2011, HPCL stopped the fuel (ATF) supplies for about two hours to Kingfisher Airlines owing to the non-payment of dues. The situation was later resolved by Kingfisher ex-chairman Vijay Mallya meeting the Central Board of Direct Taxes (CBDT) chairman to unfreeze some A/C's. In the past several years, Kingfisher Airlines has had trouble paying their fuel bills.
- Bharat Petroleum Corporation(BPCL) in 2009 had filed a case against Kingfisher Airlines for non-payment of dues. The High court ordered that the entire amount (₹2.45 billion (US$25 million)) had to be paid by November 2010 and the airline paid it in instalments.

== Aftermath ==
=== Cause ===
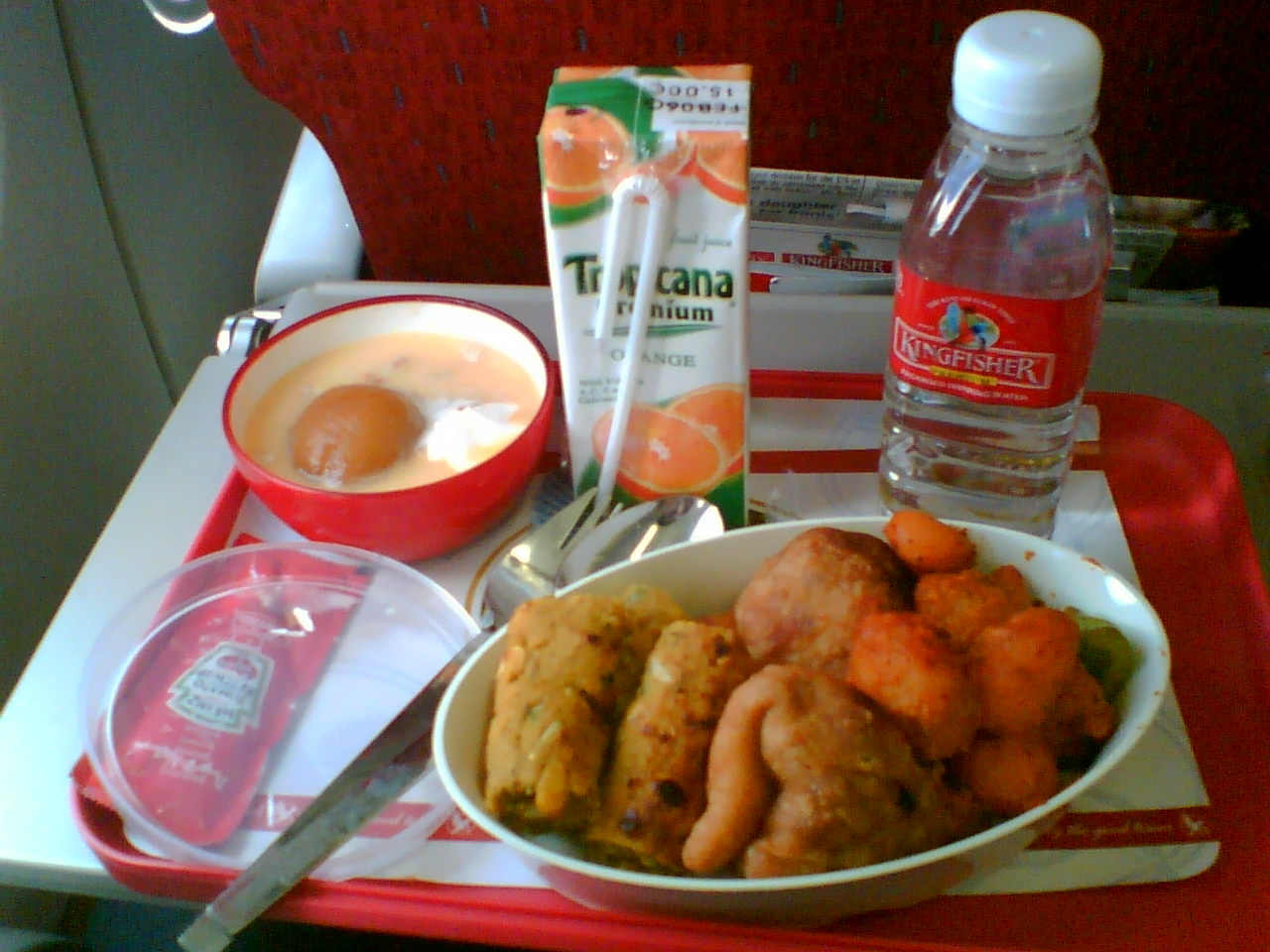
Economy class meal on board a Kingfisher Airlines domestic flight

Ever since the airline commenced operations in 2005, it has been reporting losses. After acquiring Air Deccan, Kingfisher suffered a loss of over ₹10 billion (US$100 million) for three consecutive years. By early 2012, the airline accumulated losses of over ₹70 billion (US$730 million) with half of its fleet grounded and several members of its staff going on strike. Kingfisher's position in top Indian airlines on the basis of market share had slipped to last from 2 because of the crisis. In December 2011, for the second time in two months, Kingfisher's bank accounts were frozen by the Mumbai Income Tax department for non-payment of dues. Kingfisher Airlines owes ₹70 crore (US$7.3 million) to the service tax department. Indian tax body also stated that Kingfisher Airlines is delinquent

As a response, Vijay Mallya called on the CBDT chairman and offered to pay up the dues by 13 December 2011. Kingfisher bank accounts were unfrozen on 14 December 2011. Due to non-payment, several Kingfisher's vendors had filed winding up petition with the High Court. As of November 2011, a winding up petition of seven creditors was pending before the Bangalore High Court. In the past Lufthansa Technik & Bharat Petroleum Corporation Limited (BPCL) had also filed winding up petition against Kingfisher Airlines On 1 January 2013, the airline's flying permit lapsed after it missed the deadline for renewal.

=== Fleet grounding ===
During late February 2012, Kingfisher Airlines started to sink into a fresh crisis. Several flights were cancelled and aircraft were grounded. The airline claimed that the disruptions will continue for four days due to unexpected events including bird strikes which rendered aircraft out of service. The airline shut down most international short-haul operations and also temporarily closed bookings. Out of the 64 aircraft, only 22 were known to be operational by 20 February. With this, Kingfisher's market share clearly dropped to 11.3%. The cancellation of the flights was accompanied by a 13.5% drop in the stocks of the company on 20 February 2012. The CEO of the airlines, Sanjay Agarwal was summoned by the Directorate General of Civil Aviation to explain the disruptions of the operations.

The State Bank of India, which is the lead lender to Kingfisher Airlines said that they would not consider giving any more loans to Kingfisher unless and until it comes up with a new equity by itself. Political activists also claimed that bailing or helping a private airline would lead to problems within the Government. By 27 February, Kingfisher operated only above 150 out of its 400 flights and only 28 aircraft were functional. Reuters reported that if Kingfisher were to shut down, it would be the biggest failure in the history of Indian aviation. It was announced that the direct flights to the smaller airports of Jaipur, Thiruvananthapuram, Nagpur and also to Hyderabad's Rajiv Gandhi International Airport were all shut down and only one/two-stop flights from its main hubs of Delhi – Indira Gandhi International Airport(IGIA) and Chhatrapati Shivaji International Airport Mumbai would operate. In response to a situation as bad as bankruptcy, Vijay Mallya announced that he had organised funds to pay all the employees' overdue salaries. With bank accounts frozen and huge debts due, it is unknown so as from where he arranged the money. But he apologised to his workers and said that he would pay them immediately. By this time, kingfisher had accumulated losses of ₹4.44 billion (US$46 million) during the third quarter of the fiscal year 2011–12. Reuters then reported that Etihad Airways was interested in investing in Kingfisher by providing equity in exchange for a stake in the airline. Also involved in the talks was the International Airlines Group, owner of British flag carrier British Airways and Spanish flag carrier Iberia.

=== Other controversies ===
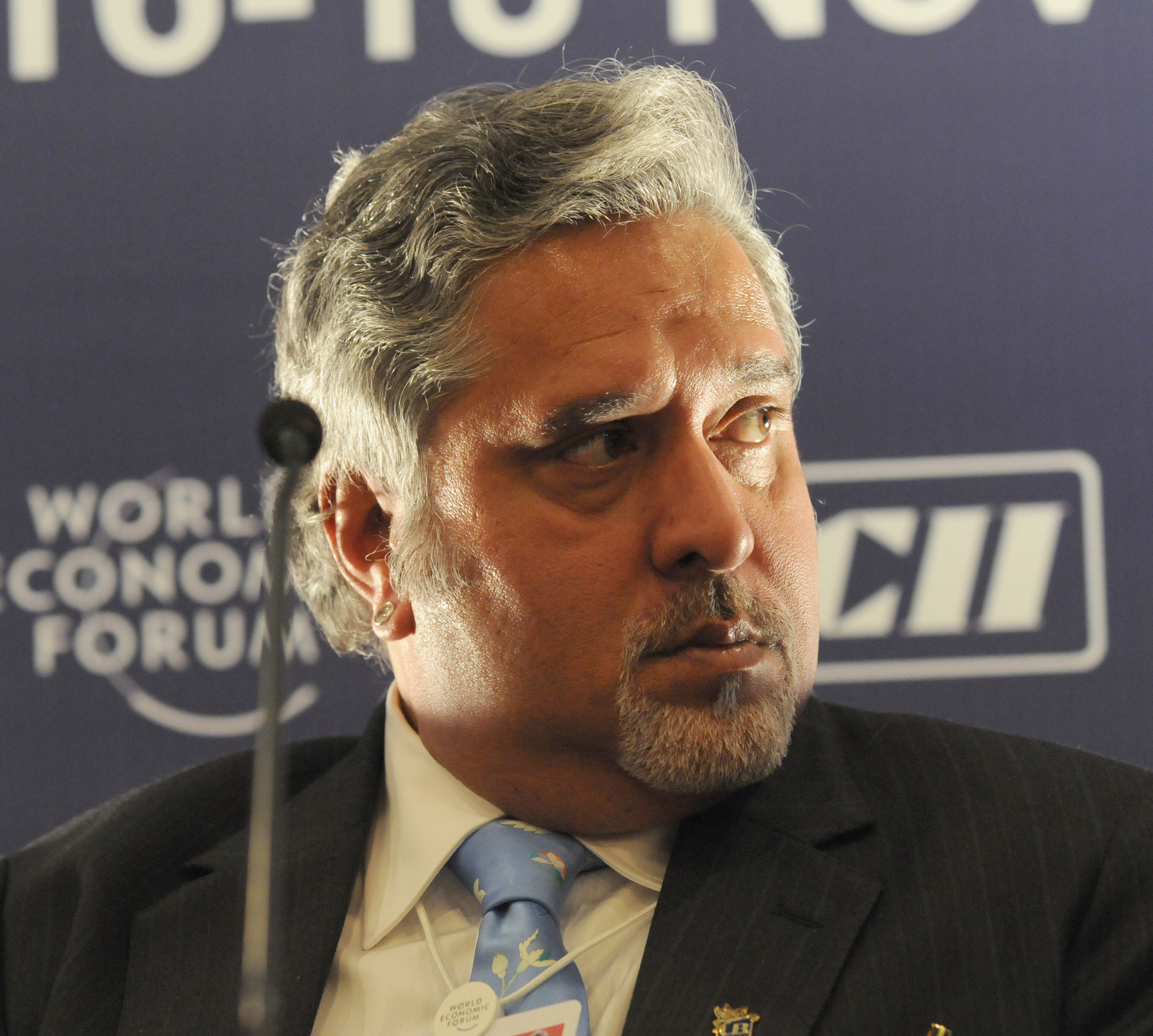
Vijay Mallya, the ex-chairman of Kingfisher and UB

On 3 March 2012, The CBDT of India froze many more Kingfisher accounts as it was unable to pay all the dues as per schedule. Kingfisher was meant to pay ₹10 million (US$100,000) per working day. It reportedly missed the deadline set by the board and could not pay the dues until the evening on 29 February. This led to more accounts being frozen. The airline neither did comment on the situation, nor pay the taxes. Aviation minister Ajit Singh warned the airline about the temporary suspension of the license until the crisis was sorted out. He announced that the rest of the airline's fleet would be grounded and all flights cancelled until the crisis came to an end. This would be only one step from permanently closing the airline. On 7 March 2012 IATA suspended ticket sales of Kingfisher Airlines citing non-payment of dues as the primary reason, and they said that sales services will only be restored once Kingfisher settles ICH (IATA Clearing House) account. IATA also immediately directed all travel agents to stop booking tickets for Kingfisher. According to preliminary reports, this would affect Kingfisher's business by around 30%. Kingfisher claimed that frozen bank accounts was the main cause of being unable to pay the IATA, and the airline started making alternate arrangements for the sale of tickets.

Soon it became difficult for the airline to follow the much smaller schedule that it earlier released as even more pilots began to go on strike. A pilot later claimed that from 12 March, about 80% of the pilots would not fly as they mentioned in their letter to Vijay Mallya. The airline's plans on restarting all services by 4 April did not seem too real at the moment. On 12 October 2012 an income tax court in Hyderabad issued a non-bailable warrant against Kingfisher Airlines and its chairman Vijay Mallya in a case of 'bouncing' cheques filed by GMR Hyderabad International Airport Ltd (GHIAL). The case pertains to bouncing of cheques worth Rs 100 million issued by Kingfisher Airlines to GMR as Hyderabad airport charges. GMR Hyderabad International Airport Ltd, which manages the Rajiv Gandhi International Airport, had earlier moved the Nampally criminal court in Hyderabad and filed a case against Kingfisher for dishonouring four cheques worth Rs 105 million. On 20 October 2012, Kingfisher's licence was suspended by the Directorate General of Civil Aviation after it failed to address the Indian regulator's concerns about its operations.

== See also ==
- List of airlines of India
- Kingfisher Airlines
