= Al Hind Air =

Indian airline

alhind Air
- Hubs: Cochin International Airport
- Destinations: Thiruvananthapuram, Kochi, Kozhikode
- Parent company: Alhind Group of Companies
- Headquarters: Kozhikode
- Key people: Reena Abdul Rahiman (CEO)
- Founder: Mohammed Haris T
- Website: https://www.alhindair.com/

Notes
- Motto: Transforming Flights into Lasting Memories!

Al Hind Air is an Indian regional airline from Kerala. It received no-objection certificate (NOC) from the Ministry of Civil Aviation in December 2025 under UDAN scheme to enhance regional connectivity. Operations are expected to begin later in 2026, after obtaining the final Air Operator Certificate (AOC). It will initially operate as a regional commuter carrier, focusing on domestic routes.

As of late 2025, the civil aviation sector in India consists of nine operational scheduled domestic airlines.

== AlHind Group ==
AlHind Group is a Kerala-based conglomerate with significant presence in the UAE. It was founded and promoted by Mohammed Haris T who is a veteran in travel and tourism sector especially Haj pilgrimage. Established in the early 1990s, it expanded to the Middle East in 1995 and launched a significant B2B portal in 2014.

== Pre-Launch Challenges ==
Despite securing its NOC in December 2025, Alhind Air’s transition from a travel conglomerate to a commercial airline is currently stalled by aircraft acquisition and financing disputes. Due to prolonged delays between the initial plan and the NOC issuance, holding costs skyrocketed.

=== Fleet Constraints ===
Initial reports suggest that this airline carrier will operate ATR 72-600 aircraft from Kochi. Alhind Air’s launch has been stalled by a preference for purchasing three pre-owned ATR 72 turboprops (4–5 years old) aircraft instead of leasing to lower long-term costs, which requires massive upfront capital that lenders are currently hesitant to provide.

=== Financial Difficulties ===
Just days after receiving its NOC from the government, reports emerged that Alhind Air has placed its staff on indefinite unpaid leave due to severe financial strain. Citing the Financial Express, Outlook Business reported that approximately 120 employees have been instructed not to report for duty. The airline revealed monthly expenditures of roughly ₹2 crore (primarily salaries) without any incoming revenue, leading to "significant financial losses."

=== Regulatory Requirements ===
For begin the flight operations, the airline must still complete aircraft induction, crew training and regulatory "proving flights" — a process that the company claims to be "prolonged" and "challenging."

== See also ==
- 2025 IndiGo disruption
- Directorate General of Civil Aviation (India)
- List of airports in India
- List of airlines of India
- Aviation in India
- List of companies of India
- Transport in India
