= Shankh Air =

Indian airline

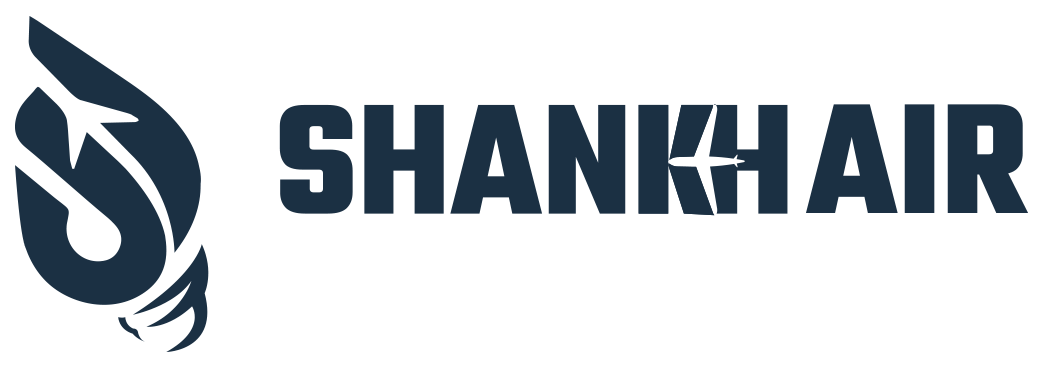
- Parent company: Shankh Aviation Pvt. Ltd.
- Key people: Sharvan Kumar Vishwakarma (Chairman and Managing Director)
- Website: https://shankhair.com/

Shankh Air is an upcoming Indian full-service regional airline company planning to serve the flight routes in Uttar Pradesh. It is authorized by Ministry of Civil Aviation under UDAN scheme to enhance regional connectivity in the country. As of December 2025, there were nine operational scheduled domestic carriers in Indian aviation sector.

Initial report suggests that this domestic airline carrier will operate from Gorakhpur, Lucknow & Varanasi with flights scheduled to commence in first quarter of 2026.

== See also ==
- 2025 IndiGo disruption
- Directorate General of Civil Aviation (India)
- List of airports in India
- List of airlines of India
- Aviation in India
- List of companies of India
- Transport in India
