= IndiGo fleet =

List of aircraft operated by IndiGo

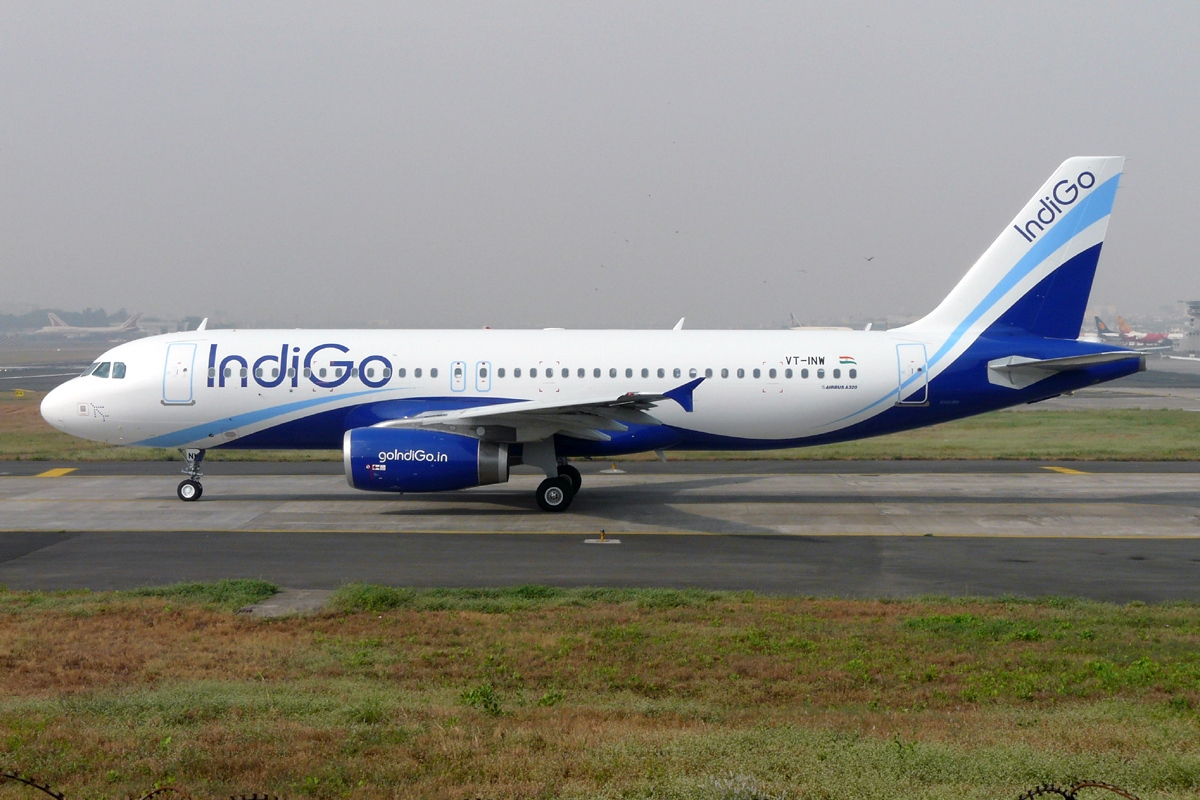
Airbus A320 of IndiGo in its blue livery

IndiGo is an Indian low-cost airline, which is the largest airline in India and the fourth largest Asian airline by fleet size and number of passengers carried.

The airline was established in 2006. Since its establishment, the airline's fleet has majorly consisted of narrow body aircraft of the Airbus A320 family. The airline received its first Airbus A320neo in 2016, which gradually replaced the older A320s in the fleet and is the largest operator of the type. In 2017, the airline took delivery of its first ATR 72-600 aircraft, and type is used for short-haul flights. As of February 2026, the airline operates a fleet of Airbus A320-200, A320neo, A321neo and A321XLR aircraft. On average, 54% of the services are operated using A321neo aircraft, 35% with A320neo, and rest using other aircraft.

To cater for the growing future traffic and demands, the airline has ordered nearly a thousand aircraft since 2023 including Airbus A350 wide body aircraft. Earlier A320 aircraft of IndiGo were powered by Pratt & Whitney PW1000G engines, which were grounded following a suspected issue in 2023. Since 2020, the Airbus aircraft delivered to IndiGo have been fitted with CFM LEAP-1A engines. The airline uses a two tone blue livery on a white background with the belly of the aircraft painted in indigo with the logo in white on all its aircraft.

== Current fleet ==
As of September 2026, IndiGo operates the following aircraft:

IndiGo fleet
Aircraft	In service	Orders	Passengers			Notes
Aircraft	In service	Orders	W	Y	Total	Notes
Airbus A320-200	26	—	—	180	180	To be retired
Airbus A320neo	174	217	—	180	180	Largest operator
Airbus A320neo	174	217	—	186	186	Largest operator
Airbus A321neo	186	582	12	208	220	Second largest operator
Airbus A321neo	186	582	—	222	222	Second largest operator
Airbus A321neo	186	582	—	232	232	Second largest operator
Airbus A321XLR	4	582	12	183	195	Largest order
Airbus A350-900	—	60	TBA			Order with 40 options Deliveries from 2027
ATR 72-600	44	—	—	78	78	
IndiGo CarGo fleet
Airbus A321-200/P2F	3	—	Cargo			
Total	437	859				

== Former fleet ==
Former fleet
Aircraft	Total	Introduced	Retired	Replacement	Notes
Airbus A320-200	74	2006	2025	Airbus A320neo	
Airbus A320neo	52	2016	2026	None	

== Fleet history ==
- On 16 June 2005, IndiGo placed an order for 100 Airbus A320-200 aircraft worth US$6 billion during the Paris Air Show with plans to commence operations in mid 2006.
- On 28 July 2006, the airline received its first A320-200. The airline planned to induct 100 aircraft by 2015–2016.
- On 12 January 2011, IndiGo signed a memorandum of understanding for an additional 180 Airbus A320 family aircraft, including 150 with the New Engine Option (neo), worth US$15 billion.
- On 12 February 2012, the airline took delivery of its 50th aircraft, and the 100th aircraft was delivered on 4 November 2014, completing its initial order ahead of schedule.
- The Airbus A320neo family aircraft ordered in 2011 were to be delivered starting 2015. However, due to a delay in the production and delivery of these aircraft, IndiGo dry-leased a total of 22 used aircraft to cope with the demand.
- On 15 October 2014, IndiGo expressed its intention to order a further 250 A320neo aircraft worth US$25.7 billion at list prices.
- On 15 August 2015, IndiGo confirmed the order for 250 A320neo aircraft for $26.5 billion. The order also provided IndiGo an option to convert some A320neos to A321LRs that can seat more passengers and fly on longer routes. The order for 250 jets was Airbus' single largest order by number of aircraft.
- On 11 March 2016, IndiGo received its first A320neo.
- On 9 May 2017, IndiGo tentatively signed for 50 ATR 72-600 turboprop aircraft for the UDAN regional connectivity scheme, to be delivered from the year end for up to 20 by the end of 2018.
- On 17 November 2017, IndiGo took delivery of its first ATR 72-600.
- On 10 October 2019, Airbus delivered its 1000th A320neo aircraft to IndiGo.
- On 29 October 2019, IndiGo placed a firm order for 300 A320neo family aircraft comprising a mix of 87 A320neo, 144 A321neo and 69 A321XLR, taking IndiGo's total number of A320neo family aircraft orders to 730.
- On 28 May 2023, IndiGo inducted its first wide-body aircraft, a Boeing 777-300ER wet leased from Turkish Airlines.
- On 19 June 2023, the airline placed an order for 500 Airbus A320neo family aircraft worth $55 billion excluding potential bulk-order concessions. It is the largest single aircraft order in commercial aviation history with deliveries between 2030 and 2035.
- On 25 April 2024, IndiGo signed a deal with Airbus for 30 A350-900 aircraft with 70 options at a cost of US$5 billion, thereby taking the total number to a hundred wide-body aircraft. This order marked the airline's entry to consist of and operate wide-body aircraft for the first time in its history in a full-fledged way as part of its long-term future plans. The deliveries of these aircraft will begin from 2027.
- Since May 2024, IndiGo is also planning to place an order of at least a hundred smaller, regional aircraft such as the ATR 72, the Airbus A220 or the Embraer E175, to further give impetus on regional expansion and connectivity.
- On 14 November 2024, the airline's first A321neo with IndiGo's brand new business class product, namely IndiGo Stretch, entered service.
- On 1 March 2025, IndiGo started operating up to six damp-leased Boeing 787-9 from Norse Atlantic Airways to augment its long-haul fleet.
- On 17 October 2025, IndiGo placed a firm order for 30 Airbus A350-900 aircraft, bringing the total order to 60.
- On 7 January 2026, the airline received its first A321XLR, debuting the aircraft in the Mumbai–Delhi route.
- On 31 July 2026, IndiGo announced the termination of the lease agreement with Norse Atlantic and that the leased 787-9 operation will conclude by 25 October 2026 on fields of rising operational costs and airspace closures due to geopolitical tensions. The Mumbai–Amsterdam route will thereafter be operated with A321XLR while their service to London Heathrow would remain ceased until A350 deliveries resume.
- On 25 October 2026, IndiGo commenced the operation of world's longest scheduled route of the A321XLR between Mumbai and Amsterdam at a distance of 6,865 km (3,707 nmi).

== Fleet groundings in 2023 and 2024 ==
In September 2023, Pratt & Whitney announced that its PW1000G geared turbofan engines fitted to A320neo aircraft need to be inspected due to suspected metal contamination during the manufacture of some of the engine parts. The issue, which was first discovered in July 2023, might cause cracks to develop in the engine components. In November 2023, media reports indicated that 45 to 50 aircraft of IndiGo were grounded due to the engine issue, which might increase to 70 to 80 aircraft by March 2024. In response, the airline retained 14 older aircraft, extended leases on 36 aircraft, and additionally planned to lease 23 aircraft including 11 on short term wet lease. By February 2024, about 70 aircraft were grounded both due to supply chain issues delaying replacement parts and delay in engine inspection. In July 2024, the airline leased nine Boeing 737 MAX 8 aircraft from Qatar Airways for operations on international routes. By September 2024, about 70 aircraft still remained grounded, with the airline expecting the number to drop as the aircraft are returned to service.
