= FlyExpress (airline) =

Indian domestic airline

IATA	ICAO	Call sign
-	-	-
- Founded: 2025
- Commenced operations: 2026
- Hubs: Rajiv Gandhi International Airport
- Key people: Konkati Suresh (founder)
- Website: https://flyexpressairlines.com/

FlyExpress is an Indian low-cost regional airline that is set to operationalize in Telangana from 2026. It received no-objection certificate (NOC) from the Ministry of Civil Aviation in December 2025 under UDAN scheme to enhance regional connectivity. At the time of this announcement, the civil aviation sector in India had nine operational scheduled domestic airlines.

Initial report suggest that this airline carrier will also focus on freight along with travelers from Tier-I and Tier-II cities.

== See also ==
- 2025 IndiGo disruption
- Directorate General of Civil Aviation (India)
- List of airports in India
- Aviation in India
- List of companies of India
- Transport in India
