= Air India fleet =

List of aircraft operated by Air India

Air India operates a fleet of both narrow-body and wide-body aircraft with a fleet consisting of Airbus A319, A320, A320neo, A321, A321neo, A350 as well as the Boeing 777 and Boeing 787.

== Current fleet ==
As of October 2026, Air India operates the following aircraft:

Aircraft	In service	Orders	Passengers						Notes
Aircraft	In service	Orders	F	C	W	Y	Total	Refs	Notes
Airbus A319-100	6	—	—	8	—	114	122		To be retired and replaced by Airbus A320neo
Airbus A320-200	4	—	—	12	—	138	150		
Airbus A320neo	86	90	—	8	24	132	164		
Airbus A320neo	86	90	—	—	—	180	180		≤4 to be transferred to Air India Express
Airbus A321-200	13	—	—	12	—	170	182		To be retrofitted with three-class configuration from 2026
Airbus A321neo	10	195	—	12	24	152	188		
Airbus A321XLR	—	15	TBA						Deliveries from 2029
Airbus A350-900	6	19	—	28	24	264	316		
Airbus A350-1000	—	25	TBA						Deliveries from 2026
Boeing 777-300ER	13	—	4	35	—	303	342		Currently being refreshed To be refurbished with a four-class configuration from early 2027
Boeing 777-300ER	13	—	4	35	—	305	344		Currently being refreshed To be refurbished with a four-class configuration from early 2027
Boeing 777-300ER	6	—	8	40	—	280	328		Ex-Etihad aircraft
Boeing 777-9	—	10	TBA						
Boeing 787-8	26	—	—	20	25	205	250		Retrofitted configuration
Boeing 787-8	26	—	—	18	—	238	256		To be refurbished
Boeing 787-8	26	—	—	18	—	241	259		To be refurbished
Boeing 787-9	6	—	—	30	21	248	299		
Boeing 787-9	4	16	—	30	28	238	296		Order with 20 options
Total	180	371							

Hover over each photo to view label detail

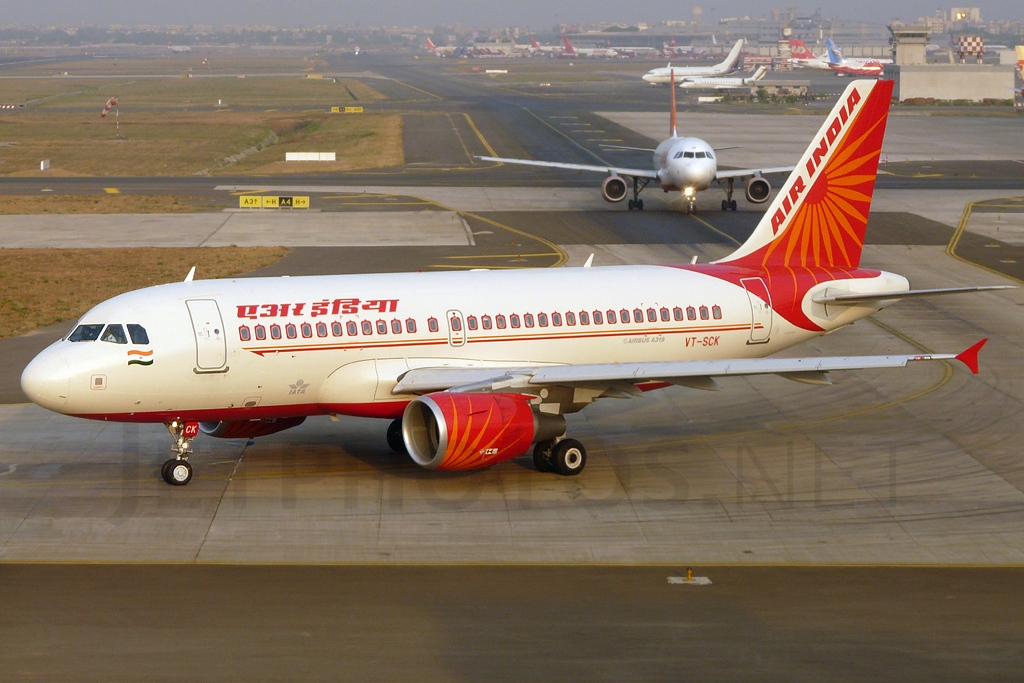
Airbus A319-100

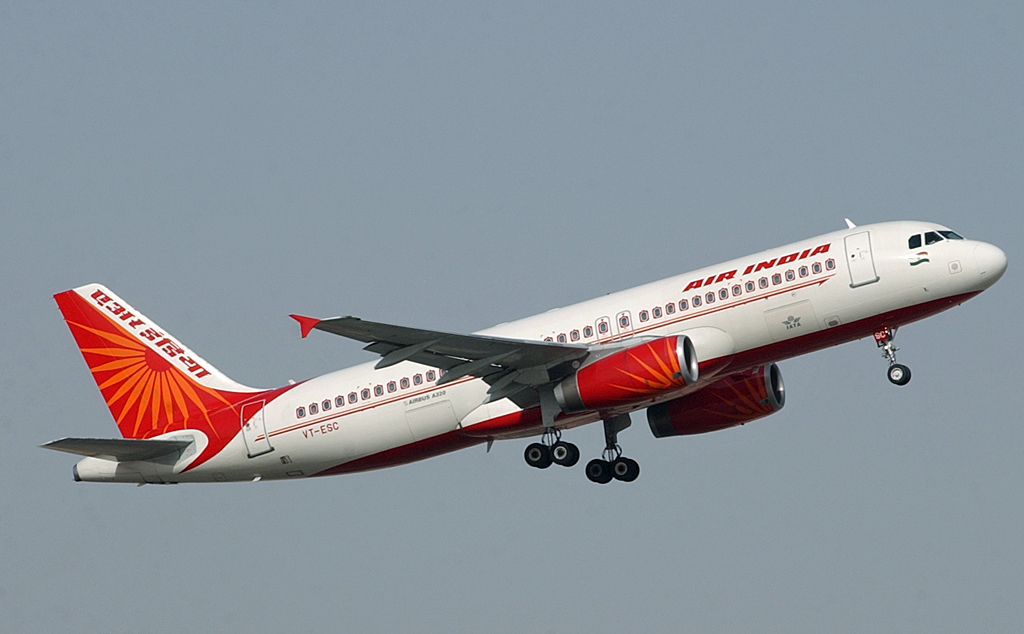
Airbus A320-200

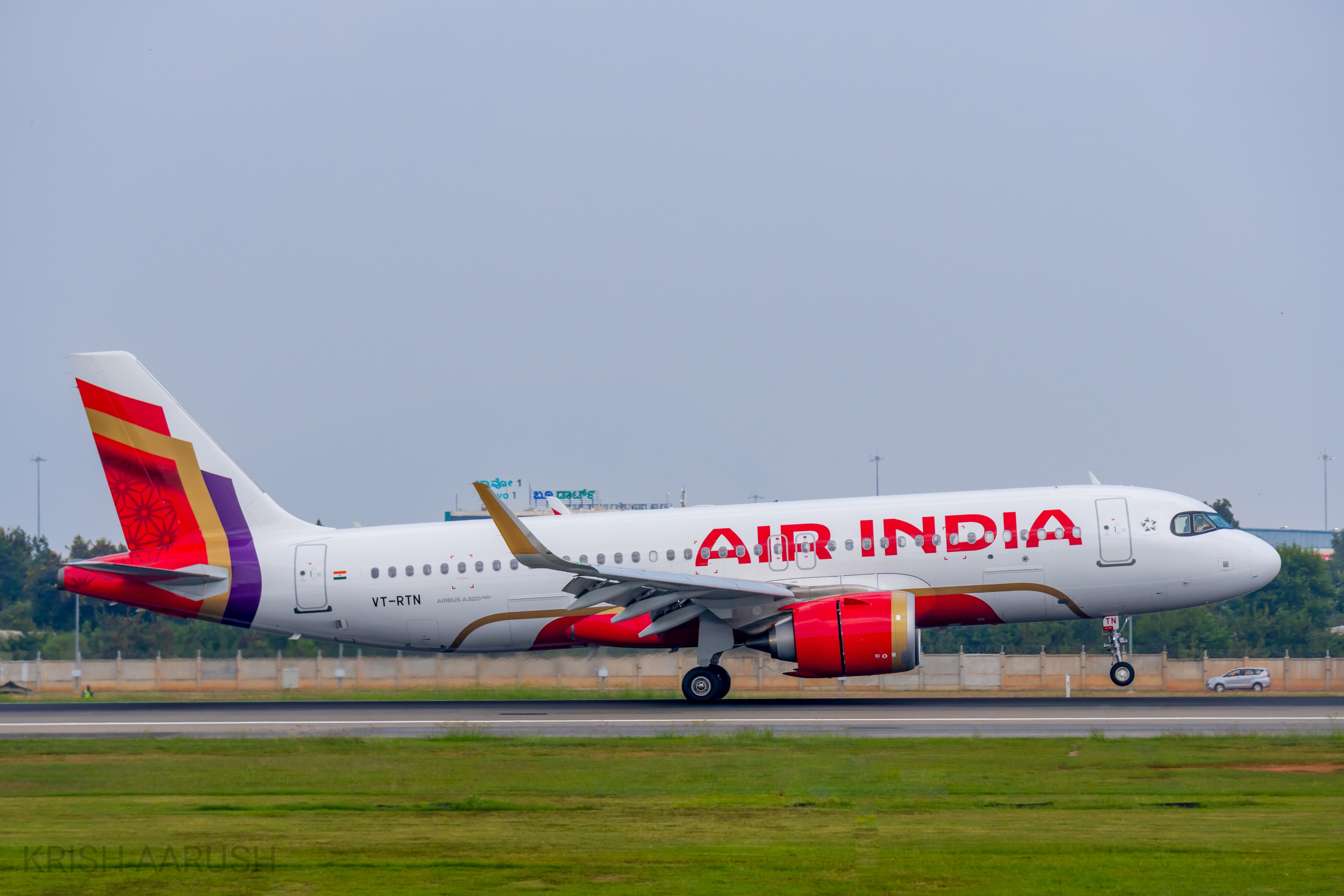
Airbus A320neo

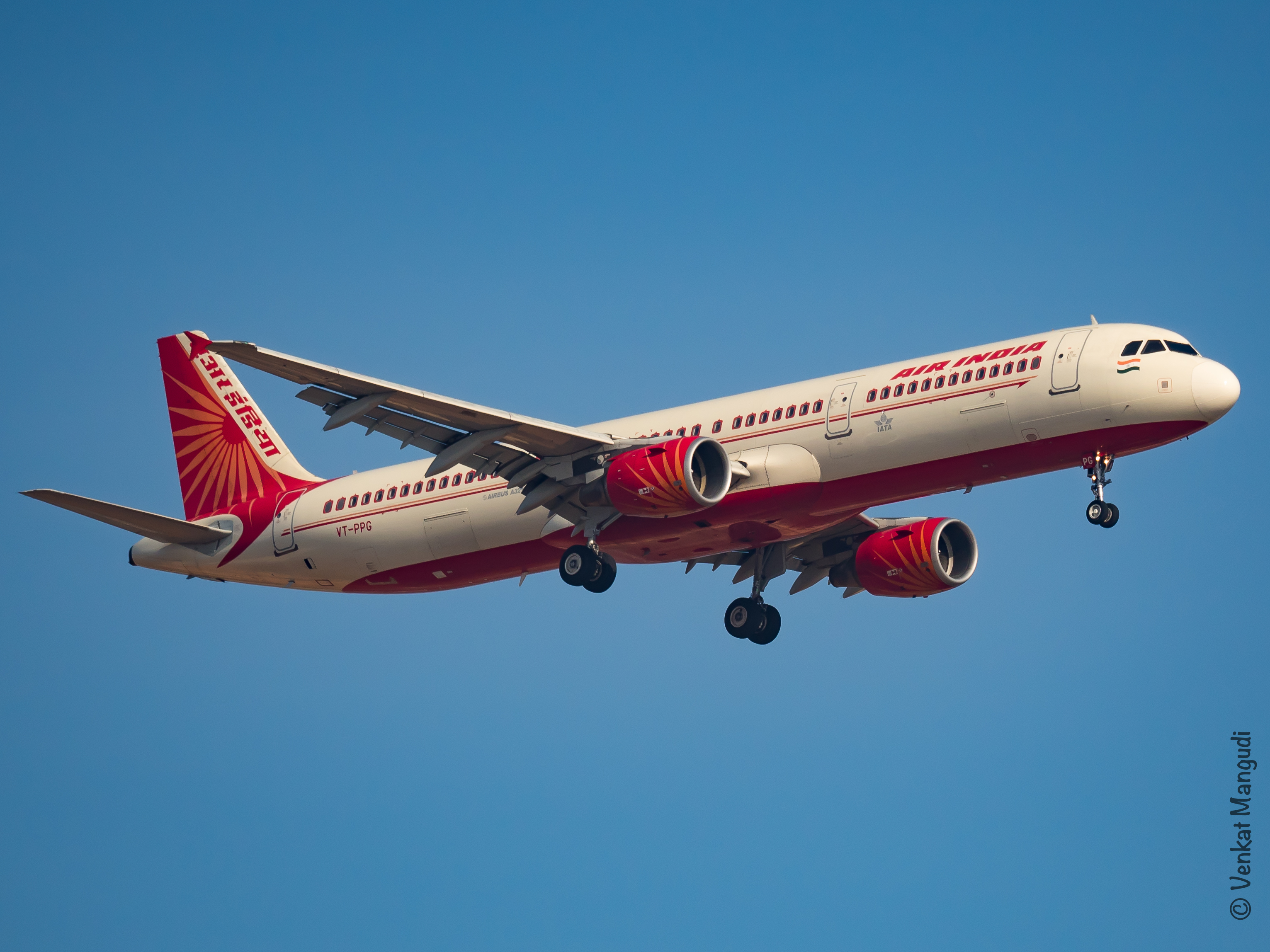
Airbus A321-200

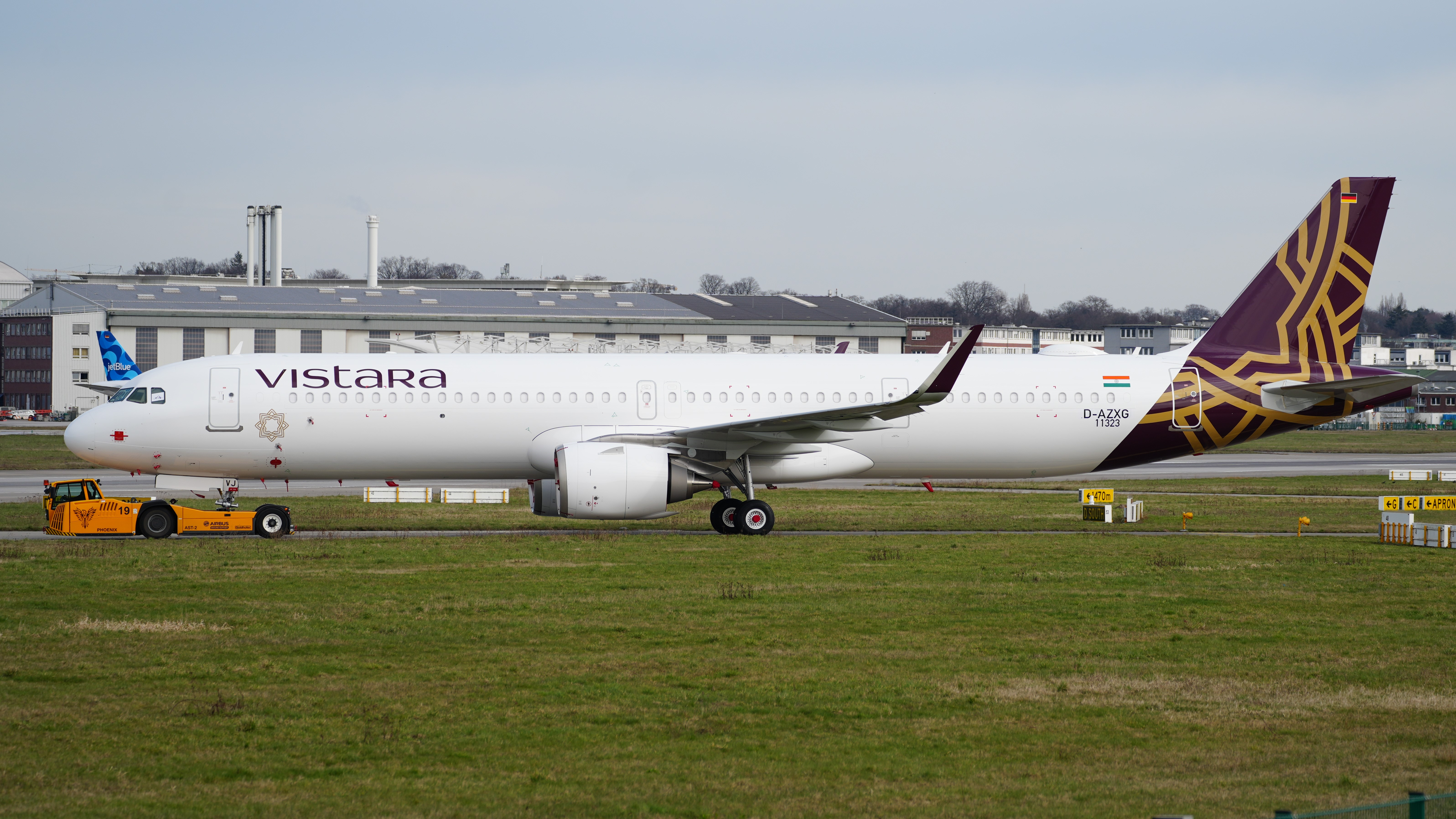
Airbus A321neo

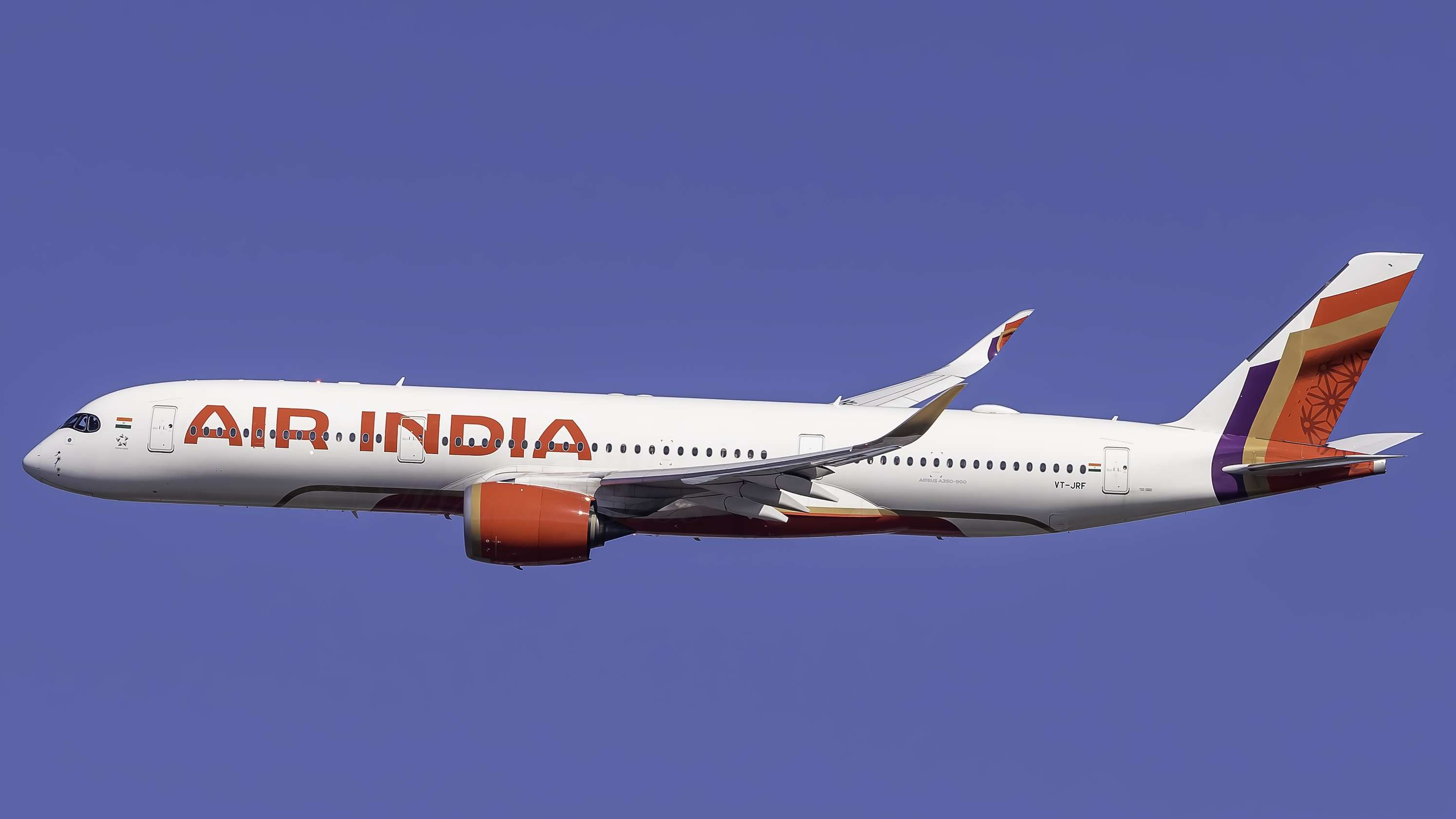
Airbus A350-900

Boeing 777-300ER

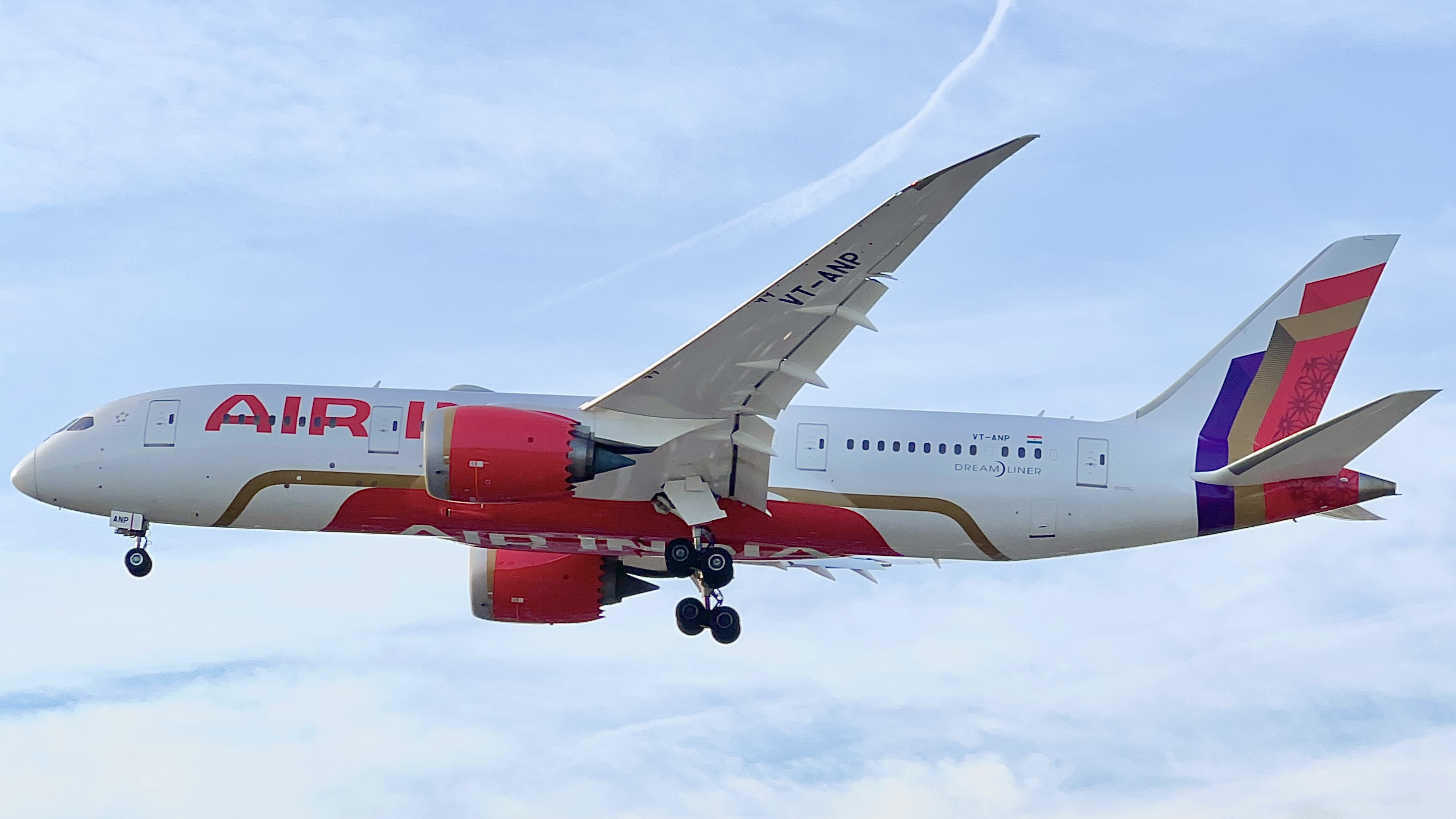
Boeing 787-8

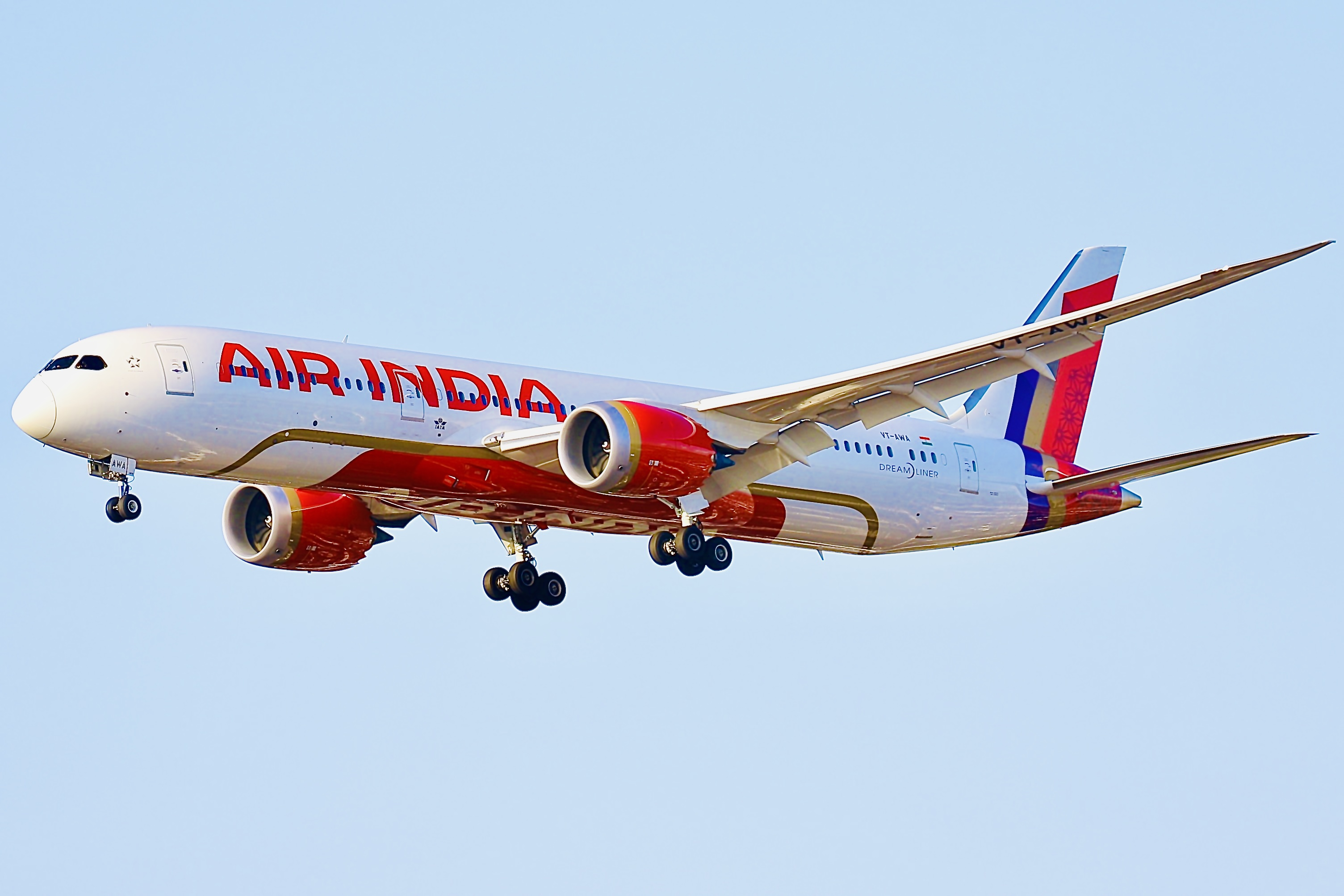
Boeing 787-9

== Fleet development ==
In 1932, Air India started operations with the De Havilland Puss Moth aircraft. On 21 February 1960, Air India International inducted its first Boeing 707 named Gauri Shankar (registered VT-DJJ), thereby becoming the first Asian airline to induct a jet aircraft in its fleet. In 1971, the airline took delivery of its first wide-body aircraft, a Boeing 747-200B named Emperor Ashoka (registered VT-EBD). In 1986, Air India introduced its first Airbus aircraft, an Airbus A310-300. On 4 August 1993, Air India took the delivery of its first Boeing 747-400 named Konark (registered VT-ESM). Indian Airlines introduced the Airbus A320 family of aircraft in 1989 and the smaller Airbus A319s in 2005, which are now used by Air India on domestic and regional routes, respectively. On 11 January 2006, Air India announced an order for 68 jets – 8 Boeing 777-200LR, 15 Boeing 777-300ER, 18 Boeing 737-800 and 27 Boeing 787-8 Dreamliners. The 18 Boeing 737s ordered were later transferred to Air India Express when Air India took delivery of the Dreamliners. After the merger with Indian Airlines in 2007, Air India inducted the Airbus A321 in its fleet to operate mainly on short-haul international routes and leased the Airbus A330s to operate on medium-haul international routes.

The airline took delivery of its first Boeing 777-200LR aircraft on 26 July 2007, which was named Andhra Pradesh, and the first Boeing 777-300ER on 9 October 2007, which was named as Bihar. The carrier sold three Airbus A300 and one Boeing 747 in March 2009 for US$18.75 million, due to debts. It also sold five of its eight Boeing 777-200LR aircraft to Etihad Airways in December 2013. Air India received its first Boeing 787 Dreamliner aircraft on 6 September 2012, commencing flights on 19 September 2012, which along with 777s, have since replaced the aging and fuel-inefficient 747s in the fleet of international routes. On 21 April 2014, Air India decided to sell its remaining three Boeing 777-200LRs as well, citing higher operating costs. On 24 April 2014, Air India issued a tender for leasing 14 Airbus A320 aircraft for up to six years, to strengthen its domestic network.

In December 2022, a day after the merger announcement with Vistara, it was reported that Air India would order nearly five hundred new aircraft. On 14 February 2023, Air India announced an order for 470 aircraft with options for 370 aircraft from Airbus and Boeing consisting of 210 A320neo family, 40 A350, 190 737 MAX for Air India Express, 20 787-9 and 10 777-9 aircraft at a cost of US$70 billion, with deliveries beginning in late 2023. The airline announced that it would be leasing 36 aircraft, 25 narrow-body aircraft and 11 wide-body aircraft, till the delivery of the newly ordered planes. On 26 March 2023, Air India took delivery of its first Airbus A321neo, albeit a leased one. As part of its fleet restructuring, Air India unveiled its new logo, livery and branding on 10 August 2023 and received its first re-branded aircraft, an Airbus A350-900, on 23 December 2023. On 22 April 2024, Air India sold their remaining four Boeing 747 aircraft to the US company AerSale.

On 12 November 2024, with the merger of Vistara and Air India, all of Vistara's 70 aircraft were transferred to Air India.

The airline revealed that it had placed another order of 100 aircraft from Airbus on 9 December 2024, converted from its options from the previous order. The deal comprised an additional 10 A350 aircraft and 90 A320 family aircraft.

In December 2025, the airline is expected to receive its first Boeing 787-9 aircraft. This will be followed by the induction of a wide-body aircraft every six weeks throughout 2026–28. While two of these aircraft in FY2026-27 will be Airbus A350-1000s, the rest will be 787-9s.

In March 2026, Air India revived its last grounded aircraft, registered as VT-ALL, a Boeing 777-300ER. The aircraft has been grounded since January 2020 and entered the Nagpur MRO facility in May 2025 where it underwent nose-to-tail overhaul. It has already rejoined operations as of 17 March after receiving the Airworthiness Review Certificate (ARC). This marked the end of the restoration programme for 30 grounded aircraft after the Tata Group took over the airline in 2022.

=== Legacy fleet retrofit programme ===
Air India has initiated a $400 million refit program for its legacy aircraft fleet. On 16 September 2024, the first phase of the refit began, in which 27 older A320neo and 40 Boeing widebody aircraft will be retrofitted with new seats, cabin and livery. VT-EXN, an A320neo, became the first to be retrofitted. The aircraft was supposed to be delivered and enter service in December 2024 after its prototyping phase and certification. The rest of the 27 narrowbody aircraft's upgradation and modernisation was planned to continue at the rate of 3 to 4 aircraft per month.

As of March 2025, the first retrofitted legacy narrowbody aircraft, VT-EXN, had returned to the operational fleet, while the rest of the 26 legacy narrowbody fleet would complete the retrofit by the 3rd quarter of the year. The first of the legacy widebody aircraft, a Boeing 787, was planned to be sent for retrofitting by April 2025, followed by a Boeing 777 later in 2026, with the entire program expected to be completed by mid-2027.

As per a press release on 10 August 2025, the first of the airline's Boeing 787-8, registered as VT-ANT, had been ferried to Boeing’s Modification Center in Victorville, California in July. The aircraft was joined by another 787-8 in October, following which both aircraft was expected to return to active service in December 2025. According to the current schedule, the entire 787 fleet will complete its retrofit programme by mid-2027. These 787-8 aircraft would receive a new three-class configuration, along with upgraded avionics and other critical components, as part of a reliability enhancement initiative. Seven of these aircraft will also undergo "heavy, scheduled maintenance (D-checks)" in parallel. On 13 April 2026, the first retrofitted 787-8, VT-ANT, arrived in Delhi. The aircraft was painted in an FAA Part-145 certified aircraft paint facility, AeroPro, San Bernardino, California.

Further, the retrofit programme of the 27 narrow-body A320neo was also proceeding as planned, with project completion in September 2025. The programme was fast-tracked after the addition of a third line in GMR's MRO facility in Hyderabad airport. However, the retrofitting of the Boeing 777 fleet had once again been pushed back, now scheduled to take place between early 2027 and October 2028. This delay is attributed to supply chain issues due to COVID pandemic.

On 31 October 2025, Air India announced the completion of the first phase of its retrofit programme with the introduction of the final legacy A320neo following the interior upgrades. The airline was operating 104 aircraft of the A320 Family, which is either new or upgraded interior cabins. Further, the retrofit of 13 legacy A321 aircraft will commence from 2026.

== Former fleet ==
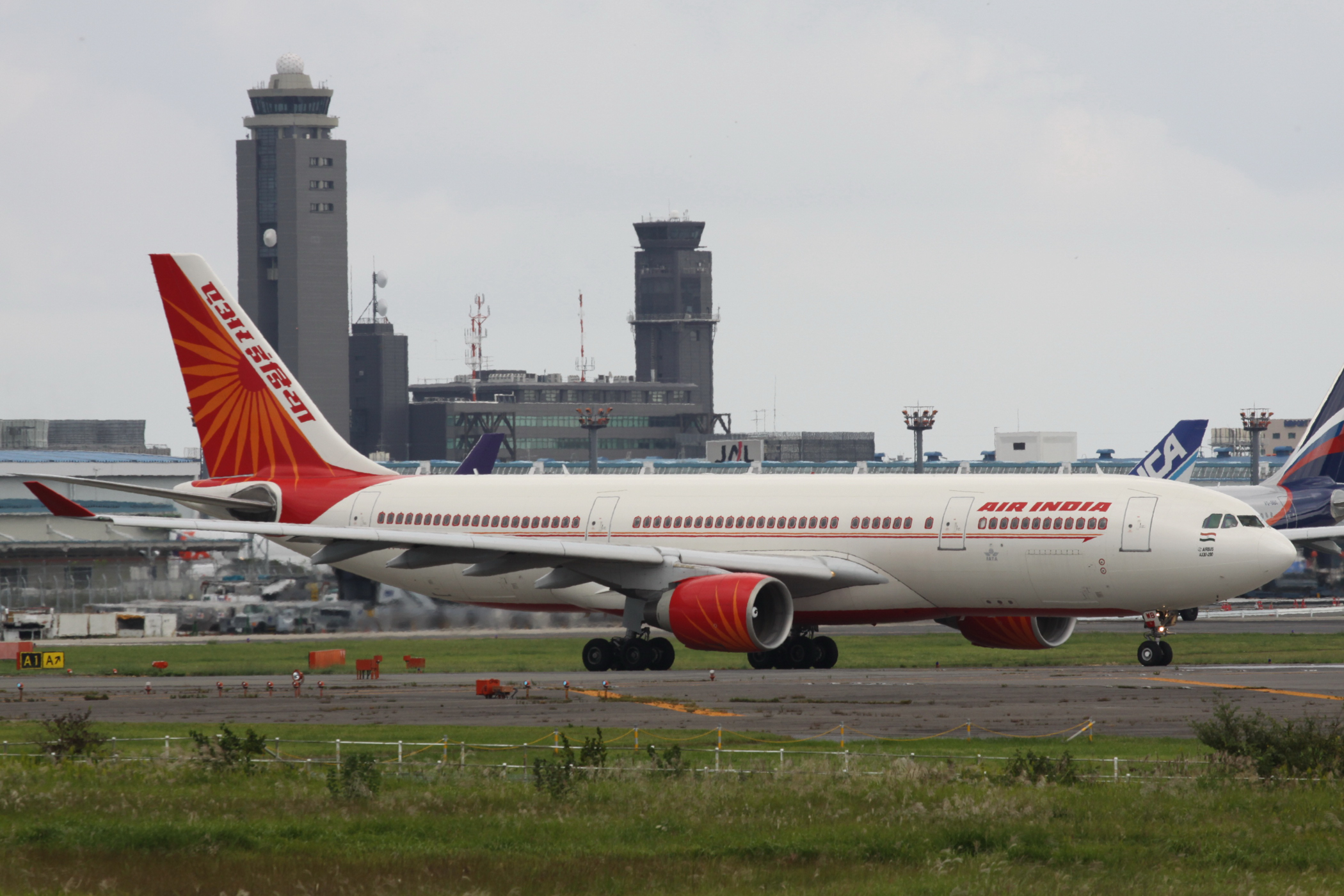
Airbus A330-200

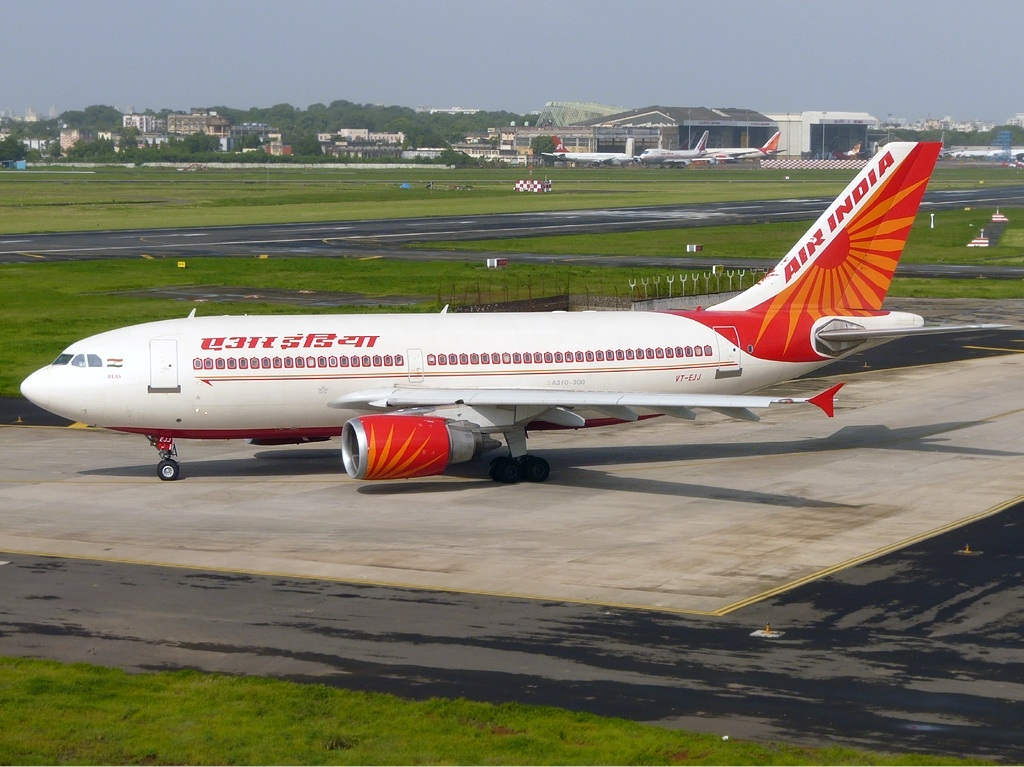
Airbus A310-300

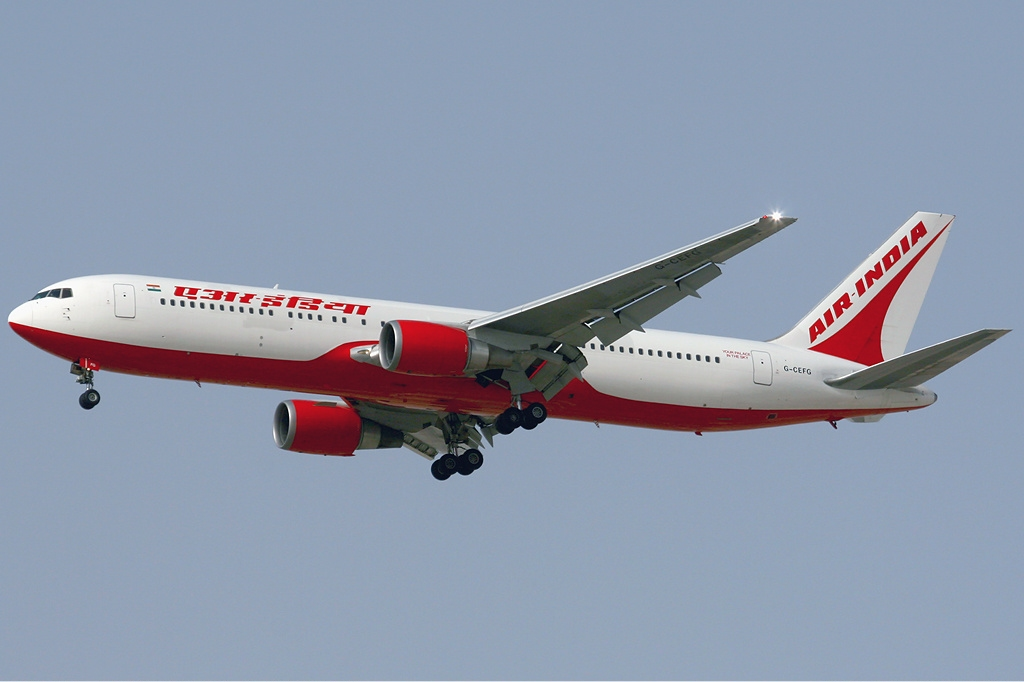
Boeing 767-300ER

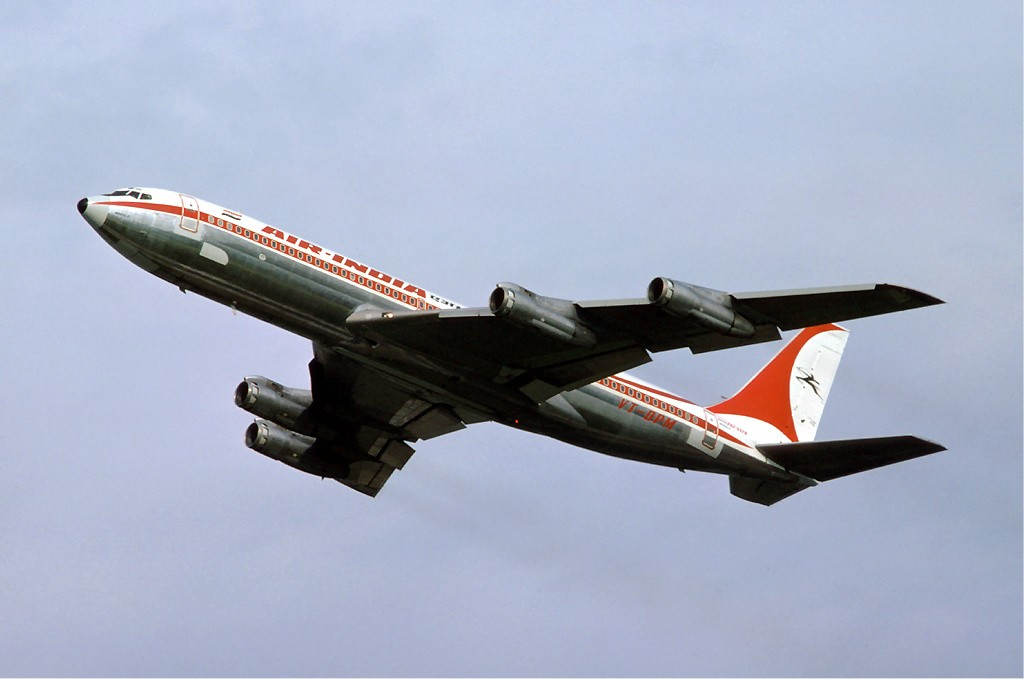
Boeing 707-420C in 1976

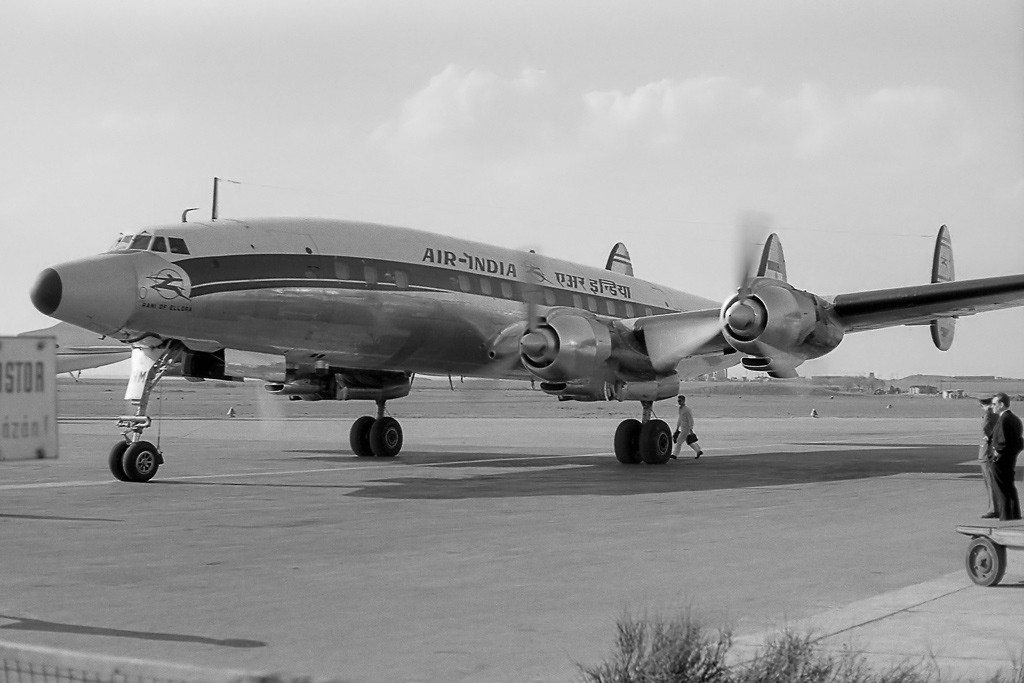
Lockheed Super Constellation in 1961 at Prague Ruzyně Airport

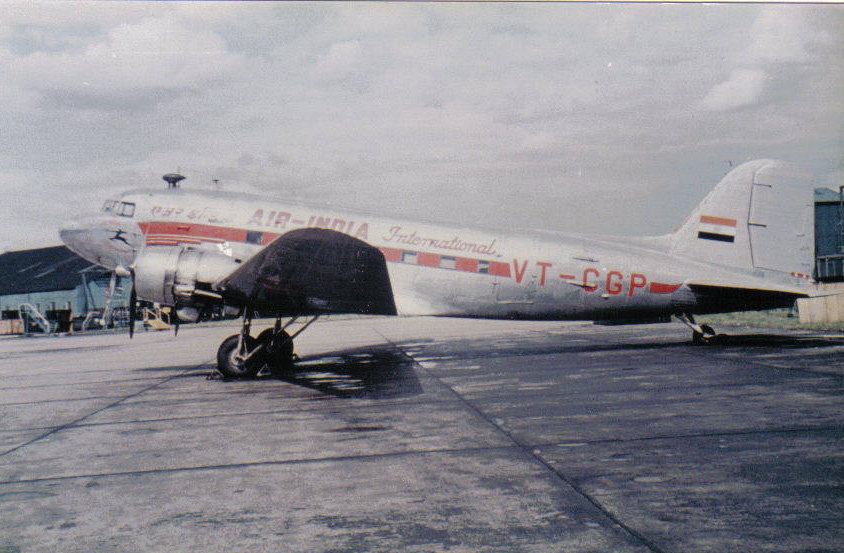
Douglas DC-3 at Heathrow Airport in 1958

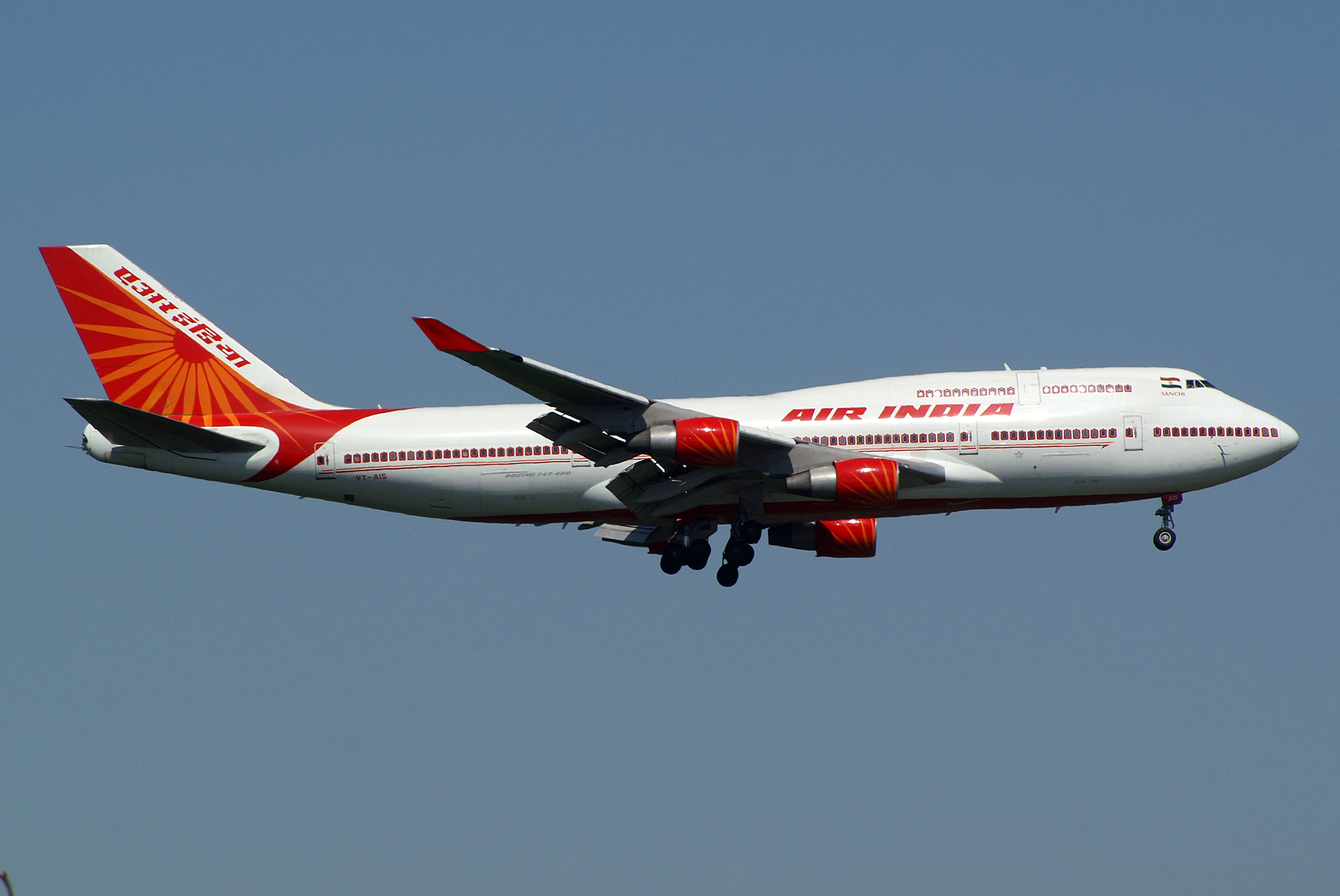
Boeing 747-400

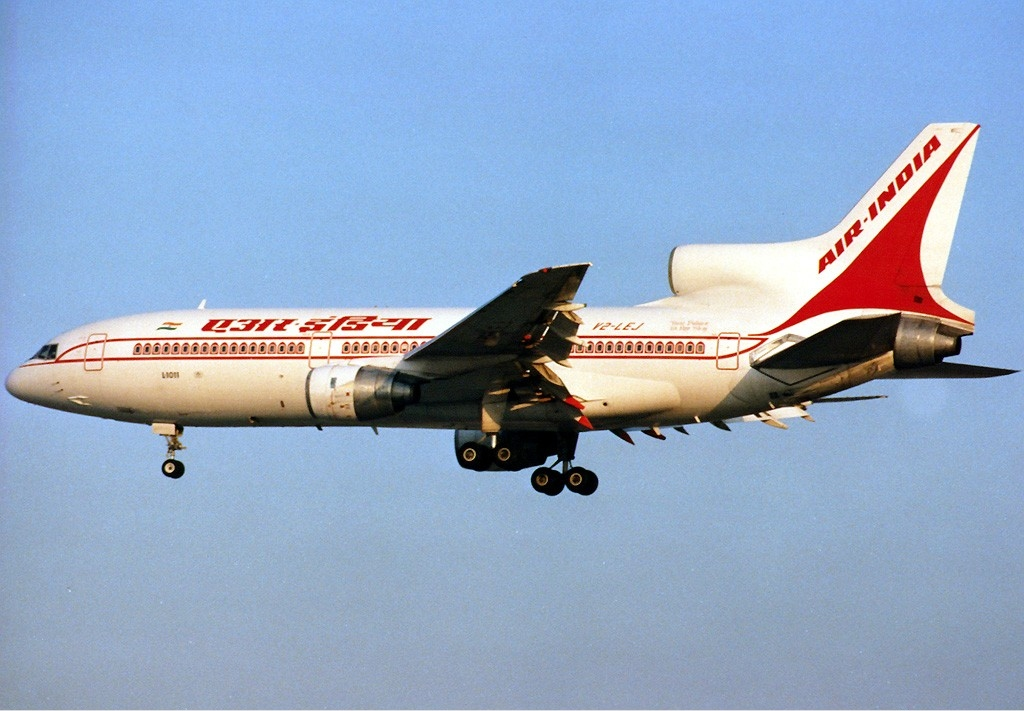
Lockheed L-1011 TriStar

Past aircraft operated by Air India
Aircraft	Total	Introduced	Retired	Replacement	Notes
Airbus A300B4-100	1	1994	1994	Airbus A321	
Airbus A300B4-200	3	1982	2002	Airbus A321	
Airbus A310-300	28	1986	2016	Boeing 787-8	Some converted to Cargo use for Air India Cargo
Airbus A319-100	17	2009	2024	Airbus A320neo	
Airbus A319-100	1	2009	2021	Airbus A320neo	Transferred to DRDO as a testbed aircraft
Airbus A320-200	38	2007	2019	Airbus A320neo	
Airbus A320-200	5	2015	2025	None	Transferred to Air India Express
Airbus A320neo	15	2024	2026	None	Transferred to Air India Express
Airbus A321-200	1	2007	2019	Airbus A321neo	
Airbus A321-200	6	2007	2022	Airbus A321neo	To be used in the AEW&C Mk II project for the Indian Air Force
Airbus A321neo	4	2023	2025	None	Transferred to Air India Express
Airbus A330-200	2	2008	2015	Boeing 787-8	
Boeing 707-320B	3	1962	1989	Boeing 747-200; Boeing 747-300M	
Boeing 707-320C	2	1964	1990	Airbus A310-300; Boeing 747-200; Boeing 747-300M	
Boeing 707-400	4	1960	1984	Airbus A310-300; Boeing 747-200	
Boeing 707-400	1	1960	1966	None	Crashed as Flight 101
Boeing 707-400	1	1960	1982	None	Crashed as Flight 403
Boeing 737-200	5	2007	2011	Airbus A320	
Boeing 747-200B	11	1971	2004	Boeing 747-400; Boeing 777-200; Boeing 777-200ER	
Boeing 747-200B	1	1971	1978	None	Crashed as Flight 855
Boeing 747-200B	1	1971	1985	None	Destroyed by a bomb as Flight 182
Boeing 747-200B	1	1986	1988	Boeing 747-300M	Leased from Evergreen International
Boeing 747-300	1	2005	2007	Boeing 777-300ER	Leased from Air Atlanta Icelandic
Boeing 747-300M	2	1988	2008	Boeing 777-300ER	
Boeing 747-400M	1	2005	2008	Boeing 777-300ER	Purchased used from Air Canada, sold to Dubai Royal Air Wing
Boeing 747-400	13	1993	2024	Airbus A350-900; Boeing 777-200LR; Boeing 777-300ER	Last 4 were deregistered in 2022, and sold to AerSale in April 2024. VT-ESM written off in September 2009 at BOM due to fire. VT-EVA, reregistered as N940AS, preserved at Roswell International Air Center, New Mexico. 2 aircraft used as Air India One for the President, Vice-president or Prime Minister of India.
Boeing 757-200	1	2007	2007	None	
Boeing 767-300ER	2	2006	2008	None	
Boeing 767-300ER	1	2007	2007	None	
Boeing 777-200	1	2006	2010	Boeing 777-200LR; Boeing 777-300ER	Leased from United Airlines
Boeing 777-200ER	3	2005	2011	Boeing 777-200LR; Boeing 777-300ER	Leased from United Airlines
Boeing 777-200LR	5	2008	2014	None	Sold to Etihad Airways
Boeing 777-200LR	3	2009	2025	Airbus A350-900; Boeing 777-300ER	
Boeing 777-200LR	5	2022	2026	Airbus A350-900; Boeing 777-300ER	Returned to lessor
Boeing 777-300ER	2	2018	2020	None	Acquired by Indian Air Force for Air India One for the President, Vice-president or Prime Minister of India
Boeing 787-8	1	2014	2025	None	VT-ANB crashed as Flight 171
Boeing 787-9	1	2024	2025	None	
De Havilland Comet	Unknown	1950s	1950s	None	
De Havilland Dragon Rapide	Unknown	1930s	1940s	None	
De Havilland Fox Moth	Unknown	1930s	1930s	None	
De Havilland Puss Moth	Unknown	1929	1932	None	
Douglas DC-2	15	1934	1940	Douglas DC-3	
Douglas DC-3	Unknown	1936	1970s	Douglas DC-4	
Douglas DC-4	Unknown	1948	Unknown	None	
Douglas DC-8-60F	15	1977	1988	Airbus A310-300; Boeing 747-200	
Douglas DC-8-70F	15	1983	1995	Airbus A310-300; Boeing 747-200	
Ilyushin Il-62M	Unknown	1989	1990	Airbus A310	
Lockheed L-1011 TriStar	2	1995	1996	Airbus A310-300	
Lockheed L-749 Constellation	4	1948	1962	Boeing 707	Transferred to Indian Airlines and Indian Air Force
Lockheed L-749 Constellation	1	1948	1950	None	Crashed as Flight 245
Lockheed L-749 Constellation	1	1948	1955	None	Destroyed by a bomb as Flight 300
Lockheed L-1049 Super Constellation	10	1956	1962	Boeing 707	Transferred to Indian Airlines and Indian Air Force
Percival Petrel	Unknown	1930s	1930s	None	
Vickers VC.1 Viking	9	1947	1960s	None	
Waco YQC-6	Unknown	1939	Unknown	None	
