= Jetstream Express =

Airlines

| IATA | ICAO | Call sign |
|---|---|---|
| JX (revoked) | JXT | VANNIN |
- Founded: 2006
- Commenced operations: 2006
- Ceased operations: June 2007
- Hubs: Blackpool International Airport
- Focus cities: Aberdeen Airport, Belfast City Airport, Southampton Airport
- Fleet size: 0 (peak: 4)
- Destinations: 0 (peak: 3)
- Headquarters: Blackpool International Airport, England, United Kingdom
- Website: www.jetstreamexpress.com

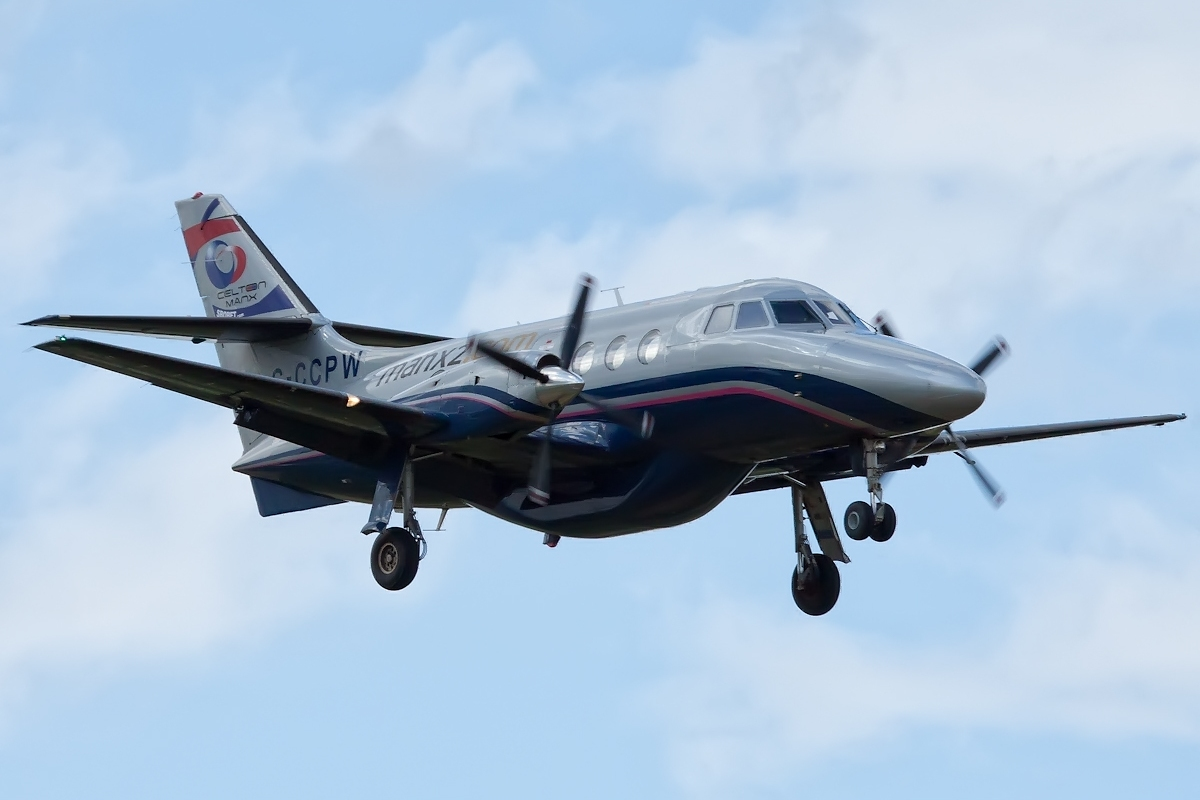
BAe Jetstream 31

Jetstream Express is small regional British airline based at Blackpool International Airport.

Jetstream Express was the trading name of Jetstream Executive Travel Ltd. scheduled operations. The airline began flights on 8 May 2007 with several flights per week from Blackpool International Airport to Belfast City airport (ten flights each week), Southampton Airport, aimed at both business and leisure travellers. Flights to Aberdeen started on 4 June with five flights each week. Flights to Southampton were due to start on 2 July 2007.

The fleet consisted of four BAe Jetstream 31 (J31).

In June 2007 a notice appeared in the company website stating "With immediate effect, Jetstream Express have ceased operating the routes to Blackpool, Aberdeen, Southampton and Belfast", adding that all flights were withdrawn as the routes have not proved viable.

== See also ==
- List of defunct airlines of the United Kingdom
