= Fly Safe Aviation =

Airline

IATA	ICAO	Call sign
–	–	–
- Founded: 4 December 1997; 28 years ago
- Commenced operations: 2004; 22 years ago
- AOC #: 09/2004
- Operating bases: Indira Gandhi International Airport (New Delhi)
- Fleet size: 6
- Key people: Rajesh Bhatia (Director)
- Website: http://www.indiaflysafe.com

India Fly Safe Aviation is an Indian charter airline based in New Delhi.

== History ==
The airline was established in late 1997 as Shri Venkatesh Aviation after the Open Skies policy was adopted in 1991. The airline currently offers charter services to both domestic and international destinations using jet and propeller aircraft.

== Fleet ==
The airline operates the following aircraft as of June 2018:

India Fly Safe Aviation fleet
Aircraft	In fleet	Passengers	Notes
ERJ-135	1	37	VT-JSI
Global 6000	1	6	VT-JSY
AgustaWestland AW139	1	12	VT-JSA
AgustaWestland AW109S Grand	1	6	VT-JSF
Bell 429 GlobalRanger	1	6	VT-JSH
Cessna 208-B	1	9	VT-JIN
Total	6		
