= Air Kerala =

Proposed airline based in South India

- Founded: February 2006; 20 years ago
- Parent company: Cochin International Airport Limited
- Headquarters: Kochi
- Website: www.airkerala.com

Air Kerala is a proposed ultra-low-cost regional airline project, promoted by the Government of Kerala, registered as a subsidiary of the Cochin International Airport Limited (CIAL). In March 2015, the board of directors of the airline decided to defer the start of commercial operations until a clear picture of relevant government rules emerged.

The airline had initially planned to commence operations in April 2013, however, the Indian government's stipulation, that an Indian airline seeking to operate international air services should first have a fleet of at least 20 aircraft and a five-year experience in operating domestic services, had put the project on the backburner.

Air Kerala was to be India's first airline with a State government as one of the primary stakeholders. The State government, CIAL and other public sector companies were together to hold 26% of the shares of the company, while the remaining 74% were to be issued to individuals and private groups.

In July 2024, UAE-based businessman Afi Ahmed announced plans to use the Air Kerala domain name, which he owns, to market scheduled commuter air transport services in the state of Kerala.

== History ==
The project was first proposed in 2005 during the Chief Ministership of Oommen Chandy and Air Kerala International Services was registered as a fully owned subsidiary of Cochin International Airport in February 2006. However the proposal went to cold storage, after the ruling UDF government stepped down in 2006. On returning to power in 2011, the UDF government decided to revive the project. The hardship faced by the Non-resident Keralites, due to high airfares and frequent cancellation of flights between Kerala and the Gulf countries, led to the revival of the Air Kerala proposal. The project has evoked good interest from the various Malayali businessmen and Non-resident Keralites in the Middle East.

== Business plan ==
The primary objective of the airline was to eventually operate international flights to the Middle East, where around 2.5 million Keralites are employed. The airline would follow the model of Cochin International Airport Limited (CIAL), which is India's first PPP airport.

Air Kerala planned to raise ₹ 200 crore through equity as initial capital. While 26% of shares were to be held by the state government, CIAL and public sector undertakings, the remaining 74% would be held by shareholders. The state government and CIAL would fund ₹ 50 crore each while ₹ 100 crore would be mobilized from the public as shares. Each share was valued at ₹ 10,000 and it was expected that at least 200,000 Keralites would invest in the project. Consultancy firm Ernst & Young, that conducted a study in 2006, is now preparing the Detailed Project Report for the government.

== Hurdles ==
The proposal of starting the airline was first floated in 2006. But the central government rejected the proposal, as it did not meet the criteria for operating international services. The Government of Kerala sought speedy approval from the MoCA for launching Air Kerala. The government also sought exemptions on the MoCA regulatory norms, that require airline companies at least five years experience in domestic flight operations and a minimum fleet size of 20 aircraft, to start international flight services. The state government cited the exemption given by the central government to Air India when it launched its subsidiary, Air India Express.

== Timeline ==
Air Kerala was expected to submit formal application in November 2012 before the Directorate General of Civil Aviation (India) (DGCA) for getting the no objection certificate for services, as stated by the Minister for Fisheries, Port and Excise, Shri. K. Babu, who is also a member of the director board of Air Kerala.

=== 2014 ===
In February 2014, former Kerala Chief Minister Oommen Chandy indicated that the central government's requirements for initiating international airline operations had stalled the project's progress. He affirmed his administration's commitment to pursuing the initiative if these prerequisites were relaxed. Subsequently, in December 2014, the Board of Directors opted to commence domestic operations instead. Negotiations commenced to lease a 15-seater aircraft for service between the state's three airports. However, the plan shifted towards acquiring an aircraft with a five-hour non-stop flight capability. This aimed to expedite the accumulation of the minimum domestic flying credits mandated.

=== March 2015 ===
In March 2015, the airline's board of directors opted to postpone the launch of commercial operations pending clarification regarding the proposed amendments to the '5/20' rule. As of 2017, the rule has been revised to the 0/20 format. As per the new guidelines, any airline with 20 aircraft or that keeps aside 20 percent of their fleet exclusively for domestic sectors can fly abroad. The five-year domestic flying experience has been revoked.

== Zettfly Aviation ==
In April 2023, UAE-based Keralite businessman Afi Ahmed acquired the domain name airkerala.com and expressed his willingness to collaborate with the government on the Air Kerala project. Mr Ahmed offered to donate the domain and lend his full support if the government decides to revive the initiative. However, the Government of Kerala and Cochin International Airport Limited (the company which owned the trademark name (of AIR KERALA)) expressed that the plan of operating an airline has not been shelved. The viability of collaborating with a private operator for this purpose has not been contemplated, as it involves decision-making at the policy level.

In July 2024, Afi Ahmed's private company, Zettfly Aviation, announced that they had received a No Objection Certificate (NOC) from the Ministry of Civil Aviation to operate scheduled commuter air transport services for three years. Zettfly will use Ahmed's Air Kerala domain name to market its services. It would be the first regional airline to be based in Kerala. Zettfly is working to obtain an Air Operator's Certificate (AOC) and will start operations with three ATR 72-600 aircraft Being set up as an "ultra-low-cost airline", Ahmed plans to start with three ATR 72-600 aircraft aiming for six aircraft by mid-2026 and eventually reaching 20 aircraft for international expansion.

Zettfly named C. S. Randhawa, a veteran pilot with nearly 50 years of experience, as Vice President of Operations to help prepare for the airline's launch. Ashutosh Vashishth, a former army officer and aviation security expert, was appointed Vice President of Security. Harish Kutty was appointed the airline's Chief Executive Officer.

Zettfly will initially target tier-2 and tier-3 airports across South and Central India to cater to Kerala's large expatriate community and domestic travellers. It will connect major cities like Delhi, Mumbai, Bengaluru, Chennai and Hyderabad, while also focusing on underserved tier-2 cities. Upon securing international route permissions, Zettfly plans to prioritize high-demand routes to the Middle East, including destinations such as Abu Dhabi and Dubai in the UAE, Riyadh and Jeddah in Saudi Arabia, and Qatar. Subsequently, the airline intends to expand its network to Southeast Asian countries, such as Thailand, Vietnam, and Malaysia.
