= 2025 IndiGo scheduling crisis =

2025 flight operations disruption

- Date: 2–9 December 2025
- Location: India
- Type: Flight cancellations
- Cause: Failure to adjust schedule to new crew worktime and rest rules
- Perpetrator: IndiGo
- Outcome: 4,500 flights canceled as of 12 December

In December 2025, IndiGo, India's largest airline, experienced a scheduling crisis, which led to the cancellation of thousands of flights. The issue arose after its failure to adjust to the new flight crew time limitations mandated by the Directorate General of Civil Aviation (DGCA) of the Government of India. The crisis started on 2 December and the airline, which had a domestic market share of more than 60%, cancelled nearly 4,500 flights over the following ten days and affected over 10 lakh passengers in total costing the airlines over ₹24 crore towards compensation.

In response, the DGCA relaxed some of the rules, and gave IndiGo a temporary exemption from them till 10 February 2026. It also placed caps on airfares, and ordered IndiGo to complete all pending refunds for the disruption. The Ministry of Civil Aviation ordered an inquiry into the incident, and sent a show cause notice to the airline. During the disruptions, the DGCA kept IndiGo under unusually strict scrutiny, with aviation authorities stationed in airports to monitor customer handling and in IndiGo operations control center for real time monitoring, as well as requiring hourly flight data and weekly operational reports. In the resulting investigation, DGCA imposed a fine of ₹22.2 crore for the incidents, directed IndiGo to a bank guarantee of ₹50 crore to ensure smooth operations as well as to oversee reforms in suggested areas over the period of 15 months, and also warnings to various authorities including terminations of employment for some involved.

On 11 February, following rollback of temporary exemptions placed by DGCA on the airlines, IndiGo was reported to be operating under compliance with the new FDTL rules.

== Background ==
IndiGo was India's largest airline with nearly 64.2% market share in August 2025, and had an on-time performance of 90.2%, the best of any airline in India. It also had a cancellation rate of 0.51% in October 2025, the lowest amongst the large Indian airlines. IndiGo's market share was at its peak, increasing due to the failure of competitors such as Jet Airways and GoAir over the previous few years, and was one of the highest compared to other major aviation markets.

In June 2024, the Directorate General of Civil Aviation (DGCA) of the Government of India announced new Flight Duty Time Limitation (FDTL) rules, which increased pilot rest periods and reduced night time work. IndiGo and other major airlines pushed back on the changes, delaying its implementation until 2025. The first phase of the rules were implemented effective July, and the second phase was scheduled to be implemented from 1 November. Earlier, the DGCA had approved a winter schedule of 15,014 weekly departures for IndiGo, which was a six percent increase from the summer schedule of the same year and nearly ten percent increase compared to the previous winter. The approval was given based on an estimated aircraft availability of 403 against 351 in the summer while the airlines was able to operate only 339 aircraft in October and 344 in November.

The new rules limited the night landing for the crew from six to two per week, which led to operational issues for IndiGo. It had reported 1,232 flight cancellations in November, 755 of which were due to crew and FDTL-related constraints, and the failure incidents dropped the on time performance of the airline from 84.1% in October, to 67.7% in November.

== Crisis ==
The crisis began on 2 December when an increasing number of flights were cancelled, and peaked at roughly 1,600 cancellations on a 5 December. The crisis severely interrupted domestic flight operations in India as the disruption coincided with India's peak wedding season during the winter months. IndiGo estimated that normal operations would be restored between 10 and 15 December. Cancellations started to taper off on 8 December, though they continued throughout the week. Data revealed by DGCA suggests that over 10 lakh passengers were affected by the disruptions overall costing the airline over ₹24 crore in spending towards compensation.

IndiGo flight statistics
Date	Flights cancelled	On-time Performance
October		84.1%
November	1,232 total	67.7%
1 December		49.5%
2 December		35%
3 December	200+	19.7%
4 December	550	8.5%
5 December	~1600	
6 December	~800	
7 December	650	
8 December	650	
9 December	~400	

== Response ==
On 3 December, IndiGo issued an apology and intimated that it has initiated temporary schedule adjustments to stabilise operations over the next two days. On 5 December, DGCA granted IndiGo a temporary exemption from some of the new FDTL rules, notably, the night duty rules and leave-for-rest norm. The exemption was extended until 10 February, with a periodic review of crew utilisation every 15 days and a mandate for IndiGo to share a roadmap to full compliance. However, the move was criticised by pilot unions as compromising on the safety of flights. On the same day, the Ministry of Civil Aviation set up a hotline to assist passengers affected by the service disruption and ordered a high-level inquiry into the incident. The Indian Railways added 116 extra coaches across 37 trains to cater to the additional demand.

On 6 December, IndiGo promised full refunds for those affected by cancellations, and the DGCA ordered the airline to complete all pending refunds for the disruption by the next day as well as granting the airlines temporary exemption from some of the FDTL until February 10, 2026. During the period, DGCA reported that the organization was kept under unusually close scrutiny, having IndiGo share hourly flight data, weekly and fortnightly operational reports, and aviation officials stationed at operating airports to oversee passenger handling and in IndiGo operations control center for real-time monitoring. IndiGo estimated that it would have to refund ₹5 billion (US$52 million) to customers as a result of the disruptions. IndiGo has since offered ₹10,000 "Gesture of Care" voucher for users affected by mass flight cancellations or delays greater than 3 hours from 3–5 December, valid for 12 months. As fares rose on other airlines in response to the disruptions, the union government placed price caps on the airfare. These price caps remained in effect until 23 March 2026, when the government determined that the "situation has since stabilised" and airlines advocated their lifting in response to higher jet fuel and other expenses due to the 2026 Iran war. The DCGA sent a show cause notice to IndiGo asking for a response within 24 hours, pending regulatory action to be taken against the airline. On 9 December, the DGCA ordered five percent cuts on IndiGo flight schedule that was later amended to ten percent by the ministry of civil aviation due to IndiGo's inability to conduct flight operations efficiently.

On 11 December, the DCGA issued an order to terminate the employment of four contracted inspectors of flight operations and return them to their parent organizations, after questions were raised in the media about the DGCA's oversight, including whether it had adequately assessed IndiGo's pilot strength before approving an increase in flights in the winter schedule and the airline's preparedness to comply with revised pilot duty and rest norms. As part of its inquiry, the DGCA summoned Pieter Elbers, the CEO of IndiGo on 12 December, to seek explanation regarding the restoration of flight operations, recruitment of additional pilots, and the process for issuing refunds and compensation to affected passengers.

The DGCA imposed a ₹22.2 crore (roughly US$2.45 million) fine for the flight disruptions, the highest the agency has ever levied. Its investigation found over-optimization of operations and inadequacies in management and operations, for which it issued warnings to CEO, COO, Deputy Head–Flight Operations, AVP–Crew Resource Planning, and Director–Flight Operations as well as directions for relief of Senior Vice President from his role.

The airlines has operated in compliance with the new FDTL rules since 11 February 2026, with 10% less flights approved by the DGCA than compared to same time of last year. It has been ordered to pledge bank guarantee of ₹50 crore to DGCA subject to DGCA-verified implementation of reforms in leadership and governance, manpower planning, rostering, fatigue risk management, digital systems and operational resilience and finally a board-level oversight with sustained compliance, over a varying time-frame within the following 15 months.

== Causes ==
While IndiGo's failure to adjust to the FDTL rules was the major reason behind the crisis, the airline cited technology issues (such as the A320 software update), seasonal schedule realignment, airport congestion, and adverse weather conditions as other reasons behind the disruptions. In response to the disruptions, the Federation of Indian Pilots pointed out that other airlines had adapted to the rule without any major impact on the services and that IndiGo's challenges stemmed from "years of lean manpower planning" and delayed hiring, non-poaching arrangements and other short-sighted planning practices. IndiGo had seen a slower growth of pilot strength relative to the expansion of its fleet, with 1,247 pilots added for 91 additional aircraft between 2022 and 2024, compared to the addition of 1,420 pilots corresponding to 61 added aircraft for Air India in the same time period.

An inquiry committee formed under DGCA concluded that the primary cause of the disruptions were "over-optimization of operations, inadequate regulatory preparedness along with deficiencies in system software support and shortcomings in management structure and operational control". It also noted that flight rosters were used to maximize utilization of crew members, aircraft and network resources with increased reliance on dead-heading, tail swaps, extended duty patterns, and minimal recovery margins.

== Reactions ==
Elbers made a public apology on social media acknowledging the severe disruptions and promised a return to function of normalisation of services. Additionally, the airline stated that its board had set up a crisis management group to address the issue. K. Rammohan Naidu, the minister of civil aviation, said in the Indian Parliament that the government will initiate appropriate action against IndiGo for the crisis, and blamed the chaos on poor crew-roster management rather than technical glitches. He said that this was not just about punishing one airline, but about setting an example for the entire civil-aviation sector.

Public commentators saw IndiGo's market dominance as an exacerbating factor, with Air Deccan founder G. R. Gopinath critiquing the duopoly between IndiGo and Air India in the airline industry and stating the former would possibly be unable to recover from the crisis. Rahul Gandhi, the leader of opposition in Lok Sabha, claimed that the crisis represented a failure of the government and called for "fair competition in every sector, not match-fixing monopolies". Naidu responded that the government "has always aimed to increase competition" and that the disruption were not a political but rather a public issue. Shashi Tharoor decried the lack of responsibility taken by and poor response from IndiGo and civil aviation authorities as well as profiteering in the aviation market during the disruptions.

The IndiGo stock shed almost ₹400 billion (US$4.2 billion) in market value from 2 to 9 December, leading to a 15% decrease in market value. However, BofA securities and Goldman Sachs maintained a 'buy' position with the former estimating a nine percent cut to the quarterly net income and the later expecting the stock to remain volatile but stable due to its dominant market position, low cost structure, and expanding demand in India. Meanwhile, Moody's downgraded IndiGo's human capital issuer score from three to four, terming the disruptions as "credit negative" for IndiGo but adding that fundamentals of its Baa3 rating remain strong, including its leading market share and healthy demand for air travel in India, predicting IndiGo's long-term leverage to be sustainable. Jeffries removed IndiGo from its India model portfolio for 2026.
