= North East Shuttles =

IATA	ICAO	Call sign
—	NSL	NORTH EAST
- Founded: 2006
- Commenced operations: 2011
- Ceased operations: 2019
- Operating bases: Lengpui Airport, Aizawl
- Fleet size: 0
- Destinations: 0
- Headquarters: Kolkata
- Key people: Shoba Kikakara Mani (director), Uma Sankar Roy (additional director)

North East Shuttles was an Indian charter airline based in the city of Kolkata, West Bengal. It was founded in 2006 and began operations in 2011 with two aircraft to serve regional routes in the North East, West Bengal and Jharkhand. The airline had planned to expand to Uttar Pradesh, but operations never began. By July 2019, the airline had ceased operations.

== Destinations ==
North East Shuttles is non-operational.

== Fleet ==
North East Shuttles operated the following aircraft:

North East Shuttles fleet
Aircraft	In service	Orders	Passengers	Notes
Aircraft	In service	Orders	Y	Notes
Cessna 208 Caravan	0	—		Registered VT-NES.
Dornier DO 228	0	—		
Total	0	—		

== Accidents and incidents ==
On 4 May 2011, a Cessna Grand Caravan of the airline overshot the runway at Lengpui airport during landing in foggy weather. No passengers or crew members were injured and the aircraft was later repaired and returned to service.

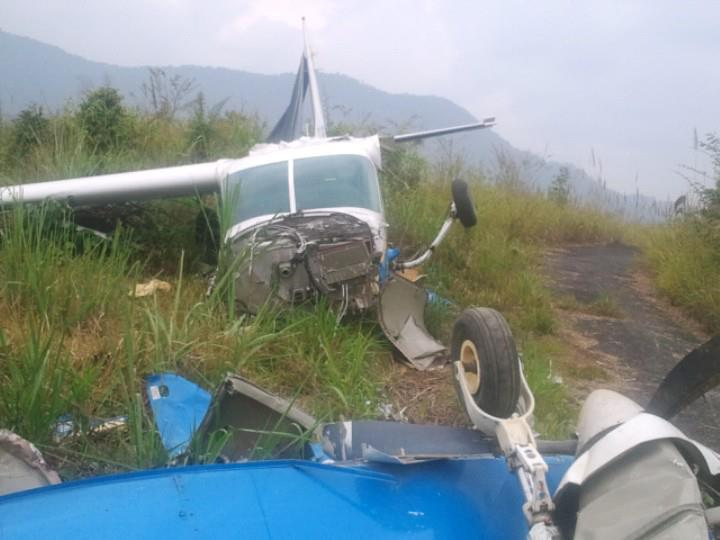
The aircraft after overshooting the runway

== Sponsorship ==
In July 2018 it was announced that North East Shuttles had agreed to become the co-sponsor of National Club of India Mohun Bagan. The sponsorship deal was worth a sum of ₹ 30 million (₹ 3 crore).
