= List of airports in Telangana =

The Indian state of Telangana has one commercial airport which has access to international flights along with some non-used airstrips for emergency purposes.

Rajiv Gandhi International Airport under the governance of Airports Authority of India is the only airport in state of Telangana with connections to domestic and international destinations.

== Classification ==
This list contains the following information:

1. Area served – Town or city where the airport is located. This may not always be an exact location as some airports are situated in the periphery of the town/city they serve.
2. IATA – The three letter airport code assigned by the International Air Transport Association
3. ICAO – The four letter airport code assigned by the International Civil Aviation Organization. ICAO codes for Andhra Pradesh start with VO [South Zone - Chennai Center].
4. Owned/operated – Authority owning or operating the airport
5. Airport type – Type of airport, including the terminology used by Airports Authority of India, as per the table below:

Airport Type	Description
International	Airport which handles both international and domestic traffic
International (CE)	A civil enclave airport primarily used by Indian Armed Forces but has separate commercial terminal(s) to handle international and domestic traffic
Customs	Airport with customs checking and clearance facility and handles domestic traffic throughout the year. A very limited number of international flights also operate from some of these customs airports for a limited period of time.
Domestic	Airport which handles only domestic traffic
Domestic (CE)	A civil enclave airport primarily used by Indian Armed Forces but has separate commercial terminal(s) to handle domestic traffic
Airstrip	A strip of ground set aside for the take-off and landing of aircraft
Private	An airport, airfield or airstrip owned by individuals, trusts and corporations; for private use only
Flying school	An airfield or an airstrip used to train commercial pilots

Functional status of the airport, as per the table below:

Functional status	Description
Operational	Implies airport has active commercial service for public use airports
Non-operational	Implies airport currently has no active commercial service but had or will have commercial service
Closed	Implies airport can no longer be operational for commercial service
Proposed/under construction	Implies airport is proposed or under construction

== List ==
List of airports in Telangana
Area served	Location	Name	IATA	ICAO	Type	Functional status	Owned/operated
Dundigal	Dundigal	Dundigal Air Force Academy	–	VODG	Flying school	Operational	Indian Air Force
Hakimpet	Hakimpet	Hakimpet Air Force Station	–	VOHK	Flying school	Operational	Indian Air Force
Hyderabad	Begumpet	Begumpet Airport	BPM	VOHY	International	Closed	AAI
Hyderabad	Shamshabad	Rajiv Gandhi International Airport	HYD	VOHS	International	Operational	AAI; GMR Group
Nadergul	Nadirgul	Nadirgul Airfield	–	–	Flying school	Closed	AAI
Ramagundam	Ramagundam	Ramagundam Airport	RMD	VORD	Domestic	Non-operational	AAI
Warangal	Warangal	Warangal Airport	WGC	VOWA	Domestic	Under Construction	AAI

== See also ==
- List of airports in India
- List of Indian Air Force stations
