= List of surviving de Havilland Vampires =

This is a list of surviving de Havilland Vampires and variant aircraft.

== Aircraft on display ==
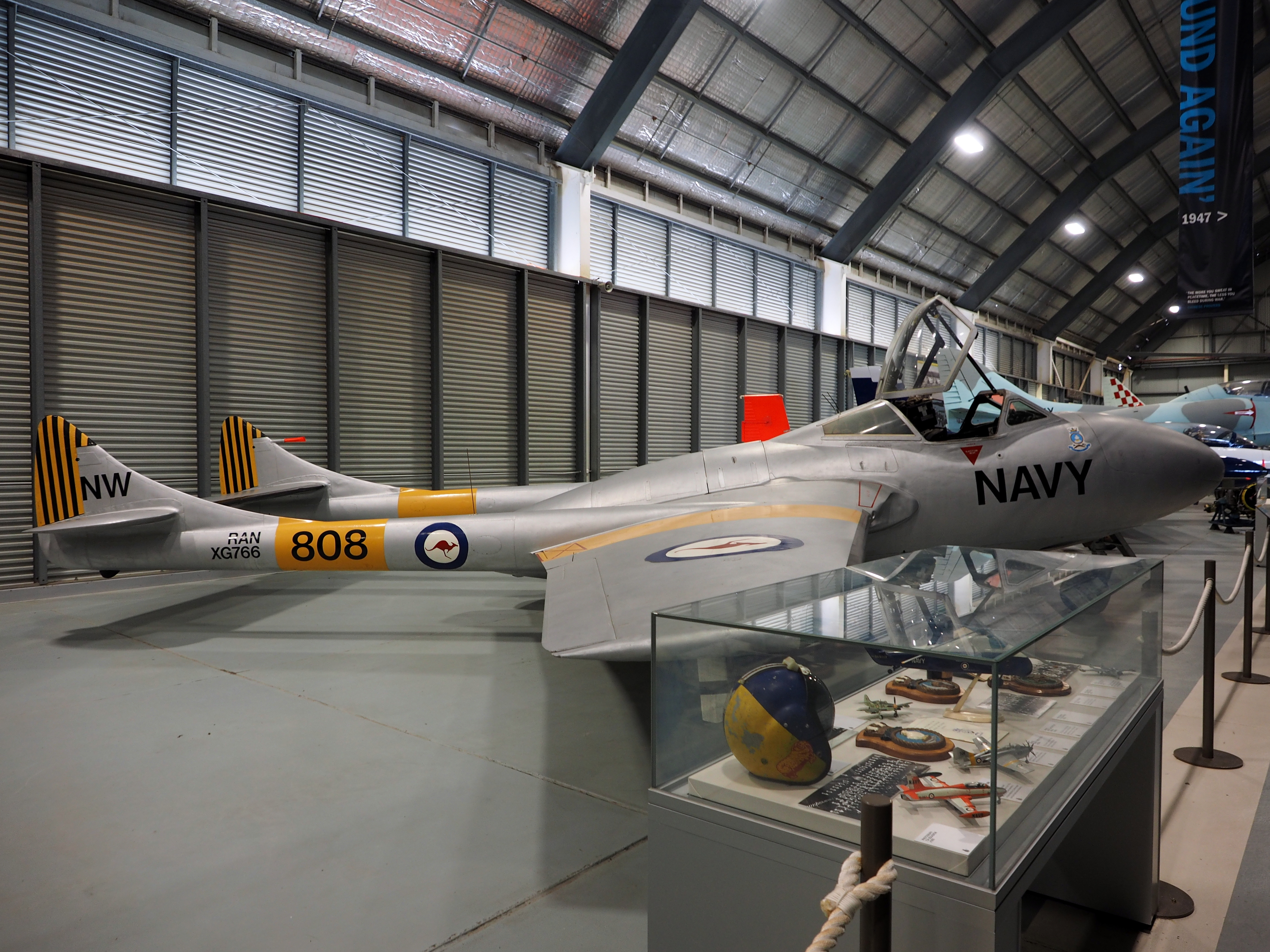
A former Royal Australian Navy Sea Vampire on display at the service's Fleet Air Arm Museum

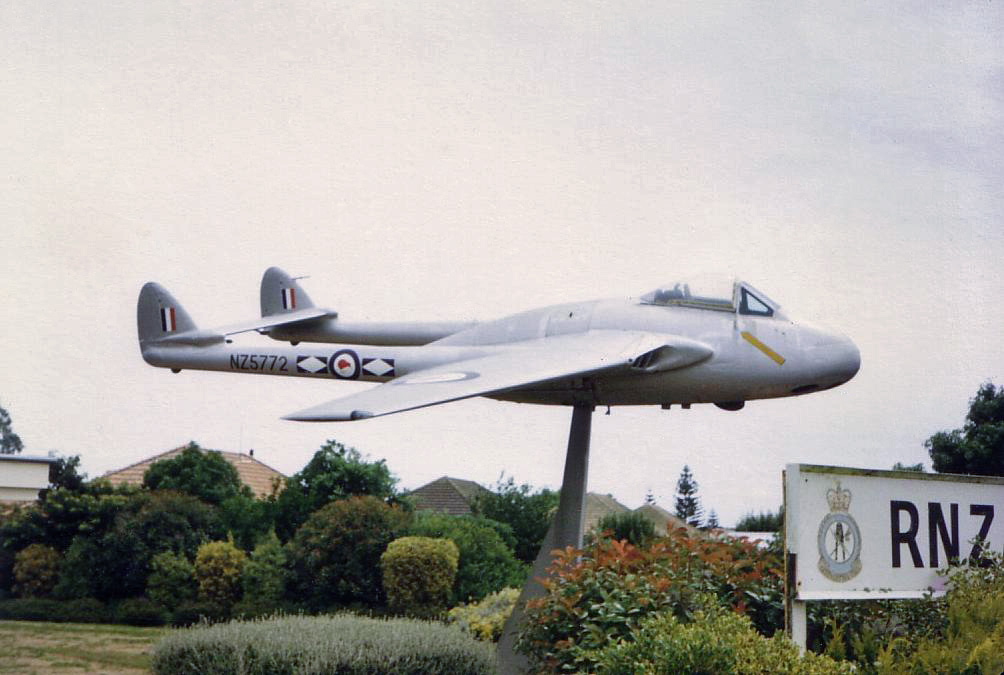
No. 14 Squadron RNZAF Vampire FB.9 on gate duty at Ohakea, New Zealand

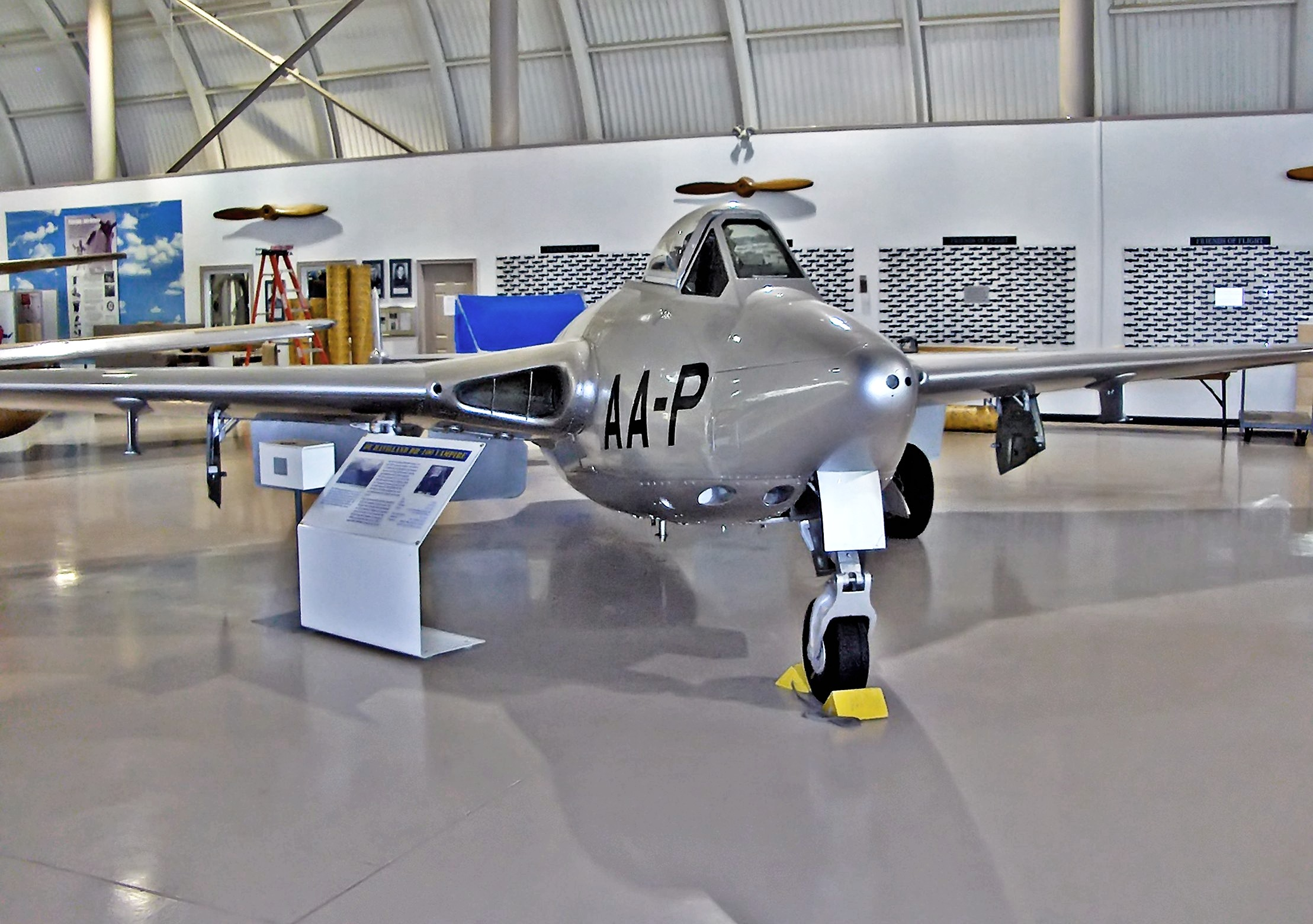
Vampire built under licence for the Swiss Air Force in 1969 as an FB.6 painted as an F.3 in RCAF service (Canadian Warplane Heritage Museum).

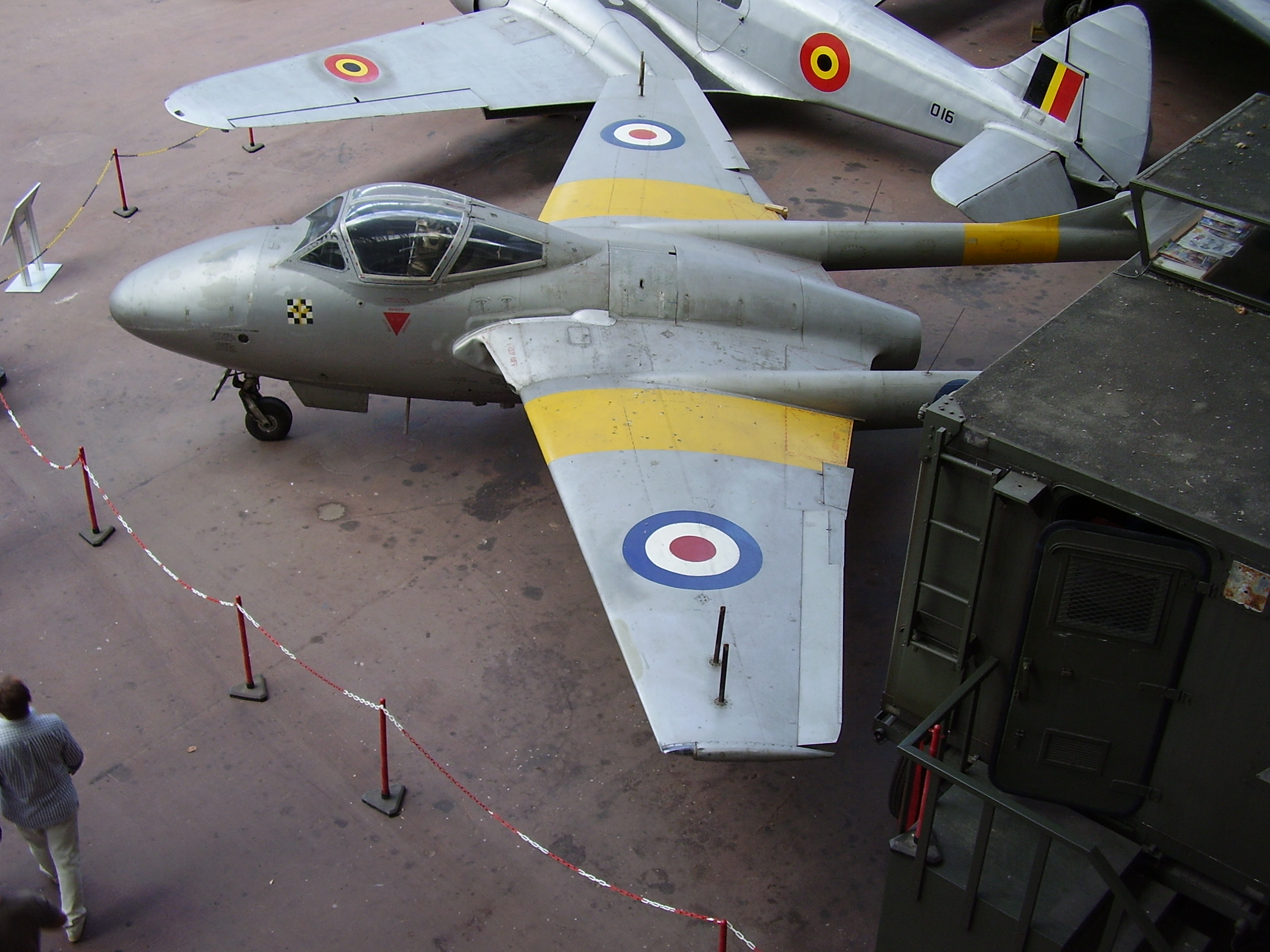
de Havilland DH-115 Vampire T.11 in Royal Museum of the Armed Forces and Military History, Brussels, Belgium

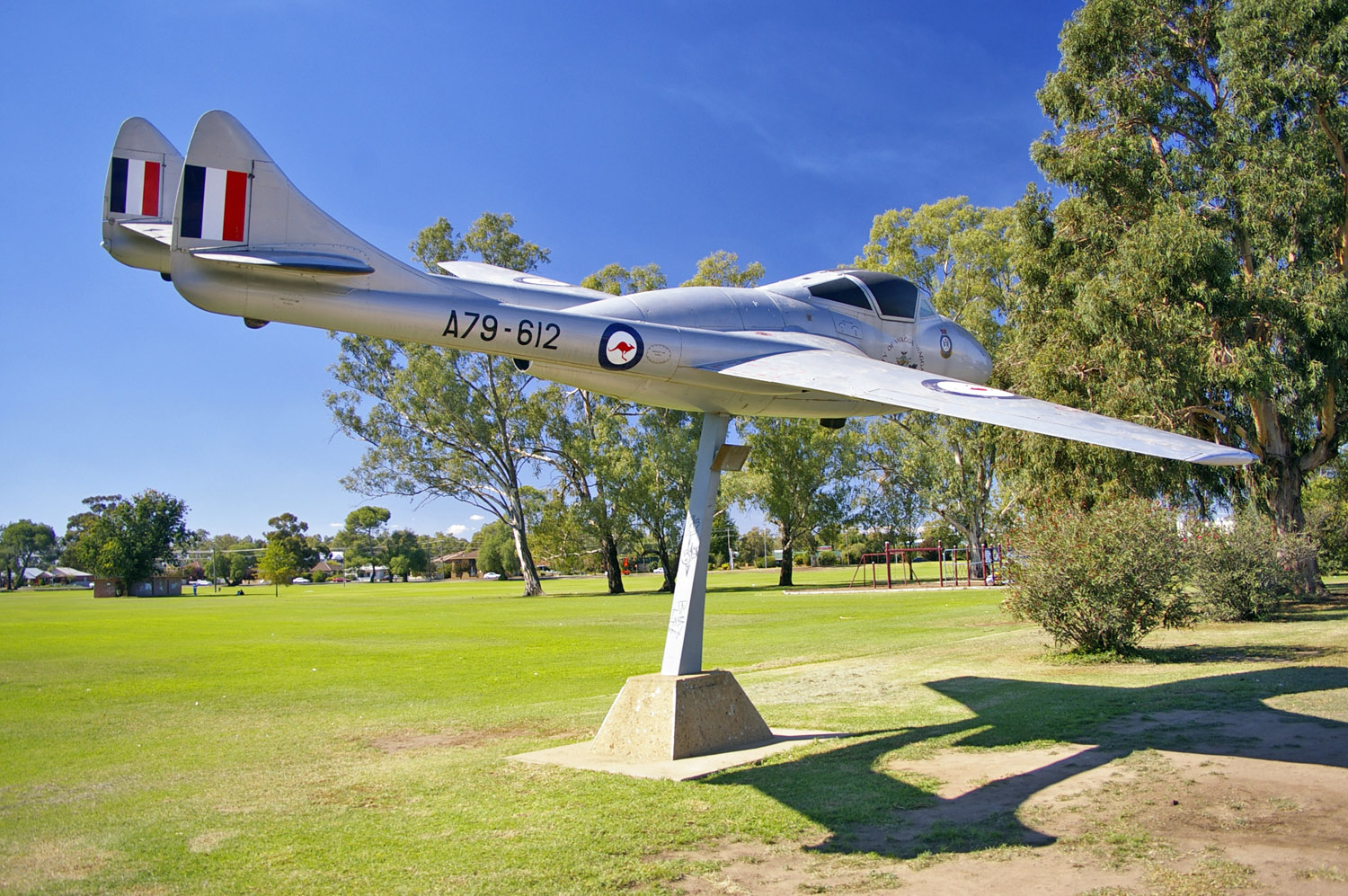
de Havilland Vampire T.35 (A79-612) in Wagga Wagga, Australia

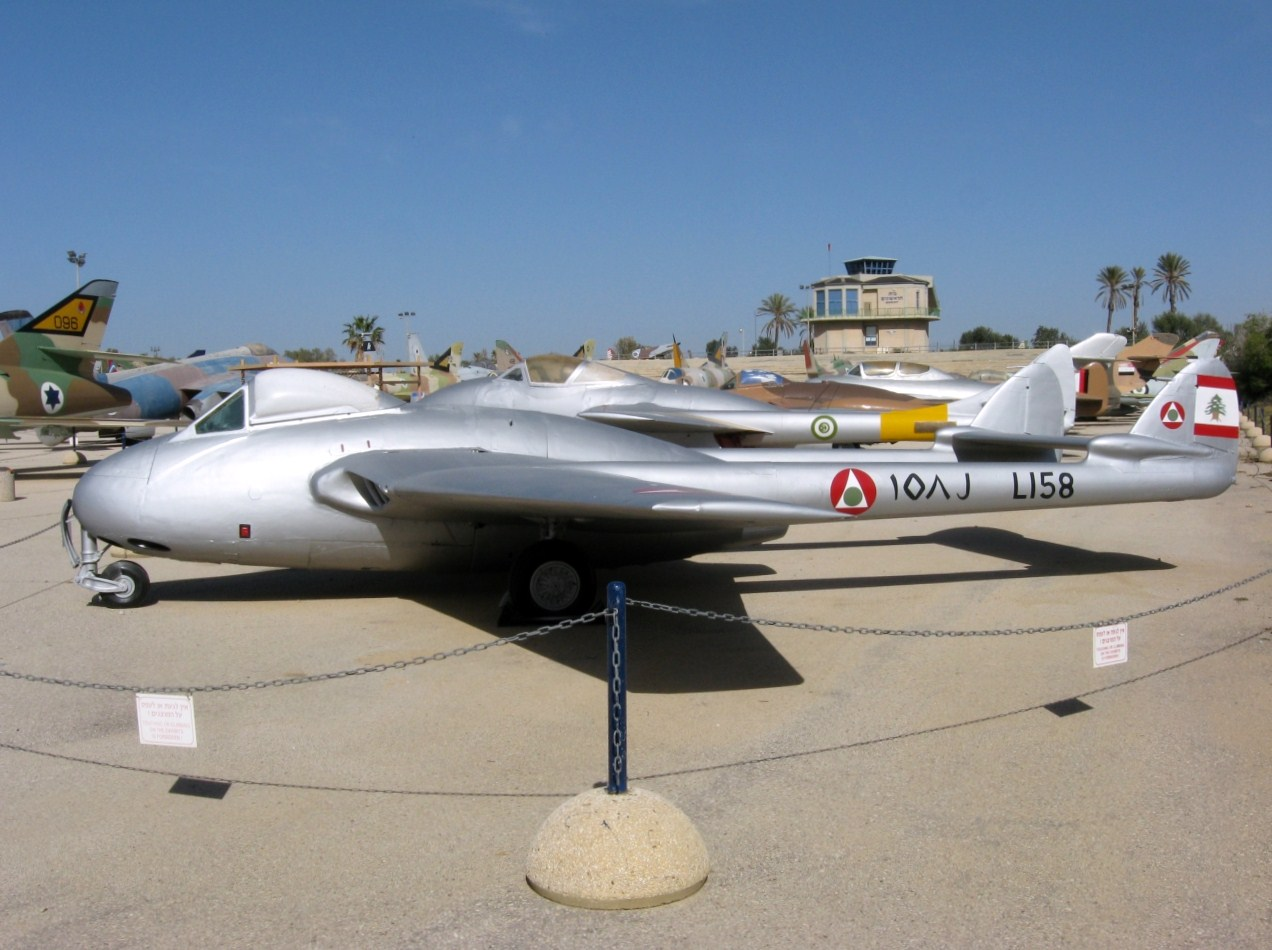
Vampire bearing Lebanese colours at Hatzerim, Israel

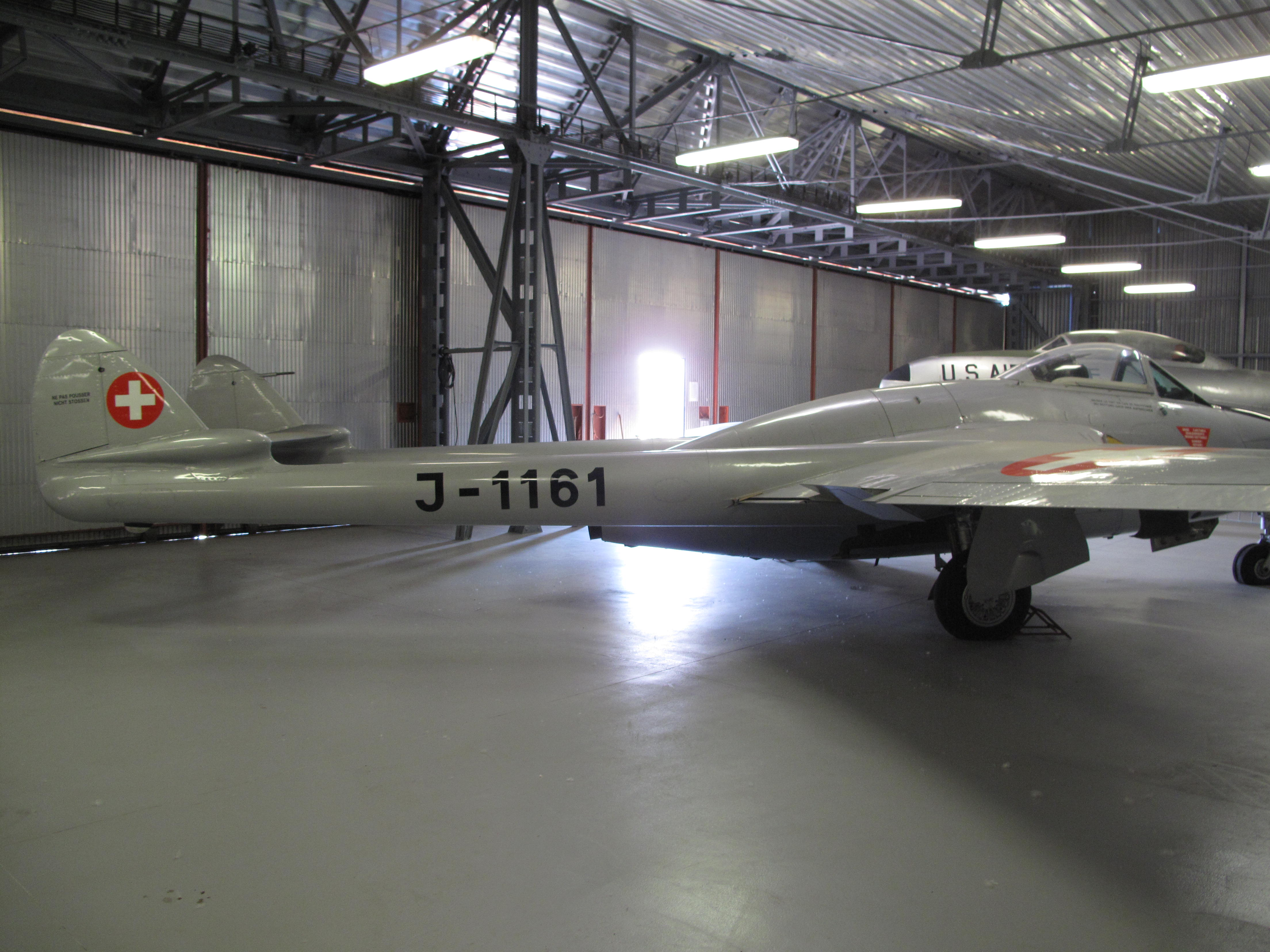
Swiss Air Force Vampire at Letecké muzeum Kbely

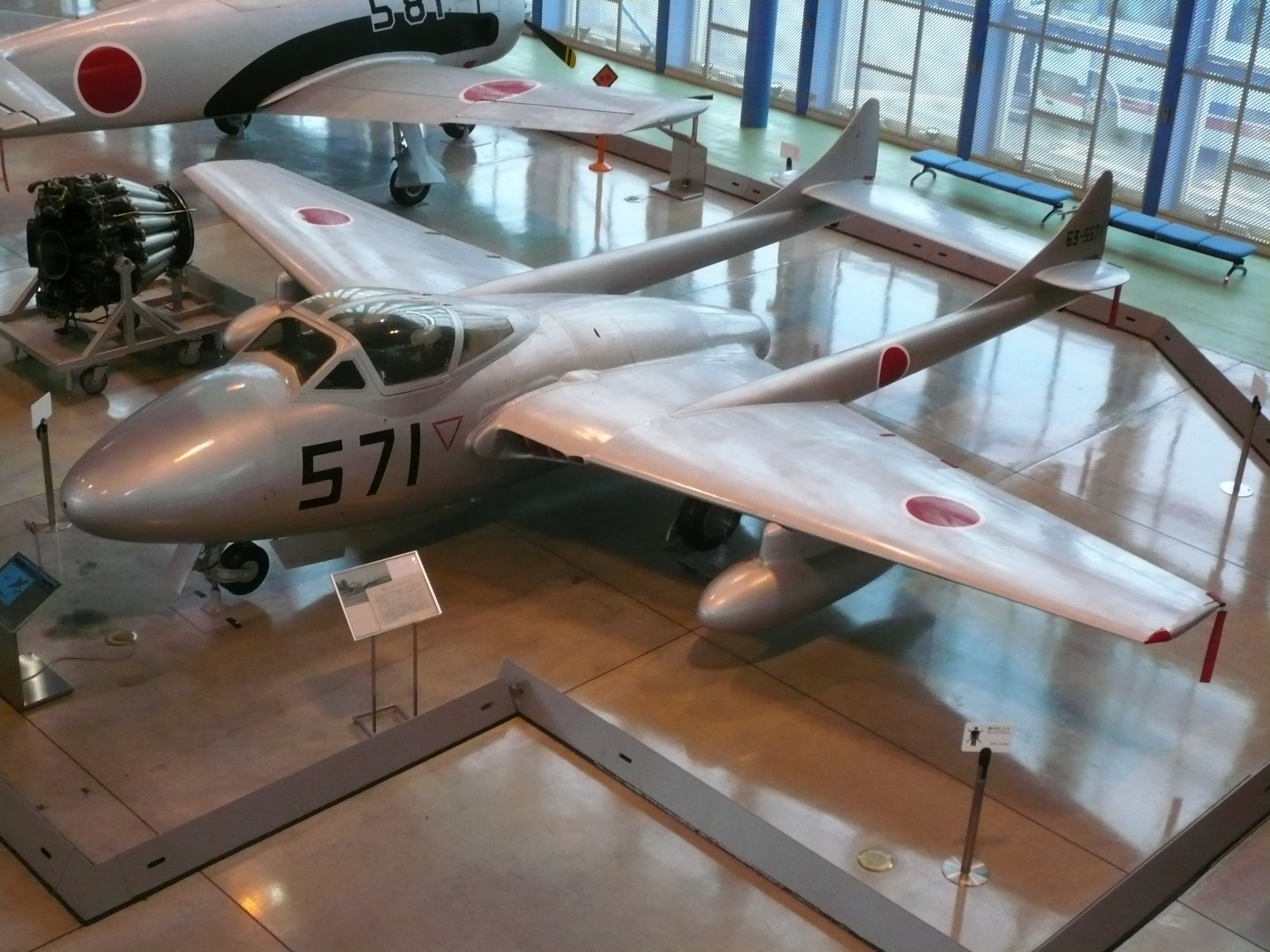
T.55 of Japan Air Self-Defense Force at Hamamatsu Air Base public hall

=== Australia ===
- A79-1 – F.30 on static display at Fighter World at RAAF Base Williamtown. It is the first jet aircraft to be built in Australia.
- A79-109 – F.30 on static display in Forbes.
- A79-202 – F.30 on static display at the South Australian Aviation Museum, in Port Adelaide.
- A79-321 - F.30 on Static display at Central West shopping centre in Braybrook, in the inner western suburbs of Melbourne, on the grounds of the former base RAAF Tottenham Store. Former SAAF and then Rhodesian/Zimbabwean Air Force plane, imported to Australia in 1988.
- A79-375 – F.30 on static display at the RAAF Museum at RAAF Williams in Point Cook. It is painted as A79-876, a target tug.
- A79-390 – FB.31 on under restoration to static display at Tamworth Airport in Tamworth.
- A79-476 – F.30 on static display at the Queensland Air Museum in Caloundra.
- A79-593 – FB.31 on static display in Wingham.
- A79-602 – T.35 on static display at Lincoln Nitschke's Aviation Museum in Greenock.
- A79-612 – T.35 on static display at a park in Wagga Wagga.
- A79-656 – T.35 on static display at the RAAF Townsville Aviation Heritage Centre in Townsville.
- A79-660/663 – T.35 on static display at Bill's Machinery in Wanneroo,.
- A79-804 – T.35 on static display at the RAAF Townsville Aviation Heritage Centre in Townsville.
- A79-821 – T.35A on static display at RAAF Western Australia museum, Bull Creek.
- R8128 – FB.52 on static display at the Central West Shopping Plaza in Braybrook. It was previously flown by Rhodesia and was imported in 1988.
- XG770 – T.22 on static display at the Fleet Air Arm Museum in Nowra.

=== Austria ===
- 5C-VF – T.11 on static display at the Military Aviation Museum Zeltweg of the Museum of Military History at Zeltweg Air Base in Zeltweg, Styria.
- 5C-YA – T.55 under restoration at the Austrian Aviation Museum in Graz, Styria.

=== Belgium ===
- VV217 — FB.5 on static display.
- XH292 – T.11 on static display at the Royal Museum of the Armed Forces and Military History in Brussels.
- U-1237 — T.11 (XJ773) in storage.

=== Canada ===
- 17031 – F.3 on static display at the Comox Air Force Museum at CFB Comox in Comox, British Columbia.
- 17058 – F.3 on static display at the Canadian Museum of Flight in Langley, British Columbia.
- 17069 – F.3 on static display at The Hangar Flight Museum in Calgary, Alberta.
- 17072 - F.3 in storage since December 2020 with the New Brunswick Aviation Museum .
- 17074 – F.3 on static display at the Canada Aviation and Space Museum in Ottawa, Ontario.
- J-1145 – FB.6 on static display at the Canadian Warplane Heritage Museum in Hamilton, Ontario.
- TG372 – Mk.I on static display at the Canada Aviation and Space Museum in Ottawa, Ontario.
- VP189 – T.35 on static display at the Alberta Aviation Museum in Edmonton, Alberta.
- A79-657 - T.35 on static display at the Jet Aircraft Museum in London, Ontario, currently having restorations onto the aircraft.

=== Chile ===
- J-03 – T.11 on display at the Museo Nacional Aeronáutico y del Espacio.
- J-306 – T.11 on display at the Museo Nacional Aeronáutico y del Espacio
- J-304 – T.11 exhibited inside Cerro Moreno, Antofagasta AFB.
- J-302 – T.11 as gate guardian of Diego Aracena AFB of Iquique.
- An example placed in a restaurant of Antofagasta city in northern Chile.
- A Vampire was previously placed on a pole in the intersection of Gran Avenida and Américo Vespucio in Santiago, Chile but was destroyed due to a bombing attack in the 1980s, remains are in the open at Los Cerrillos Museo Aeronáutico.

=== Czech Republic ===
- J-1161 – FB.6 on static display at the Prague Aviation Museum in Kbely, Prague.

=== Finland ===
- Fv28326 – FB.50 on static display in Kurikka, South Ostrobothnia.
- VA-2 – FB.52 on static display at the Finnish Aviation Museum in Vantaa, Uusimaa.
- VA-6 – FB.52 on static display at the Aviation Museum of Central Finland in Tikkakoski, Jyväskylä.
- VT-6 — T.55 on static display in Lahti-Vesivehmaa.
- VT-8 — T.55 on static display in Tikkakoski.
- VT-9 – T.55 on static display at the Finnish Aviation Museum in Vantaa, Uusimaa.
- FB.52 at the Finnish Airforce Museum in Jyväskylä, Central Finland.
- FB.52 at the Finnish Airforce Museum in Jyväskylä, Central Finland.
- T.55 in storage at the Finnish Airforce Museum in Jyväskylä, Central Finland.
- T.55 in storage at the Finnish Airforce Museum in Jyväskylä, Central Finland.

=== France ===
- XE950 — T.11 on static display at the Ailes Anciennes in Toulouse.
- U-1223 — T.55 in storage in Rennes-Saint Jacques.
- U-1227 — T.55 on static display at the Musee Aeronautique dOrange.
- J-1101 — FB.6 in storage in Rennes-Saint Jacques.
- 185 — T.55 on static display at the Musee des Avions de Chasse.

=== Germany ===
- J-1081 – FB.6 on static display at the Technikmuseum Speyer in Speyer, Rhineland-Palatinate.

=== India ===
- IB-799 – FB.52 on static display at the Indian Air Force Museum, Palam in Palam, New Delhi.
- IN149 – T.55 on static display at the Naval Aviation Museum in Vasco da Gama, Goa.
- HB546 – F.3 on static display at the Air Force Technical College, Bangalore in Bangalore, Karnataka.
- IB1638 – FB.52 on static display in Dundigal, Telangana.
- FTW1971 – FB.52 on static display at Hakimpet Air Force Station in Hakimpet, Telangana.
- ID606 - NF.54 Vampire on static display at the Indian Air Force Museum, Palam in Palam, New Delhi

=== Indonesia ===
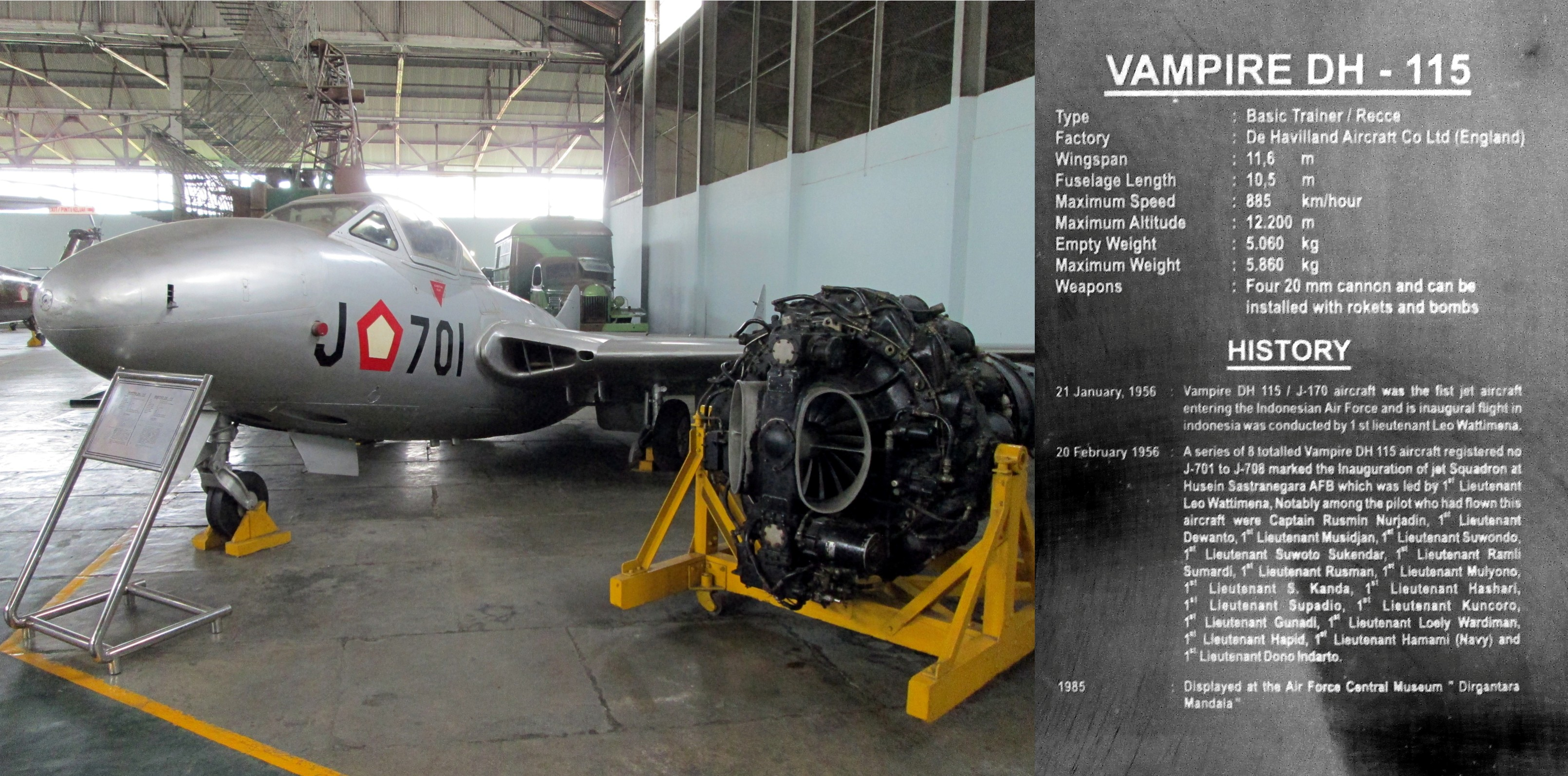
Vampire T.11 J-701 on display in Yogyakarta

- J-701 (NZ5708) — T.11 on display at Dirgantara Mandala Museum, Adisutjipto Air Force Base, Yogyakarta.

=== Ireland ===
- 187 — T.55 in storage in Dromod.
- 191 — T.55 on display at the Shannon Aviation Museum in Shannon, County Clare.
- 192 — T.55 in storage in Dromod.
- 198 (XE977) — T.55 in Collins Barracks (Dublin) as part of the Defence Forces exhibition National Museum of Ireland.
- WZ549 — T.11 on display at the Ulster Aviation Society.

=== Israel ===
- 0053 – T.55 on display at Israeli Air Force Museum.
- 255 – FB.52 on display at Israeli Air Force Museum.

=== Italy ===
- J-1159 – FB.6 on static display at Volandia in Somma Lombardo, Varese.
- MM6152 – NF.54 on static display at the Italian Air Force Museum in Bracciano, Lazio.

=== Japan ===
- 63-5571 – T.55 on static display at JASDF Hamamatsu Air Base Publication Center at Hamamatsu Air Base in Hamamatsu, Shizuoka. It was formerly G-5-14.

=== Jordan ===
- U-1216 — T.55 in storage with the Royal Jordanian Heritage Flight.
- J-1106 — FB.6 in storage with the Royal Jordanian Heritage Flight.

=== Lebanon ===
- L-154 — T.55 on static display at the Lebanese Air Force Museum at Rayak Air Base in Rayak.

=== Malta ===
- WZ550 – T.11 on static display at the Malta Aviation Museum in Ta' Qali.

=== Mexico ===
- 15 — T.11 on display at the Mexican Military Aviation Museum in Mexico.
- 5 — F.3 on static display at the Mexican Army and Air Force Museum in Guadalajara, Jalisco.

=== New Zealand ===
- NZ5704 — T.11 on static display in Wigram.
- NZ5707 – T.11 on static display at the Ashburton Aviation Museum in Ashburton, Canterbury.
- NZ5710 – T.11 in storage at the Air Force Museum of New Zealand in Wigram, Canterbury.
- VZ843 — FB.5 in storage in Tauranga.
- XA167 — T.22 in storage in Wanaka.
- NZ5751 – FB.5 under restoration at Classic Flyers in Tauranga, Bay of Plenty.
- NZ5757 – FB.5 on static display at the Air Force Museum of New Zealand in Wigram, Canterbury.
- NZ5765 – FB.5 on static display at the New Zealand Fighter Pilots Museum in Wanaka, Otago. It is on loan from the Air Force Museum of New Zealand.
- NZ5769 – FB.5 on static display at the Ashburton Aviation Museum in Ashburton, Canterbury.
- NZ5770 – FB.5 on static display at the Southward Car Museum in Paraparaumu, Wellington.
- NZ5772 – FB.5 on static display as a gate guardian at RNZAF Ohakea in Bulls.
- WR202 – FB.9 on static display at the Museum of Transport and Technology in Western Springs, Auckland.

=== Norway ===
- EEP42408 – F.3 on static display at the Forsvarets Flysamling in Gardermoen, Ullensaker.
- EEP42459 – F.3 cockpit section on static display at the Norwegian Museum of Science and Technology in Oslo.
- V0184 – FB.52 on static display at the Norwegian Aviation Museum in Bodø, Nordland.
- U-1217 – T.55 on static display at the Flyhistorisk Museum, Sola in Sola Municipality, Rogaland. It was license built in Switzerland.
- FV28456 – T.55 on static display at the Torp Fighter Collection, a group within Dakota Norway, at Sandefjord Airport, Torp.

=== Poland ===
- J-1142 – FB.6 on static display at the Polish Aviation Museum in Kraków, Lesser Poland. It was license built in Switzerland.

=== Saudi Arabia ===
- 541 – FB.52 on static display at the Royal Saudi Air Force Museum.

=== South Africa ===
- 205 – FB.52 on static display at the South African Air Force Museum, AFB Port Elizabeth, Static display.
- 208 – FB.52 on static display at the South African Air Force Museum, AFB Ysterplaat, Cape Town, Static display.
- 229 – FB.52 on static display at the South African Air Force Museum, AFB Swartkop, Pretoria, Static Display.

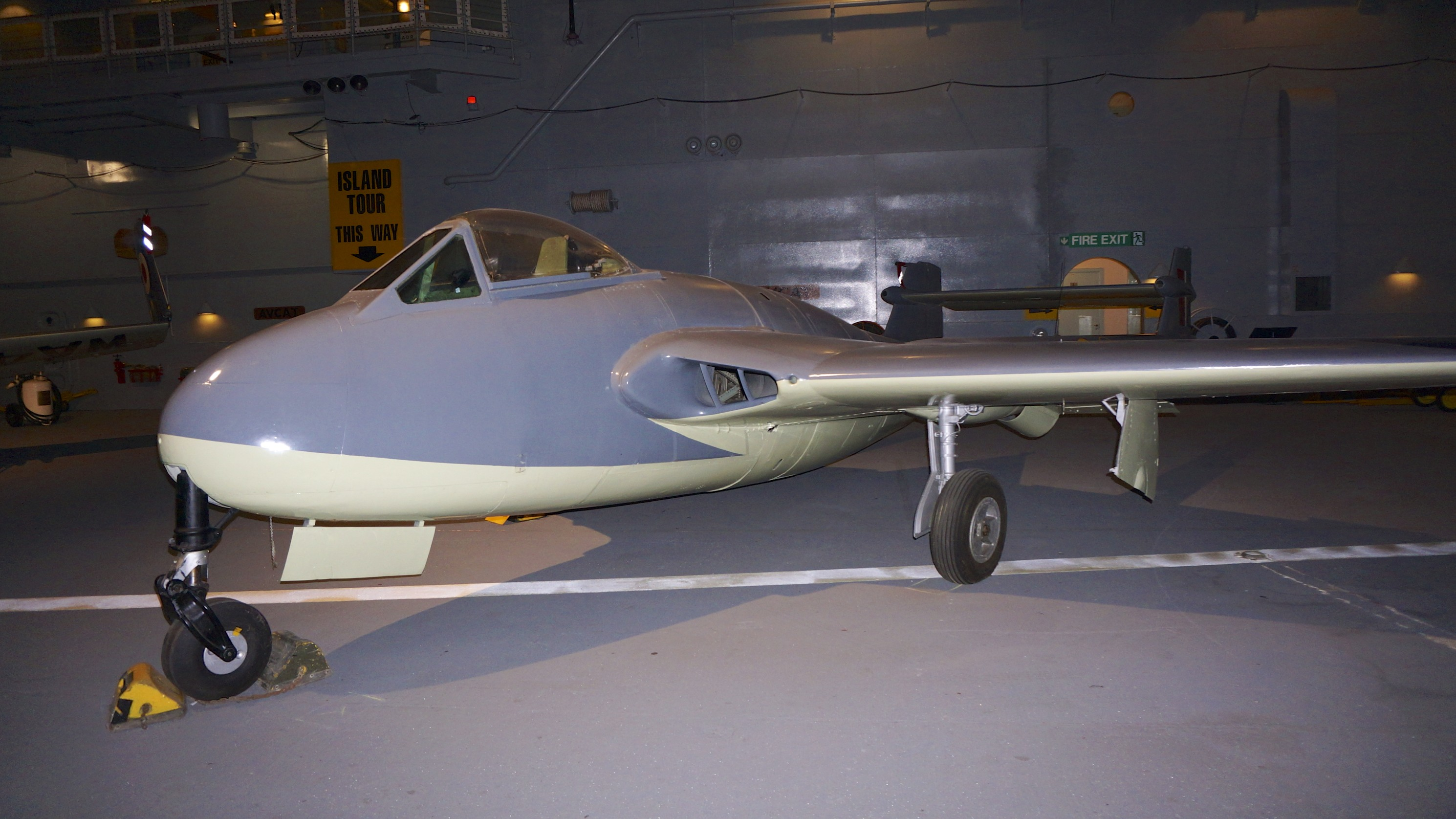
A Sea Vampire on display at the British Fleet Air Arm Museum

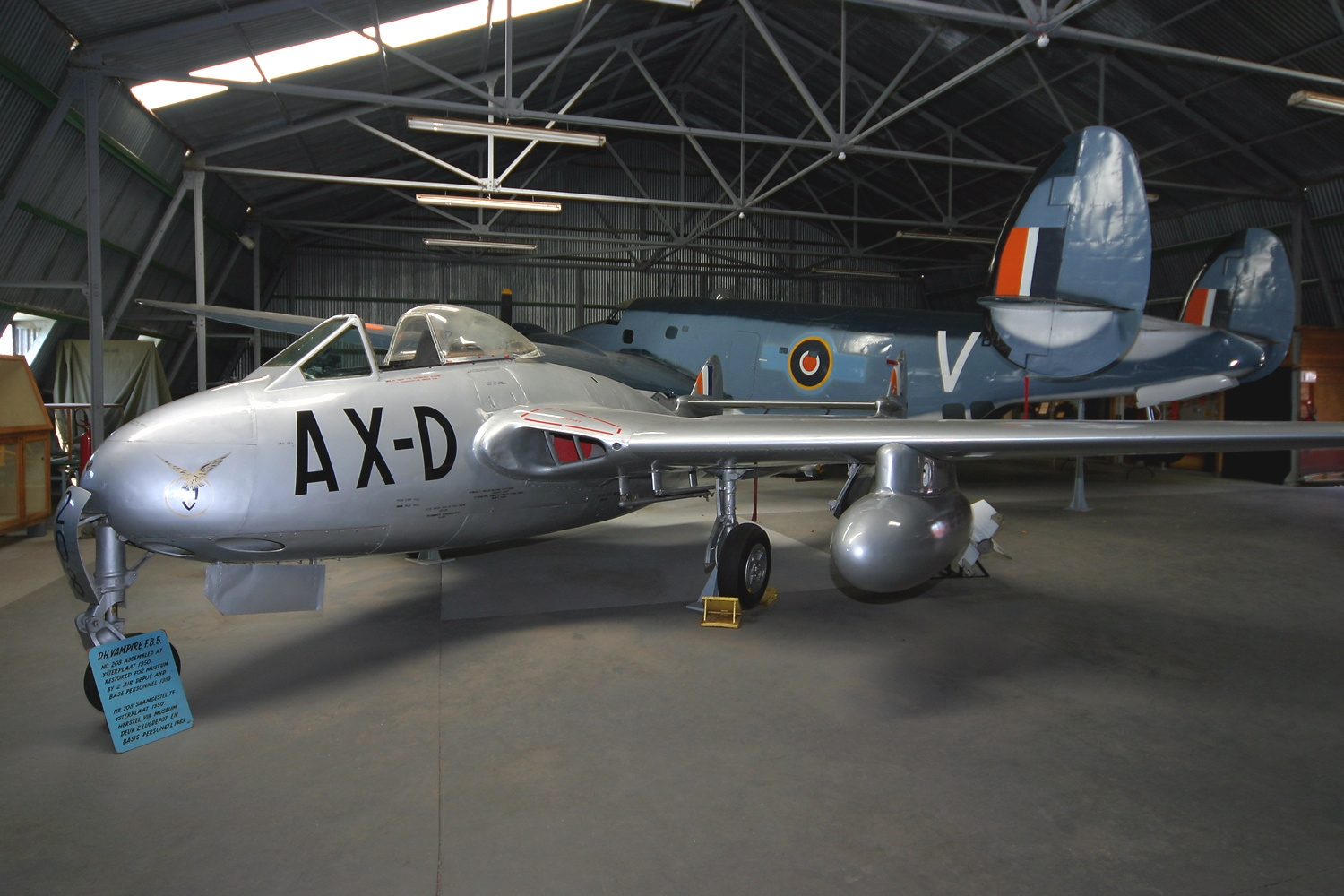
Vampire at Ysterplaat

=== Sweden ===
- Fv28001 – J.28A on static display at the Swedish Air Force Museum in Linköping, Östergötland.
- Fv28219 – J.28B on static display at the Söderhamn / F15 Flygmuseum in Söderhamn, Gävleborg.
- Fv28307 – J.28B on static display at the Svedino Automobile and Aviation Museum in Ugglarp, Halland.
- Fv28311 – J 28B on static display at the Jämtlands Flyg- och Lottamuseum in Optand, Jämtland.
- Fv28391 – J.28B on static display at Flygmuseet F 21 in Luleå, Norrbotten.
- Fv28444 – J.28C on static display at the Svedino Automobile and Aviation Museum in Ugglarp, Halland.
- Fv28451 – J.28C on static display at the Swedish Air Force Museum in Linköping, Östergötland.
- U-1221 — T.55 on display in Angleholm.

=== Switzerland ===
- J-1153 – FB.6 on static display at the Flieger-Flab-Museum in Dübendorf, Zürich.
- J-1157 – FB.6 on static display at the Clin d'Ailes museum in Payerne, Vaud.
- U-1203 – T.55 on static display at Fliegermuseum Dubendorf.
- U-1211 – T.55 on static display at the Clin d'Ailes museum in Payerne, Vaud.
- U-1212 – T.55 (ex SE-DXT) on display at the Fliegermuseum Altenrhein.
- U-1218 — T.55 on display in Lodrino, Switzerland.
- U-1224 – T.55 in the reserve collection at the Flieger-Flab-Museum in Dübendorf, Zürich.
- U-1235 — T.11 (XD594) in storage at Sion airfield.
- U-1239 – T.11 (XD544) in storage with the de Havilland Vampire Heritage Group in Bex, Switzerland.

=== Turkey ===
- TBD – FB.6 on static display at the Rahmi M. Koç Museum in Istanbul.

=== United Kingdom ===
- VF301 — F.1 on display at the Midland Air Museum, Coventry, England.
- VT812 — F.3 on display at the Royal Air Force Museum London in London.
- WA346 — FB.5 under restoration at the Royal Air Force Museum Cosford, England.
- XD382 — T.11 on static display at East Midlands Aeropark.
- XD434 — T.11 on static display at the de Havilland Aircraft Museum.
- XD447 — T.11 on static display at East Midlands Aeropark.
- XD593 — T.11 on display at the Newark Air Museum, England.
- XD515 — T.11 on static display at the Cosford Museum Store.
- XD596 — T.11 on static display at the Southampton Hall of Aviation.
- XD626 — T.11 on display at the Midland Air Museum, Coventry, England.
- XE852 — T.11 on display at Headquarters No. 2247 (Hawarden) Squadron Air Training Corps, Hawarden, Flintshire, Wales.
- XE855 — T.11 on display at the Midland Air Museum, Coventry, England.
- XE856 — T.11 on display at the Bournemouth Aviation Museum, England.
- XE935 — T.11 on display at the South Yorkshire Aircraft Museum, Doncaster, England.
- XE956 — T.11 on display at the South Wales Aviation Museum.
- XE998 — T.11 on display at the Solent Sky Museum, Southampton, England.
- XH278 — T.11 on display at Yorkshire Air Museum, Elvington, Yorkshire.
- XH313 — T.11 on display at the Tangmere Military Aviation Museum, England
- XJ772 — T.11 on display at the de Havilland Aircraft Heritage Centre, Hertfordshire, England
- XK590 — T.11 on display at the Wellesbourne Wartime Museum, Warwickshire, England.
- XK632 — T.11 on display in the reception area of Vanguard Self-Storage, Maidenhead, England.
- XK624 — T.11 on display at the Norfolk and Suffolk Aviation Museum, Flixton, England.
- WZ450 — T.11 on display at Vanguard Self Storage, Bath, England
- WZ515 — T.11 on display at the Solway Aviation Museum, Carlisle, England.
- WZ518 — T.11 on display at the North East Land, Sea and Air Museums, Sunderland, England.

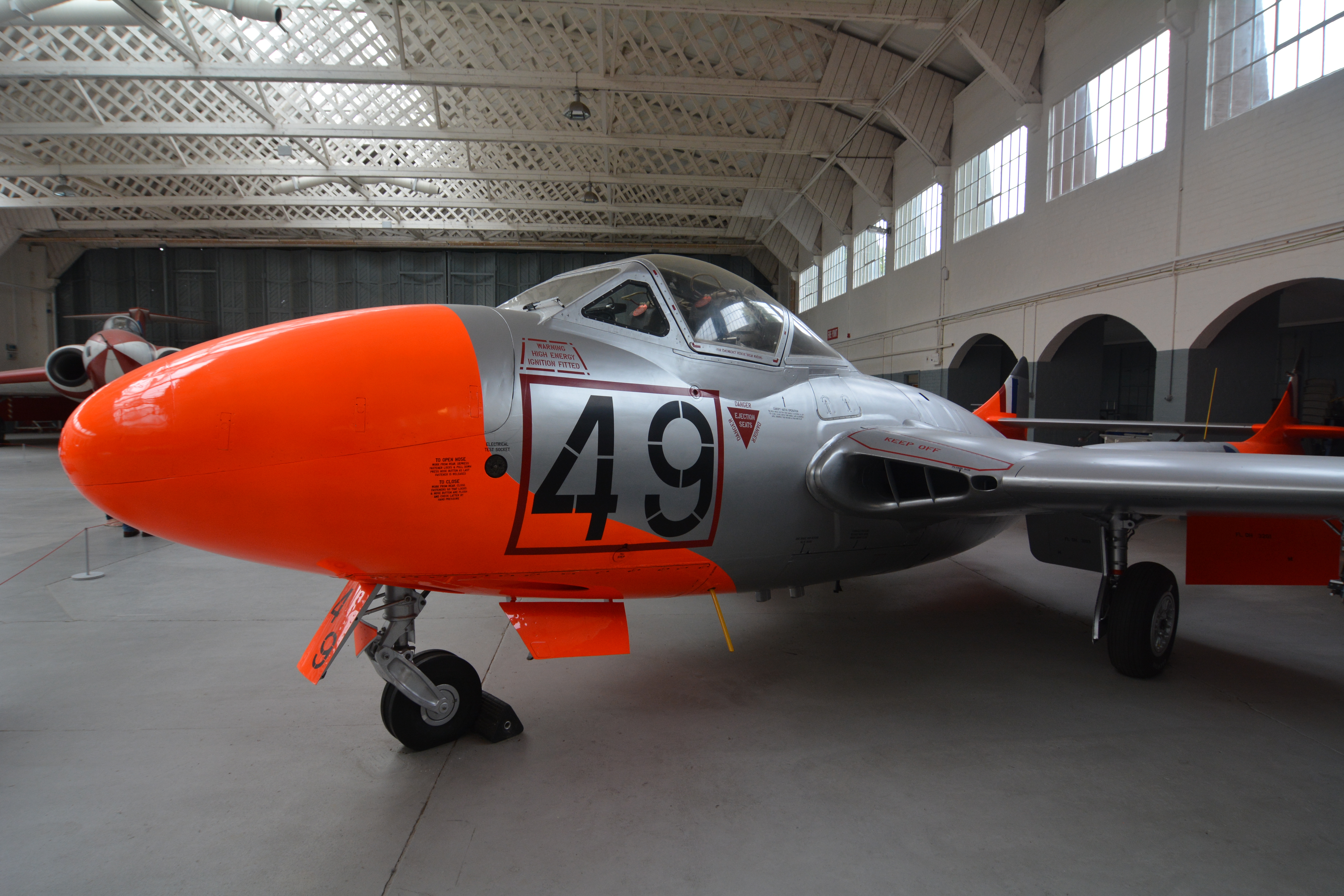
WZ590 on display at the Imperial War Museum Duxford in 201

- WZ590 — T.11 on display at the Imperial War Museum Duxford, England.
- XK623 — T.11 on display at Caernarfon Airworld Museum, Gwynedd, Wales.
- XA109 — T.22 on display at Montrose Air Station Heritage Centre, Angus, Scotland.
- XA129 — T.22 on display in Yeovilton.
- XG743 — T.22 on display at Fishburn Airfield
- XG775 - T.22. The Admirals Barge, under restoration Fishburn Airfield.
- 333 — T.55 in storage in Doncaster at the South Yorkshire Aircraft Museum.

=== United States ===
- A79-639 — T.35 in storage at Paine Field.
- A79-646 – T.35 with the Warbirds of the World Air Museum in Los Lunas, New Mexico.
- A79-654 — T.35 in storage at Paine Field.
- A79-661 – T.35 on static display at the Pima Air & Space Museum in Tucson, Arizona.
- IB1686 – FB.52 in storage with Ultimate aviation in Brigham City, Utah.
- 17018 – F.3 on static display at the Planes of Fame Air Museum in Valle, Arizona.
- J-1102 — FB.6 in storage in Florida.
- J-1128 — FB.6 in storage in Willcox, Arizona.
- J-1129 – FB.6 on static display at the Planes of Fame Air Museum in Chino, California.
- U-1205 – T.55 with an unknown owner.
- IB882 – FB.52 with Reid Moorhead in Beaverton, Oregon.

=== Venezuela ===
- 3C35 – FB.52 at the Aeronautics Museum of Maracay, Venezuela.
- IE35 – T.11 at the Aeronautics Museum of Maracay, Venezuela.

== Surviving aircraft ==
=== Australia ===
- A79-617 – T.35 airworthy with the Air Force Heritage Squadron at Temora, New South Wales. It was exported to the United States after being sold by the Royal Australian Air Force in January 1970. It was then returned to Australia and based at the Temora Aviation Museum. Ownership was transferred to the RAAF in July 2019 and it is operated by the Air Force Heritage Squadron (Temora Historic Flight).
- A79-636 – T.35 in storage at the RAAF Museum waiting for a restoration to flight. Restored to flying in 1988 but grounded in 1997 due to airframe fatigue. Capable of being started and taxied.
- A79-637 – T.35 under restoration to airworthy at the Historical Aircraft Restoration Society in Albion Park Rail, New South Wales.
- R1835 – FB.52 being restored to airworthy condition by Old Aeroplane Company in Tyabb, Victoria. Originally operated by the SAAF from 1953 until 1974 when it was loaned to Rhodesia and designated with RhodAF serial R1835. Its last flight was in approximately 1982 for the AFZ before coming to Australia in 1988.
- VH-T55 - T.55 Refurbished and airworthy flying with Paul Bennet Airshows out of Rutherford NSW Australia.

=== Brazil ===
- A79-645 — T.35 airworthy with Bruno Luciano Henriques at Tatui Airfield.

=== Canada ===
- U-1213 – T.55 airworthy with Waterloo Warbirds in Breslau, Ontario. It was previously operated by Switzerland.

=== France ===
- J-1127 — FB.6 airworthy in Paris.
- J-1191 — FB.6 airworthy in Paris.

=== Jordan ===
- U-1215 – T.55 airworthy with the Royal Jordanian Heritage Flight in Aqaba. It was previously owned by the Classic Air Force and was initially flown by the Swiss Air Force.

=== New Zealand ===
- U-1225 – T.55 airworthy with Fine Particle Application in Inglewood, Taranaki.
- A79-649 – T.35 airworthy with the E. J. Currie Family Trust in Christchurch, New Zealand.

Additional: Vampire cockpit and nose section on display in main hall of Air Force Museum, Christchurch. Static display Vampire on plinth at RNZAF Ohakea, fuselage rebuilt with fibreglass by Ben Tilson, Simon Turner and Ollie Ball.

=== Norway ===
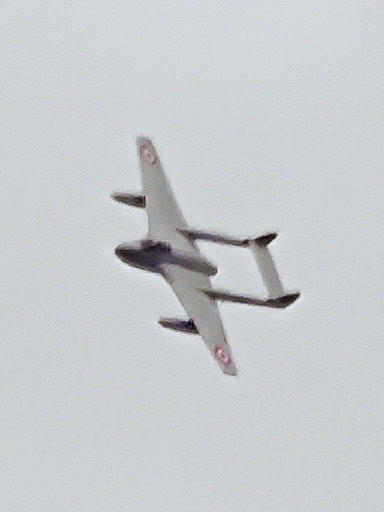
de Havilland Vampire LN-DHY at the 2023 Imperial War Museum Duxford Battle of Britain airshow

- J-1196 – FB.52 airworthy as LN-DHY, with the Norwegian Airforce Historical Squadron in Rygge, Østfold. License built in Switzerland.
- U-1230 – T.55 airworthy as LN-DHZ, with the Norwegian Airforce Historical Squadron in Rygge, Østfold. License built in Switzerland.
- J-28 owned by a private collector. Stored. Ex Swedish Air Force.

=== South Africa ===
- 276 – T.55 airworthy with the South African Air Force Museum in Pretoria, Gauteng.
- 277 – T.55 airworthy with the South African Air Force Museum in Pretoria, Gauteng.
- U-1214 – T.55 airworthy with Hendrik Venter Pretoria, Gauteng.
- U-1219 – T.55 airworthy with Exup Trust in Pretoria, Gauteng.

=== Sweden ===
- U-1212 – T.55 airworthy with the Swedish Air Force Historic Flight.
- U-1236 – T.55 (WZ570) airworthy with the Flygexpo Vasteras AB.

=== Switzerland ===
- J-1082 — FB.6 airworthy with the Fliegermuseum (Swiss Flying Museum).
- J-1103 – FB.6 airworthy with A-Jet AG in Evilard, Bern.
- J-1197 – FB.6 airworthy with Eric Chardonnens in Lutry, Vaud.
- U-1208 – T.55 airworthy with A-Jet AG in Evilard, Bern.
- U-1228 – T.55 airworthy with the Fliegermuseum in Thal, St. Gallen.
- U-1238 – T.11 (XD440) airworthy, as SE-DXU, Ex Swedish Air Force Historic Flight. Now with Fliegermuseum in Thal, St. Gallen.

=== United Kingdom ===
- WZ507 – T.11 airworthy with the Vampire Preservation Group in Coventry, Warwickshire.

=== United States ===
- BY385 – T.55 airworthy with Ultimate Aviation of Ogden, Utah.
- U-1206 – T.55 airworthy with Taton James M in Denver, Colorado.
- U-1222 – T.55 airworthy with American Vampire in Crestview, Florida.
- U-1226 – T.55 airworthy with Vampire Aviation in Wilmington, Delaware.
- U-1229 – T.55 airworthy with Vampire Aviation in Wilmington, Delaware.
- XE920 – T.11 airworthy with the Vampire Jet Museum in Sioux Falls, South Dakota.
