= Helicopter Training School =

Helicopter Training School
- IATA: none; ICAO: VOHK

Summary
- Airport type: Military (Indian Air Force)
- Operator: Training Command, Indian Air Force
- Serves: Hyderabad, India
- Location: Hakimpet, Telangana
- Elevation AMSL: 2,020 ft (620 m)
- Coordinates: 17.3312°N 78.3129°E
- Interactive map of Helicopter Training School

Runways
| Direction | Length | | Surface |
| Direction | ft | m | Surface |
|---|---|---|---|
| 09/27 | 7,384 | 2,250 | Concrete / asphalt |

Helicopter Training School (HTS) is an institution of Indian Air Force located at Hyderabad. It was established at Air Force Station Hakimpet on 2 April 1962. It is one of the largest helicopter units of IAF.

== Training ==
Apart from training helicopter pilots for the Air Force, the Helicopter Training School also trains pilots of the Army, Navy, Coast Guard and other friendly countries.

The Helicopter Training School located in Air Force Station Hakimpet has about 40 types of helicopters, and on an average, 15 to 20 helicopters fly everyday as part of training to officers.

== Participation in relief work ==
HTS participated in relief works during floods in Andhra Pradesh and Karnataka and air-dropped food and other essential supplies.

== See also ==
- Indian National Defence University
- Military Academies in India
- Sainik school
