= Telangana State Sports School =

Indian school in Hyderabad

- Type: Sports school
- Established: 1993
- Students: 409 (223 boys and 186 girls)
- Location: Rajiv Gandhi Rahadari, Hakimpet, Telangana, 500078, India; 17.556021°N 78.5448606°E
- Campus: Suburban, 206 acres (83.4 ha)
- Location within Telangana Location within India

Telangana State Sports School (TSSS) is a sports school belonging to Government of Telangana located at Hakimpet, Hyderabad. It offers students training along with education at the school. It bagged best sports school in India – 2017 at SFA Hyderabad Championship. The school students bagged over 100 medals at international and over 1800 medals at the national level sports events.

== Campus ==
The school started in 1993 on 206 acres at Thumkunta near Hakimpet Air Force Station. The sports offered at the school include kabaddi, archery, gymnastics, judo, volleyball, football, water sports (rowing, sailing, kayaking and canoeing), sepak takraw, and track and field athletics.

There is an indoor stadium for gymnastics, 400 metre track, archery ground, football ground, volleyball courts, weightlifting hall and a conditioning hall.

L

== Notable alumni ==
- Satti Geetha – 4 × 400 m relay event (2004 & 2008 Olympics)
- Manoj – Archery
- D. Sai Raj – Bronze medalist at 2017 Asian Rowing Championship in Pattaya, Thailand
- Ragala Venkat Rahul – 85 kg weightlifting, Gold Medalist, Commonwealth Games 2018
- Varun Ragala, 78 kg weightlifting, Gold Medalist, Commonwealth Games 2018
- Erra Deexitha – Gold at Commonwealth Weightlifting Championships 2017, Gold Coast, Australia.

== See also ==
- Education in India
- List of schools in India
- List of institutions of higher education in Telangana
