= Rajiv Gandhi International Airport =

Airport serving Hyderabad, Telangana, India

- IATA: HYD; ICAO: VOHS; WMO: 43128

Summary
- Airport type: Public
- Owner/Operator: GMR Hyderabad International Airport Limited (GHIAL): GMR Group (74%); Airports Authority of India (13%); Government of Telangana (13%)
- Serves: Hyderabad Metropolitan Region
- Location: Shamshabad, Hyderabad, Telangana, India
- Opened: 23 March 2008; 18 years ago
- Hub for: Alliance Air; Amazon Air; Blue Dart Aviation; IndiGo; SpiceJet; Star Air
- Focus city for: Air India
- Operating base for: Air India Express
- Time zone: IST (UTC+05:30)
- Elevation AMSL: 2,030 ft (620 m)
- Coordinates: 17°13′48″N 78°25′55″E
- Website: www.hyderabad.aero

Map
- Location of airport in Telangana HYD/VOHS (India)

Runways
Direction	Length		Surface
Direction	m	ft	Surface
09L/27R	3,707	12,162	Asphalt
09R/27L	4,260	13,976	Asphalt

Statistics (April 2025 – March 2026)
- Passengers: 30,483,885 (▲3.4%)
- Aircraft movements: 207,900 (▲2.8%)
- Cargo tonnage: 182,440 (▲10.0%)
- Source: AAI, AIM India / eAIS Package

Rajiv Gandhi International Airport (IATA: HYD, ICAO: VOHS) is an international airport that serves Hyderabad, the capital of the Indian state of Telangana. It is located in Shamshabad, about 24 kilometres (15 mi) south of Hyderabad and it was opened on 23 March 2008 to replace Begumpet Airport, which was till then the sole civilian airport serving Hyderabad. It is owned and operated by GMR Hyderabad International Airport Limited (GHIAL), a public–private consortium. It was the first airport in India to launch domestic e-boarding facility in December 2015, followed with international e-boarding facility in October 2020, and ranked in AirHelp's list of top 10 airports in the world. The fourth-busiest airport in India by passenger traffic, it handled over 29 million passengers and over 167,660 tonnes (184,810 short tons) of cargo between April 2024 and March 2025.

It was named after Rajiv Gandhi, the former Prime Minister of India. Built over an area of 2,200 hectares (5,500 acres), it is the largest airport of India by area. The airport has an integrated passenger terminal, a cargo terminal and two runways. There are also aviation training facilities, a fuel farm, a solar power plant and two maintenance, repair, and operations (MRO) facilities.

== History ==
=== Planning (1991–2004) ===
The existing commercial airport, Begumpet Airport, was unable to handle rising passenger traffic. The State Government initially considered converting Hakimpet Air Force Station to civilian use; however, the Air Force refused. When the State proposed the construction of a new airport for the Air Force, the Ministry of Defence suggested the State consider sites south of Begumpet Airport. By October 1998, the State had narrowed down to three possible locations for the new airport: Bongloor, Nadergul and Shamshabad. Due to its convenient location near two highways (NH 44 and NH 765) and a railway line, Shamshabad was selected in December 1998.

In November 2000, under the N. Chandrababu Naidu government and the Airports Authority of India (AAI) signed a memorandum of understanding on the greenfield airport project, establishing it as a public–private partnership. The State and AAI together would hold a 26% stake in the project, while the remaining 74% would be allotted to private companies. Through a bidding process the consortium consisting of Grandhi Mallikarjuna Rao (GMR Group) and Malaysia Airports Holdings Berhad was selected as the holder of the 74% stake.

In December 2002, Hyderabad International Airport Ltd (HIAL), later renamed GMR Hyderabad International Airport Limited (GHIAL), was created as a special purpose entity, into which the State, AAI and GMR–MAHB placed their stakes.

In September 2003, the members of GHIAL signed a shareholders' agreement, as well as an agreement for state subsidy of over ₹4 billion (US$43 million). A concession agreement between GHIAL and the Central Government was signed in December 2004, stipulating that no airport within a 150-kilometre (93 mi) radius of RGIA could be operated. Thus, the closure of Begumpet Airport was required.

=== Construction and opening (2005–2008) ===
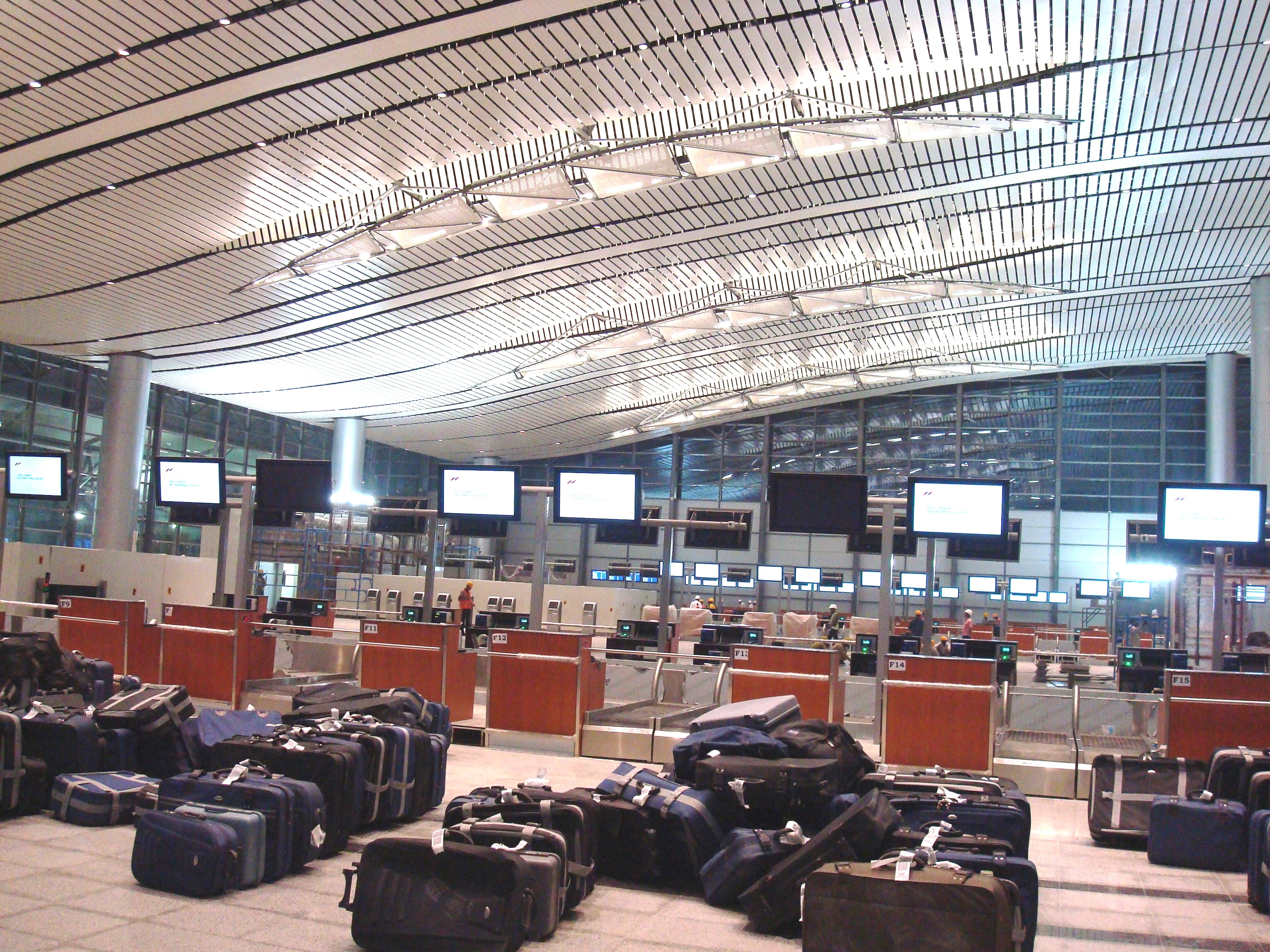
The interior of the airport in 2008

The project was forwarded when Y. S. Rajasekhara Reddy gained power and construction began by GMR on 16 March 2005 when Sonia Gandhi laid the foundation stone. Two days prior, the Central Government had named the airport after former Prime Minister Rajiv Gandhi, who had undergone pilot training in Hyderabad. The naming resulted in opposition from the Telugu Desam Party (TDP). At Begumpet Airport, the international terminal was named after Rajiv Gandhi while the domestic terminal was named after TDP founder N. T. Rama Rao; TDP wanted to continue this naming convention at the new airport. However, the new airport has only one terminal.

Roughly three years after the foundation stone laying ceremony, the airport was inaugurated on 14 March 2008 amid protests. TDP repeated its demand for the naming of the domestic terminal. In addition, on 12 and 13 March, 20,000 AAI employees had conducted a strike against the closure of Begumpet Airport, as well as that of HAL Airport in Bangalore, fearing they would lose their jobs.

RGIA was originally scheduled to open to commercial operations on 16 March 2008; however, the date was delayed due to protests from some airlines over the high ground handling rates at the airport. Once the rates were reduced, the launch date was set for 23 March 2008. Although Lufthansa Flight 752 from Frankfurt was scheduled to be the first flight to land at RGIA, two SpiceJet flights landed earlier. However, the Lufthansa flight still received the planned ceremonial welcome upon its 12:25 am arrival.

Rajiv Gandhi International Airport reassigned the IATA airport code, HYD, from Begumpet Airport after the previous airport ceased international commercial flights.

=== Later developments (2009–present) ===
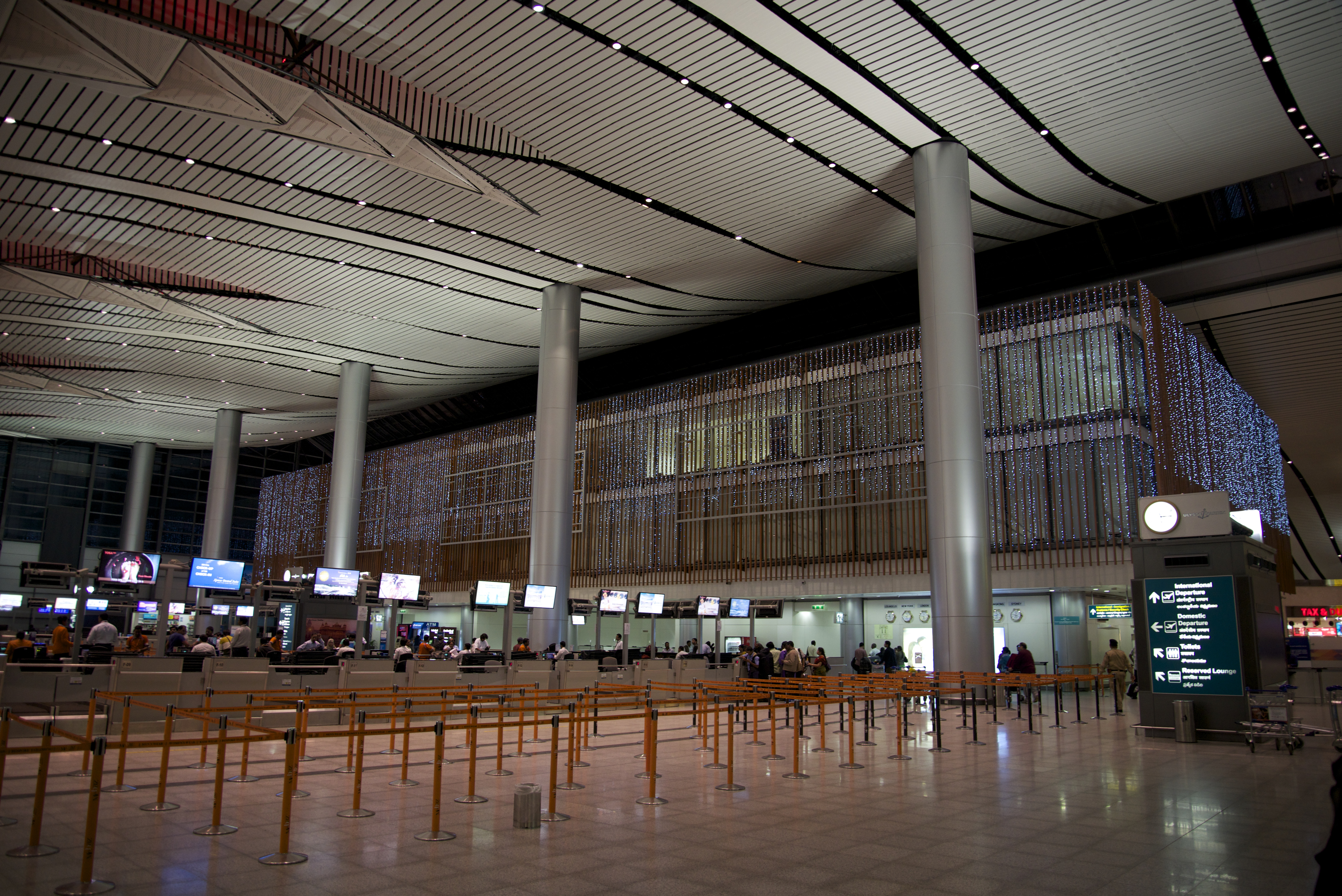
Check-in area of the terminal

In September 2011, SpiceJet launched its regional hub at RGIA, using its new Bombardier Q400 aircraft. The airline, which chose Hyderabad due to its central location in the country, flies to several Tier-II and Tier-III cities from the airport. Regional airline TruJet too opened a hub at RGIA upon commencing operations in July 2015.

In November 2014, the Ministry of Civil Aviation resolved that the domestic terminal of RGIA would be named after N. T. Rama Rao, resulting in protests from members of the Rajya Sabha. Airport officials remained unsure as to how the naming would occur.

== Ownership ==
RGIA is owned and operated by GMR Hyderabad International Airport Ltd (GHIAL), a public–private venture. It is composed of the private firm, GMR Group (74%) and the public entities, Airports Authority of India (13%) and the Government of Telangana (13%). Previously, GMR Group had a consortium with Malaysia Airports Holdings Berhad, in which it held a share of 11% and GMR Group shared 63% in owning the airport. Per the concession agreement between GHIAL and the Central Government, GHIAL has the right to operate the airport for 30 years, with the option to continue doing so for another 30 years. In May 2022, the Central Government extended the concession agreement term of GHIAL from 23 March 2038, up to 22 March 2068. In October 2023, GMR Group informed in a release announcing the signing of Sales and Purchase Agreement (SPA) that it had decided to acquire the 11% stake of Malaysia Airports Holdings Berhad, thus raising its overall stake to 74%. Hence, Malaysia Airports Holdings Berhad withdrew from the ownership, and GMR Group took over its stake in January 2024.

== Facilities ==
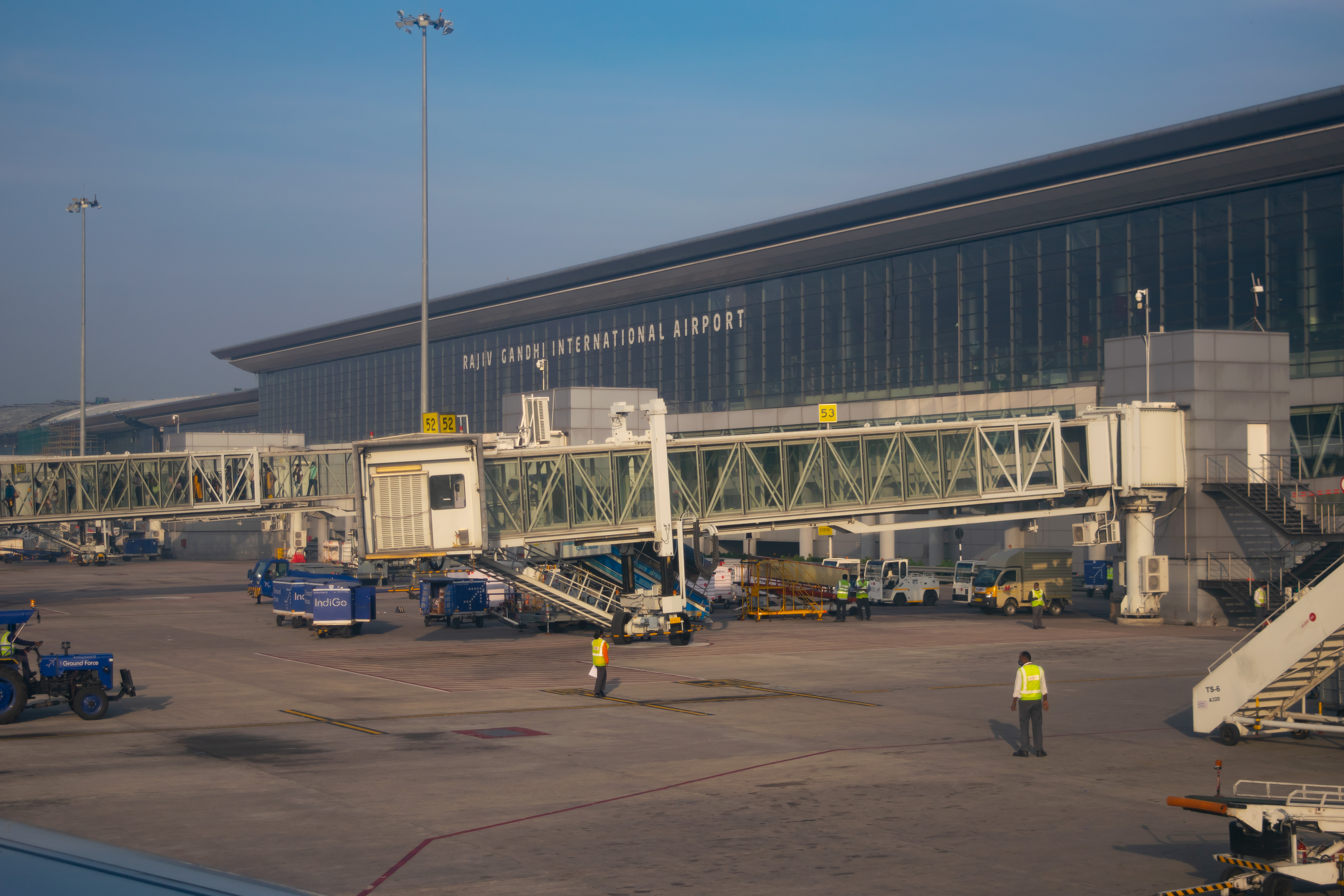
Terminal building as seen from airside

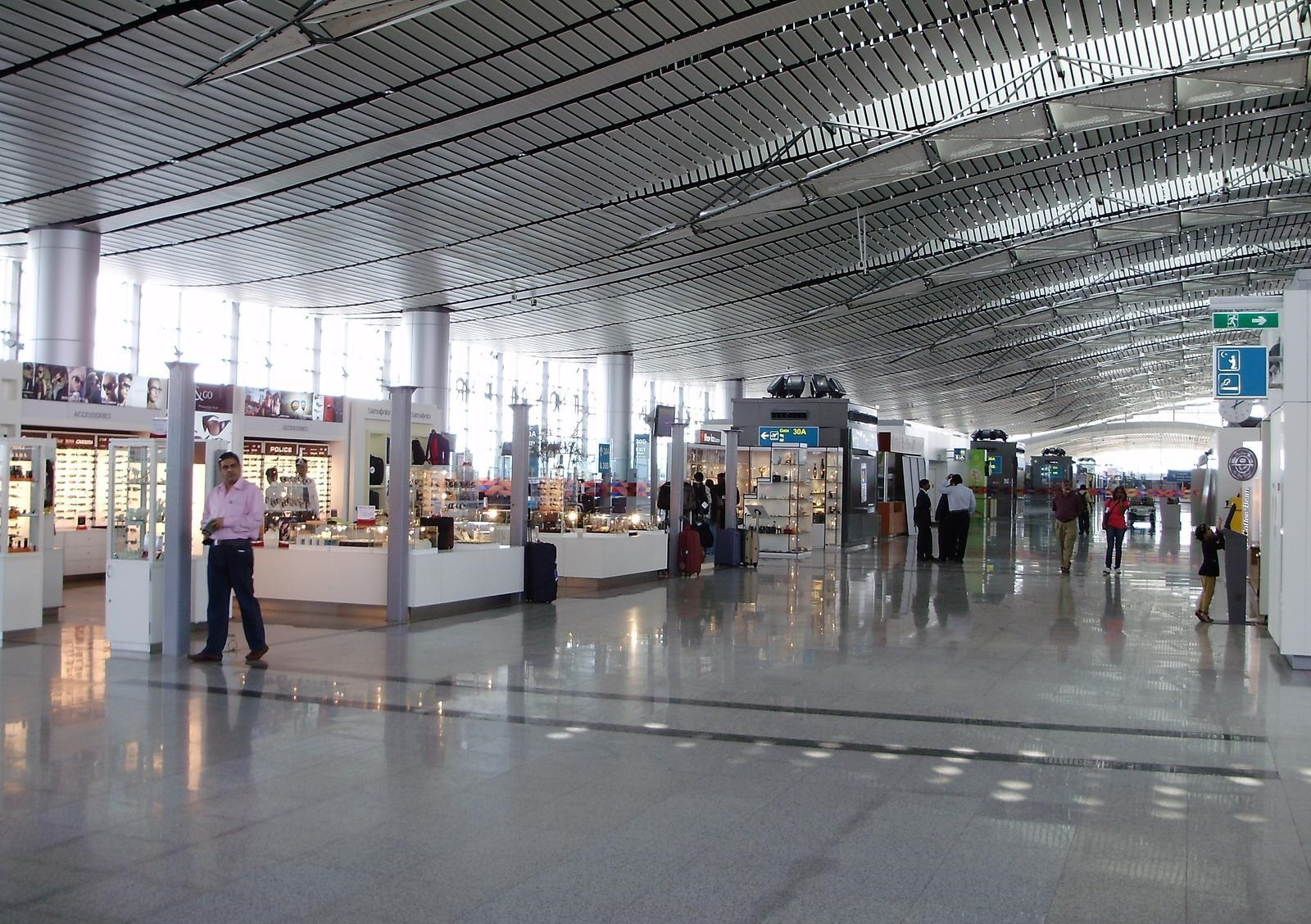
Departures area

=== Structure ===
The airport is spread over 2,200 hectares (5,500 acres). Out of which 810 hectares (2,000 acres) have been developed towards airport needs which mainly constitutes 690 hectares (1,700 acres) of land is airside and 120 hectares (300 acres) of land is landside facilities. The remaining 1,414 hectares (3,495 acres) is expansion of the airport. No further land will be acquired. The airport is fully planned within 2,200 hectares (5,500 acres).

=== Runways ===
The airport has two runways:

- Runway 09L/27R: 3,707 by 45 metres (12,162 ft × 148 ft)
- Runway 09R/27L: 4,260 by 60 metres (13,980 ft × 200 ft), ILS equipped

Runway 09R/27L, the original and primary runway, is long enough to be able to receive the Airbus A380 which is the world's largest passenger aircraft. Originally a taxiway, runway 09L/27R was inaugurated in February 2012. Its length is shorter than the main runway and able to handle aircraft such as the Airbus A340 and Boeing 747. It is mainly used when runway 09R/27L is undergoing maintenance, and as air traffic to the airport rises it will be used more often. North of these runways are the three parking aprons: the cargo, passenger terminal and MRO aprons. The passenger terminal apron contains parking stands on both the north and south sides of the terminal. Rajiv Gandhi International Airport, Hyderabad was the first international airport in south India to have a parallel runway at the time of inauguration of the second runway in February 2012 respectively.

=== Terminal ===
The original terminal was designed to handle 12 million passengers. It had a built-up area of 117,000 m^{2} (1,260,000 sq ft). In November 2023, the terminal was expanded towards the eastern side and in September 2024, the terminal was expanded towards western side. Its total operational area is 379,370 m^{2} (4,083,500 sq ft). With the expanded terminal, the passenger capacity has been increased to 40 million passengers per annum. The expanded area now has 56 remote bus domestic departure gates and arrival facilities, 44 passenger boarding aero bridges, contact stands, and a domestic-to-domestic (D-D) transfer area. Furthermore, this area is equipped with three ATRS machines, one screening machine and 12 departure gates. The western side of the terminal handles international flights while the eastern side is for domestic operations. After expansion of the terminal in November 2023, there are 20 immigration counters and 87 check-in desks with 14 kiosks for self check-in. There are ten baggage claim belts with a total running length of 840 meters with seven for Domestic and three for International. Public lounge facilities are provided by Encalm Lounge, which operates three lounges in the terminal; there are also three separate lounges for VIPs. The pre-security "airport village" is a meeting point for passenger pick-up.

The terminal supports entry through the Digi Yatra check-in system.

=== Air Traffic Control ===
The Air Traffic Control (ATC) tower at the Rajiv Gandhi International Airport (RGIA) stands at a height of 75 metres (246 ft).

== Airlines and destinations ==
=== Passenger ===
Airlines	Destinations
Air Arabia	Sharjah
Air India	Delhi, Mumbai
Air India Express	Abu Dhabi, Bengaluru, Dubai–International, Goa–Dabolim, Goa–Mopa, Guwahati, Jeddah, Mangaluru, Navi Mumbai, Phuket, Pune, Ranchi, Siliguri, Tirupati, Vijayawada, Visakhapatnam
AirAsia	Kuala Lumpur–International
Akasa Air	Darbhanga, (Note: Darbhanga is continuation of Delhi flight as the same flight number.) Delhi
Alliance Air	Bengaluru, Chennai, Pune, Tirupati, Vidyanagar
British Airways	London–Heathrow
Cathay Pacific	Hong Kong
Centrum Air	Tashkent
Emirates	Dubai–International
Ethiopian Airlines	Addis Ababa
Etihad Airways	Abu Dhabi
Fly91	Goa–Mopa, Hubli, Jalgaon, Rajamahendravaram, Sindhudurg, Solapur, Tirupati, Vijayawada
Flyadeal	Riyadh
Flydubai	Dubai–International
Flynas	Riyadh
Gulf Air	Bahrain
IndiGo	Abu Dhabi, Ahmedabad Aurangabad, Ayodhya, Bahrain, Bangkok–Suvarnabhumi, Belgaum, Bengaluru, Bhopal, Bhubaneswar, Chandigarh, Chennai, Coimbatore, Colombo–Bandaranaike, Dammam, Darbhanga, Dehradun, Delhi, Dhaka, Doha, Dubai–International, Durgapur, Goa–Dabolim, Goa–Mopa, Gorakhpur, Guwahati, Hubli, Indore, Jabalpur, Jagdalpur, Jaipur, Jeddah, Jodhpur, Kadapa, Kannur, Kochi, Kolhapur, Kolkata, Kozhikode, Kuwait City, Lucknow, Madurai, Mangaluru, Medina, Mumbai, Muscat, Mysore, Nagpur, Nashik, Navi Mumbai, Noida, Patna, Pondicherry, Port Blair, Prayagraj, Pune, Purnea, Raipur, Rajamahendravaram, Rajkot, Ranchi, Ras Al Khaimah, Riyadh, Salem, Sharjah, Shirdi, Singapore, Srinagar, Surat, Thiruvananthapuram, Tiruchirapalli, Tirupati, Udaipur, Vadodara, Varanasi, Vijayawada, Visakhapatnam
Jazeera Airways	Kuwait City
KLM	Amsterdam
Kuwait Airways	Kuwait City
Lufthansa	Frankfurt
Malaysia Airlines	Kuala Lumpur–International
Nok Air	Bangkok–Don Mueang
Oman Air	Muscat
Qatar Airways	Doha
SalamAir	Muscat
Saudia	Jeddah
Singapore Airlines	Singapore
SpiceJet	Ayodhya, Chennai, Delhi, Mumbai, Patna, Pune, Shimoga (ends 21 November 2026), Varanasi
SriLankan Airlines	Colombo–Bandaranaike
Star Air	Belgaum, Bengaluru, Bhubaneswar, Jharsuguda, Kolhapur, Mumbai, Nagpur, Nanded, Pune, Shimoga (ends 21 November 2026), Tirupati
Thai AirAsia	Bangkok–Don Mueang
Thai Airways International	Bangkok–Suvarnabhumi
VietJet Air	Ho Chi Minh City
Vietnam Airlines	Hanoi

=== Cargo ===
Airlines	Destinations	Refs.
Air Tanzania	Dar es Salaam, Guangzhou	
Amazon Air	Bengaluru, Delhi, Mumbai	
Blue Dart Aviation	Ahmedabad, Bengaluru, Chennai, Delhi, Kolkata, Mumbai	
Emirates SkyCargo	Dubai–Al Maktoum	
Ethiopian Cargo	Addis Ababa	
Lufthansa Cargo	Frankfurt, Mumbai	
Oman Air Cargo	Muscat	
Qatar Airways Cargo	Doha	
Turkish Cargo	Doha, Dubai–Al Maktoum, Istanbul, Phnom Penh	

== Statistics ==
Busiest domestic routes from HYD (2023–24)
Rank	Airport	Carriers	Departing passengers
1	Delhi	Air India, Akasa Air, IndiGo, SpiceJet	1,526,514
2	Bengaluru, Karnataka	Air India, Air India Express, Akasa Air, Alliance Air, IndiGo, Star Air	1,123,823
3	Mumbai, Maharashtra	Air India, Akasa Air, IndiGo	1,114,072
4	Chennai, Tamil Nadu	Air India, Air India Express, Alliance Air, IndiGo	665,920
5	Kolkata, West Bengal	Air India Express, IndiGo	536,379
6	Goa–Dabolim, Goa	Air India Express, IndiGo	424,531
7	Visakhapatnam, Andhra Pradesh	Air India Express, IndiGo	406,826
8	Kochi, Kerala	Air India Express, IndiGo	335,873
9	Tirupati, Andhra Pradesh	Air India, Alliance Air, IndiGo, SpiceJet, Star Air	314,477
10	Jaipur, Rajasthan	Air India Express, IndiGo	289,085

Busiest international routes from HYD (2023–24)
Rank	Airport	Carriers	Departing passengers
1	Dubai, United Arab Emirates	Air India, Emirates, Flydubai, IndiGo	523,107
2	Doha, Qatar	IndiGo, Qatar Airways	232,761
3	Abu Dhabi, United Arab Emirates	Etihad Airways, IndiGo	217,592
4	Jeddah, Saudi Arabia	Air India Express, IndiGo, Saudia	180,917
5	Singapore	IndiGo, Singapore Airlines	165,147
6	Muscat, Oman	IndiGo, Oman Air, SalamAir	148,268
7	Sharjah, United Arab Emirates	Air Arabia, IndiGo	114,139
8	Kuala Lumpur, Malaysia	AirAsia, Malaysia Airlines	112,704
9	Riyadh, Saudi Arabia	Air India Express, Flynas, IndiGo	96,339
10	Bangkok–Suvarnabhumi, Thailand	IndiGo, Thai Airways International	83,813

== GMR Aerospace Park ==
The GMR Aerospace Park contains several facilities primarily related to the aviation sector. It has a 100-hectare (250-acre) special economic zone, which includes an 8.1-hectare (20-acre) Free Trade and Warehousing Zone, as well as a domestic tariff area.

=== Aviation training ===
The GMR Aviation Academy is located in the park. It was established in 2009 in co-operation with the International Air Transport Association (IATA), International Civil Aviation Organization (ICAO), Airports Council International (ACI) and the Directorate General of Civil Aviation (DGCA). The academy offers programmes related to airport operations, which are accredited by the listed organisations. The park also includes the Asia Pacific Flight Training (APFT) academy, an initiative of GMR Group and Asia Pacific Flight Training. Launched in 2013, it provides pilot training courses.

=== GMR Aero Technic Ltd MRO ===
The MRO operated by GMR Aero Technic Ltd is one of two MROs at the airport. Built at a cost of ₹3.5 billion (US$37 million) and inaugurated in March 2012, the facility can handle up to five aircraft simultaneously. Initially, the MRO was a joint venture between GMR Group and Malaysian Aerospace Engineering (MAE), a subsidiary of Malaysia Airlines. However, amid its parent's poor financial situation following the Malaysia Airlines Flight 370 incident, MAE was unable to fund the MRO, which had been accruing losses. GMR bought out MAE's stake in December 2014.

GMR Aero Technic Ltd is the only one MRO in private sector in India with extensive capability to maintain Airbus A320, Boeing 737, ATR 72/42 and Bombardier DHC Q400 aircraft. GMR Aero Technic is a world class aircraft maintenance organisation approved by EASA and Directorate General of Civil Aviation (India) and various civil aviation authorities and one of the few MROs certified for AS9110 standards in South East Asia region.

== Other facilities ==
=== Air India MRO ===
The other MRO is operated by Air India Engineering Services Limited (AIESL), a subsidiary of Air India. Spread over 2 hectares (5 acres), the facility cost ₹790 million (equivalent to ₹1.3 billion or US$14 million in 2026) to construct and was opened in May 2015.

=== Cargo terminal ===
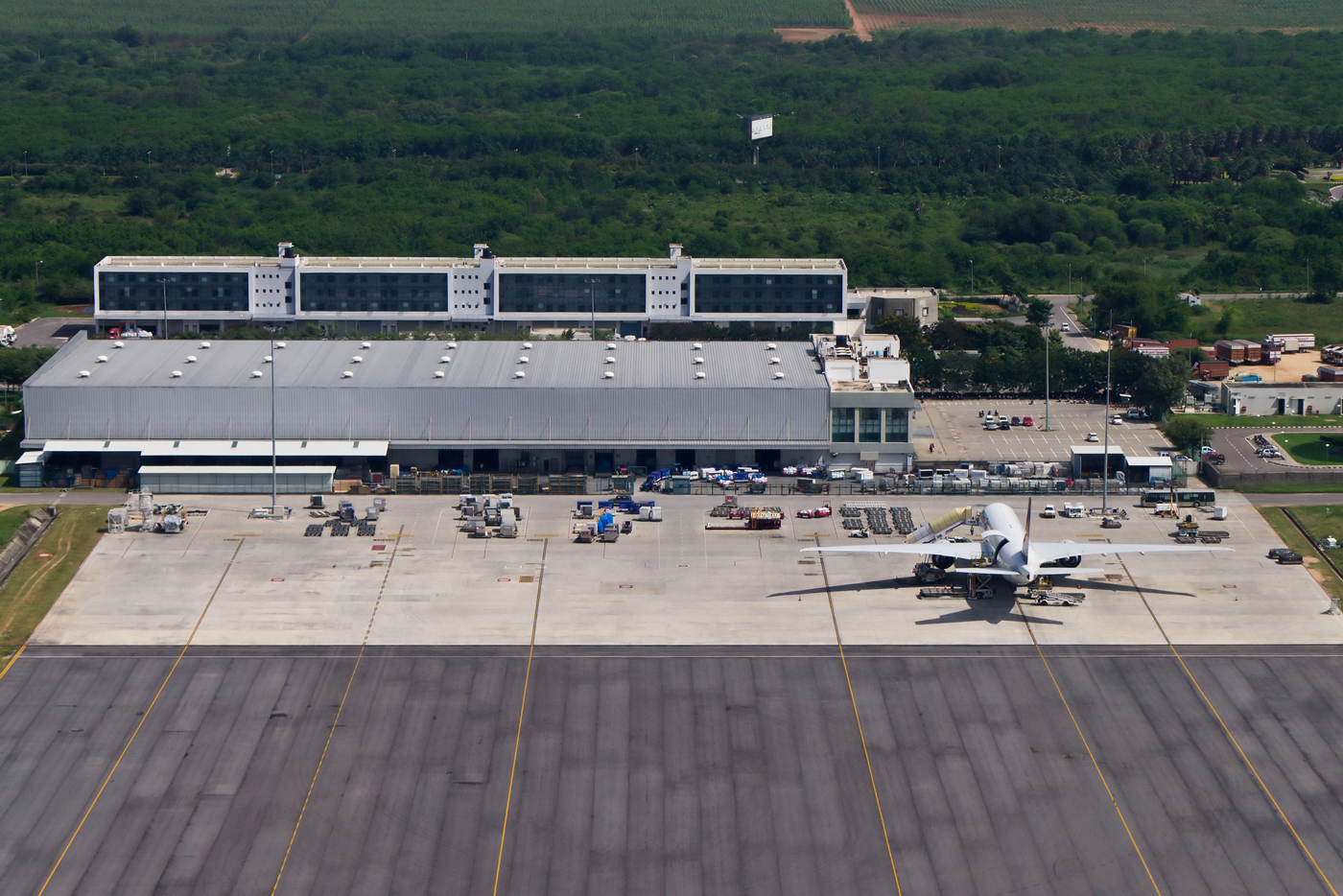
The cargo terminal, with a Lufthansa Cargo Boeing 777F being unloaded

The cargo terminal is located west of the passenger terminal. It covers 14,330 square metres (154,200 sq ft) and can handle 150,000 tonnes (170,000 short tons) of cargo annually. The terminal is operated by Hyderabad Menzies Air Cargo Pvt Ltd, a joint venture between GHIAL (51%) and Menzies Aviation (49%). Within the terminal is the Pharma Zone, a temperature-controlled facility designed for storing pharmaceuticals. The first such facility to be opened at an Indian airport, it is important to RGIA as pharmaceuticals account for 70% of exports from the airport. In May 2011, Lufthansa Cargo launched its first pharma hub at the airport.

=== Fuel farm ===
The airport has a fuel farm consisting of six storage tanks of which 4 are filled, with a total capacity for 13,500 kilolitres (480,000 cu ft) of jet fuel. The tanks are connected to the apron via underground pipelines. Reliance Industries built and operates the farm, which can be used by any oil company under an open-access model.

=== Solar power plant ===
In January 2016, GHIAL commissioned a 5 MW solar power plant near RGIA, which will be used to serve the airport's energy needs. It was built over 9.7 hectares (24 acres) at a cost of ₹300 million (US$3.2 million). Over the following two to three years, the capacity of the plant will be raised to 30 MW, allowing RGIA to become fully solar powered.

=== Airport hotel ===
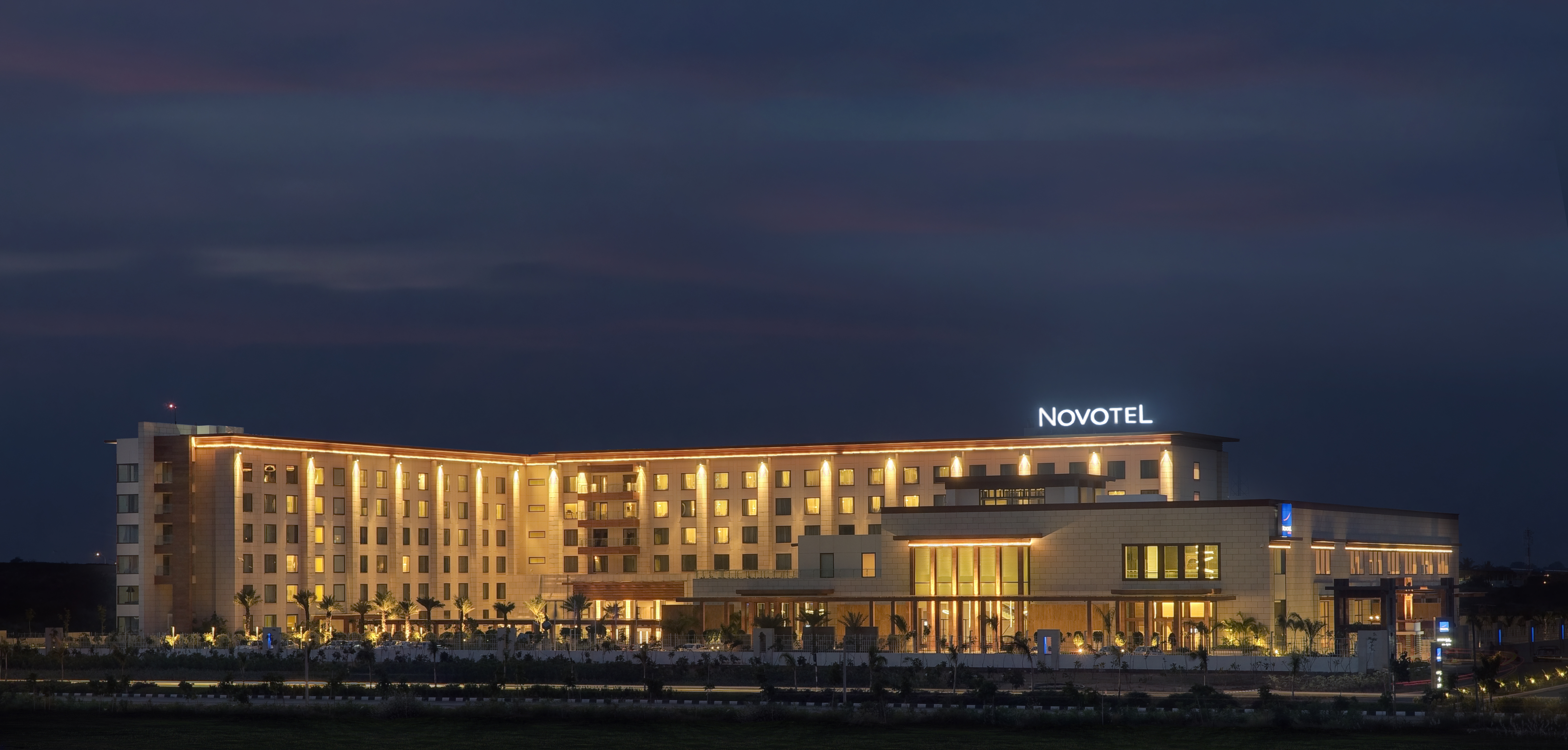
Novotel hotel at Hyderabad Airport

The Novotel Hyderabad Airport, located 3.5 kilometres (2.2 mi) from RGIA, was opened in October 2008. The hotel includes 305 rooms, two restaurants and a lounge for aircrew. It was initially owned by GHIAL before being shifted to subsidiary GMR Hotels and Resorts Ltd. Owing to high losses from low occupancy, GMR began seeking buyers of the hotel in August 2015.

=== Kartainment Go Karting Track ===
Kartainment is a professional racing and recreational Go- Karting track located in the GMR Rajiv Gandhi Hyderabad International Airport, Shamshabad. It is made up of 900 meter professional track and 600 meter recreational Go-Karting track.

=== Aero Plaza ===
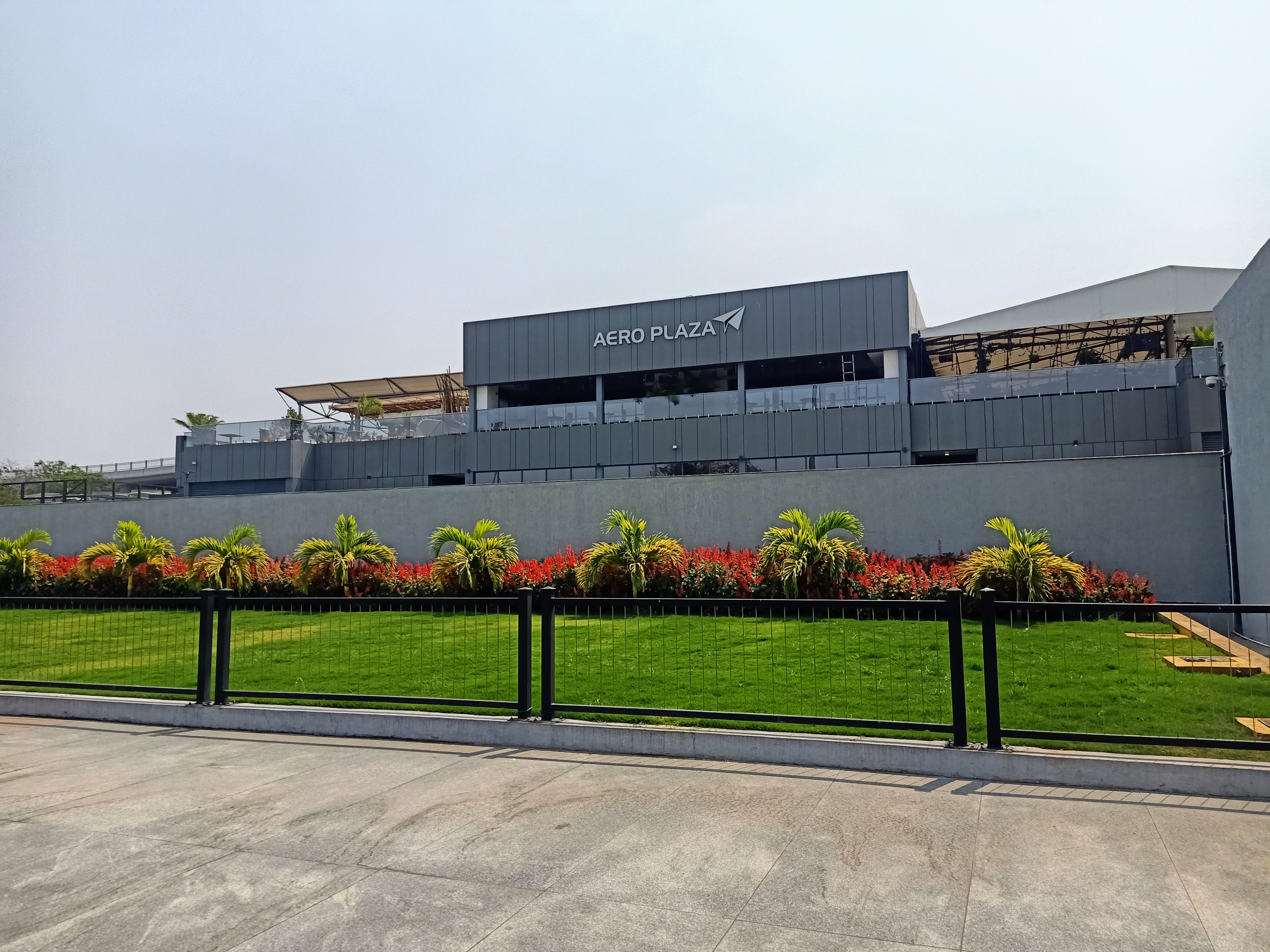
Aero Plaza Hyderabad Airport

Aero Plaza is located within the main terminal of the airport. Spread over two floors, it was inaugurated in 2022.

=== GMR Aerocity Hyderabad ===
In April 2021, GMR Group announced the launch of GMR Hyderabad Airport City, which is proposed to be the largest aerotropolis in India spread across 6.1 square kilometres (1,500 acres) around Rajiv Gandhi International Airport, and is being billed as an "integrated ecosystem covering office space, retail, leisure, entertainment, hospitality, education, healthcare, aerospace & logistics".

== Ground transport ==
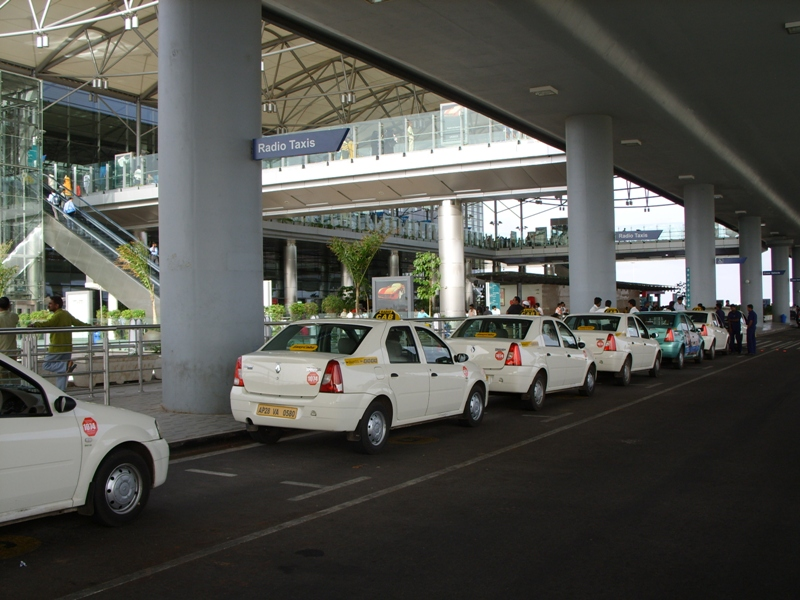
Taxi stand outside the terminal

=== Road ===
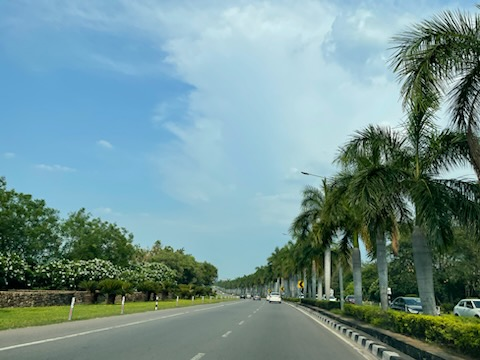
Airport Approach Road, RGIA, Hyderabad, Telangana

RGIA is connected to the city of Hyderabad by NH 44, NH 765 and the Outer Ring Road. In October 2009, the PV Narasimha Rao Expressway was completed between Mehdipatnam and Aramghar, where it joins NH 44. This long flyover, which is 13 km (8.1 mi), has reduced travel time between the airport and the city to 30–40 minutes and also provides three entry and exit points.

The "Pushpak – Airport Liner" service of the Telangana State Road Transport Corporation provides bus transportation to different parts of the city. It was launched in December 2012 to replace GMR's Aero Express service.

=== Metro ===
Under the second phase of the Hyderabad Metro Rail project, a 31-kilometre (19 mi) rail link between Raidurg and RGIA will be constructed. As of late 2015, feasibility studies on the phase are underway. In August 2019, K. T. Rama Rao said that state cabinet has approved the Hyderabad Airport Metro Express Link from Raidurg to the airport. The alignment to Shamshabad RGI Airport from the Raidurg metro station will be passing over Bio-diversity Junction, through Roda Mistry college lane, Khajaguda Junction. The 31-kilometre-long (19 mi) Hyderabad Airport Metro Express link will cost around ₹62.5 billion (equivalent to ₹85 billion or US$910 million in 2026). In September 2021, GMR Group, the company operating the Rajiv Gandhi International Airport (RGIA) in Hyderabad said that it will invest ₹5.2 billion (equivalent to ₹6.4 billion or US$68 million in 2026) towards metro connectivity at the airport. During the foundation laying ceremony on 9 December 2022, GMR Group contributed ₹6.25 billion (equivalent to ₹7.2 billion or US$77 million in 2026), or 10 per cent of the project's cost.

This plan was later scrapped due to the change in government. The route was rerouted to the new line being built in Phase-II. This new line would begin in Nagole and go through Chandrayangutta before coming to RGIA.

The closest Indian Railways station is Umdanagar, which is 6 km (3.7 mi) from the airport.

== Future plans ==
In 2009, GHIAL decided to postpone the second phase due to lower growth in passenger traffic than anticipated. The phase was revived in late 2015, as the airport is expected to reach its capacity in 2016. The first leg of this phase will bring the capacity to 18 million passengers annually, and the second leg will raise it to 20 million. The passenger terminal will be enlarged with additional security lanes, check-in counters and other facilities, and solar panels will be built on the roof. In October 2017, GHIAL CEO SGK Kishore confirmed that the airport expansion would start by January 2018, and it is expected to be completed by the end of 2019. The passenger terminal is being expanded to handle 34 million passengers per year. But due to the ongoing COVID-19 pandemic, which caused lockdowns, restrictions and curfews, it resulted in lack of labour and delays in work. Construction work has resumed as of mid 2021, and now it is expected to be completed by 2023.

In the midst of the expansion to 25 million, the grant for the 50 million PPA expansion was awarded. The master plan of the airport involves construction of new runways and the terminal on the north side of the airport approach road which replicates the existing runways and terminal on the south of approach road. New cross taxiways will be built on east & west of terminals connecting the runways on north and south of the approach road. The approach road tunnel will be built under the new taxiways which allows free flow of traffic entering airport from ORR/Bangalore Highway junction and Srisailam Highway as well. The final phase of expansion will increase the terminal capacity to 80 million passengers annually.

== See also ==
- List of airports in India
- List of the busiest airports in India
- List of airports in Telangana
- Warangal Airport
