= Warangal Airport =

- IATA: WGC; ICAO: VOWA

Summary
- Airport type: Public
- Owner: Airports Authority of India
- Operator: Airports Authority of India
- Location: Warangal, Telangana, India
- Opened: 1930; 96 years ago
- Closed: 1981; 45 years ago
- Elevation AMSL: 935 ft (285 m)
- Coordinates: 17°55′00″N 79°36′00″E

Map
- Location of the airport in Telangana WGC (India)

Runways
Direction	Length		Surface
Direction	ft	m	Surface
09/27	6,000	1,829	N/A
15/33	6,000	1,829	N/A

Warangal Airport (IATA: WGC, ICAO: VOWA), also known as Mamnoor Airport, is a domestic airport located at Mamnoor, Warangal, Telangana, India. The airport is currently undergoing re-development under the UDAN scheme. It is one of the two public airports located in the state of Telangana. There are plans to name this airport after Rudrama Devi as Kakatiya Maharani Rudrama Devi Airport.

== History ==
Warangal Airport was originally constructed in the 1930s by the last Nizam of Hyderabad State, Mir Osman Ali Khan along with one at Solapur, to benefit the businesses, at Kagaznagar for the paper industry's convenience, and to help industries like the Azam Jahi Mills at Warangal.

During World War II, the Mamnoor airstrip was used by the British army after being handed over by the Nizam as a friendly gesture. The airstrip was damaged when two Hawker Tempest of the Indian Air Force bombed it during Operation Polo in September1948. In 1959, Jawaharlal Nehru landed at the airstrip to lay the foundation stone for the first Regional Engineering College in Warangal. During the 1962 war with China, the IAF parked some of its aircraft at Mamnoor because of the remoteness of its location from the conflict zone. In the 1970s, the NCC Air Wing began conducting programmes for cadets at the airfield using gliders. Regional carrier Vayudoot operated to Warangal briefly from 1987, after which there were no more commercial services to the airport.

In March 2007, the then undivided Andhra Pradesh government entered into a memorandum of understanding (MoU) with the AAI for the development of Mamnoor airport for operation of ATR-72 aircraft. However, those efforts were stalled because of the exclusivity clause of the Central Government's agreement with the operators of Rajiv Gandhi International Airport (RGIA)

=== Revival plans ===
In September 2020, the Government of Telangana planned to acquire 200 acres of additional land around the airport for its revival. The state government also requested the Ministry of Civil Aviation for the airport to be included in the Government of India's UDAN scheme. The Central Government added Warangal to the UDAN scheme in 2022. A joint inspection team was formed to expedite the survey process in 2023.

On 31 July 2023, following a new survey, the State Cabinet of Telangana approved the proposal to develop Mamnoor Airport. In November 2024, the Telangana government approved Rs 205 crore for acquiring over 280 acres of land to facilitate the development of the airport. This decision followed the issuance of a "No Objection Certificate" (NoC) from the GMR Group which manages Hyderabad's RGIA.

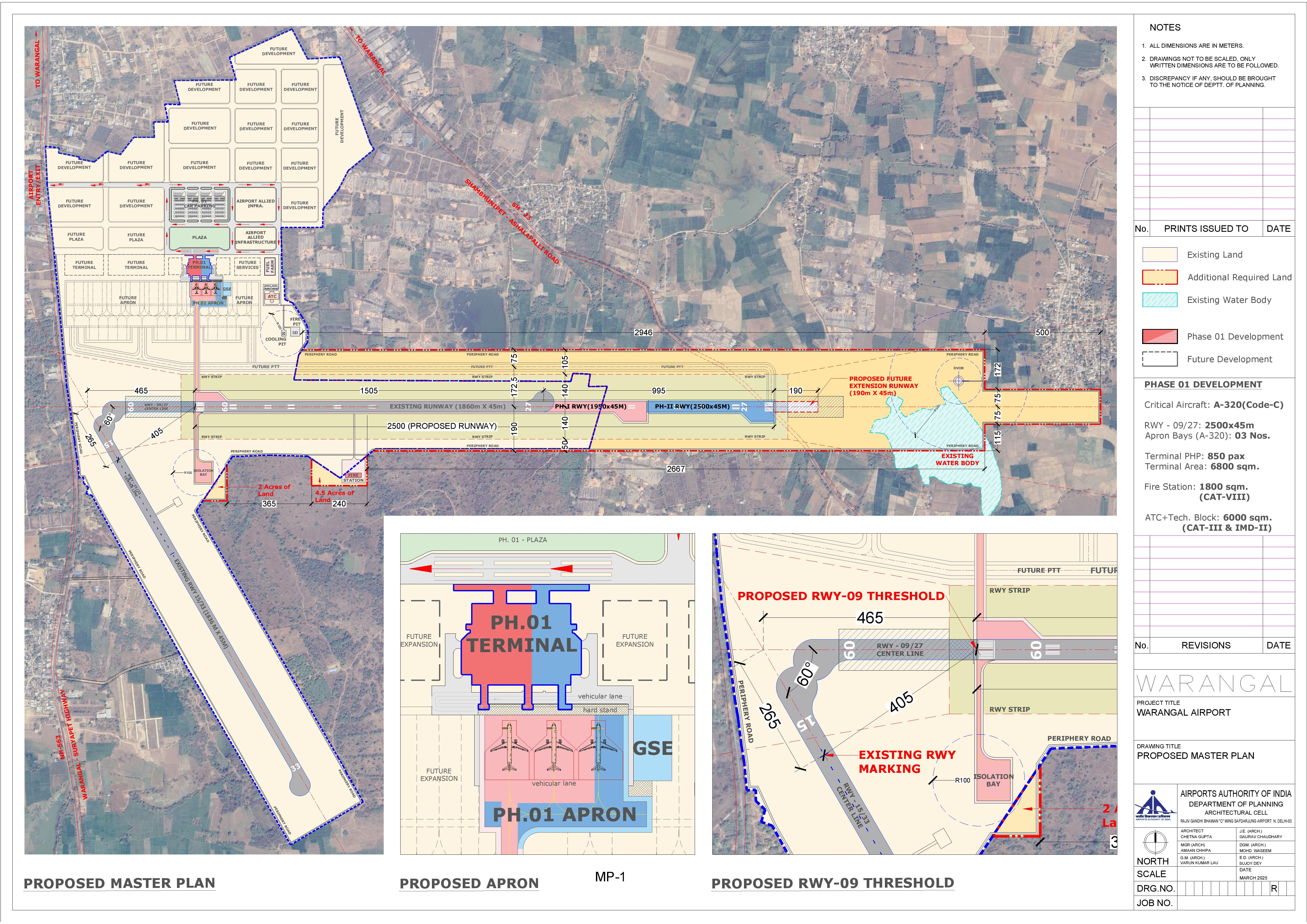
Proposed Warangal Airport Masterplan By AAI

AAI has Informed Telangana government that they will take up development of Warangal International Airport in Phase 2 for IFR Operations for A320 type aircraft Proposed Runway Length - 2.9km Total Project Cost - Rs.592 Crs (if it was started in 2021 and completed by March 2024) The Central government approved the development and operationalisation of the airport in February 2025, waiving the exclusivity clause that restricted new airport developments within 150 km of Hyderabad International Airport.

On 27 December 2025, the Telangana Government officially handed over an additional 253 acres of land to the Airports Authority of India (AAI).

In 2026, Union Civil Aviation Minister Kinjarapu Ram Mohan Naidu stated that the redevelopment of Mamnoor Airport would be completed within two to two-and-a-half years. The proposed development includes a 2,500-metre runway, a modern terminal building, an air traffic control tower, and comprehensive firefighting and security infrastructure.

In September 2026, call for the tender of re-construction of the Warangal Airport was issued by AAI.

== Infrastructure ==
Warangal Airport was the largest airport in the country at the time, with 1,875-acre (7.59 km^{2}) in land, a 1.8 km runway, a pilot and staff quarters, a pilot training centre and more than one terminal..

As of 16 February 2026, a flying club was planned to be set-up at the airport.

=== Re-development ===
It is proposed to develop the following infrastructure at the Warangal airport:

1. Dismantling/Reconstruction, modification and extension of existing Runway 09/27, from 1860m x 45m to 2500m X 45m.

2. Construction of Apron for parking of 3 nos. of Code-C Aircraft in power-in pushback configuration along with link taxi track & associated GSE area.

3. Construction of Isolation Bay with link taxi track.

4. Construction of New Domestic Passenger Terminal Building with area of 6800 sqm. and peak hour capacity of 850 passengers (425 Arrival + 425 Departure)

5. Construction of ATC Tower cum Technical Block of ATC Category III +IMD Category-III.

6. Construction of Fire Station of Category-VI. 7. Construction of Electric Sub Station, STP and other ancillary facilities

== Airlines and destinations ==
There is no scheduled commercial air service at this time.

The Airports Authority of India has included Warangal airport in the list of under-served and unserved airports, suitable for the regional connectivity scheme.

== See also ==
- List of airports in Telangana
- Rajiv Gandhi International Airport
