= National Industrial Security Academy =

Training establishment in India

Location
- Hakimpet, Medchal–Malkajgiri District, Telangana; India
- Coordinates: 17°32′29″N 78°31′59″E

Information
- Type: Industrial security academy
- Established: 8 December 1990
- Director: D. P. Parihar IPS
- Campus size: 245 acres (99 ha)
- Campus type: Suburban
- Affiliation: Central Industrial Security Force
- Website: Official website

The National Industrial Security Academy (commonly abbreviated as NISA) is the premier training institution of Central Industrial Security Force (CISF) for training in industrial security and disaster management. The Academy is spread over 245-acre (99 ha) of land and is located in Hakimpet on the Rajiv Gandhi State Highway, Medchal–Malkajgiri District, of Hyderabad, Telangana.

Established in 1990 in its present form, NISA imparts basic induction training and other in-service courses for officers of CISF and specialized courses for Group- A officers, executives of PSUs' and foreign police officers. The mission of the Academy is to develop professionals imbibed with the highest standards of physical and mental fitness, in-depth knowledge and skills pertaining to industrial and critical infrastructure security, aviation security, disaster management and a positive attitude characterized by discipline, loyalty, integrity, courage and responsiveness. NISA is headed by an Inspector General-rank officer, designated as the director; this post is currently held by D. P. Parihar IPS. NISA is the only Central Training Institute (CTI) academy in the entire CAPFs has been recognised as the centre of excellence in industrial security management by the Government of India in 2016.

== History ==
Central Industrial Security Force came into being in the year 1969. Within a short span, this elite Armed Force of the Union, which was raised out of necessity to protect Public Sector Undertakings, has established itself as the largest industrial security Force in the Indian sub-continent. The CISF Training College, initially established at Partapur, Meerut District, Uttar Pradesh in 1969, was shifted to Shivrampalli, Hyderabad in 1971. In 1987, the College was moved into the present premises at Hakimpet, and was upgraded into an Academy on 8 December 1990. A new chapter was added to the history of the Academy when Fire Service Training Institute (FSTI) was shifted from Deoli (Rajasthan) to this Academy premises in 1999.

== Location & Infrastructure ==
The distance from the Academy to the Rajiv Gandhi International Airport (Shamshabad) is approximately 78 kms. (via ORR) and to Secunderabad Railway Station is approximately 17 kms. Important landmark near NISA is Air Force Station Hakimpet. The Academy conducts basic induction training of directly - recruited Assistant Commandants and Sub - Inspectors and functions as an institution to cultivate professionalism & expertise in Industrial Security Management among CISF personnel.

The Martyr's Memorial of CISF is located at the NISA campus. This memorial honours the personnel who have lost their lives serving for the nation since 1969.

Following infrastructure facilities are available in the academy

Accommodation facilities

- Ananda – Senior Executive Lounge with 08 Suites for Flag Officers
- Atulyaa, Officers' Mess – 72 + 56 rooms (12 VIP Suites)
- Senior Officers' Mess, FSTI
- Abhaya, Adarsha and Ajaya, Single Living Accommodation for SOs Trainees (3 Hostels) – 375 Rooms
- Barracks Capacity – 600 men
- Family Quarter (For Faculty and Staff)

Sports facilities

- Tennis Court
- Badminton Court
- Basketball Course
- Volleyball Court
- Stadium

Other facilities

- Multi-Purpose Hall: used for different purposes viz conferences, classes, yoga, sainik sammelans, debates and sports activities.
- Convention Center: used for seminars, webinars, conferences, classes, and other cultural activities.
- Computer Lab
- Swimming Pool
- Gym
- Hospital
- Library
- SBI Branch, ATM & ICICI ATM
- Post Office

== Courses conducted ==
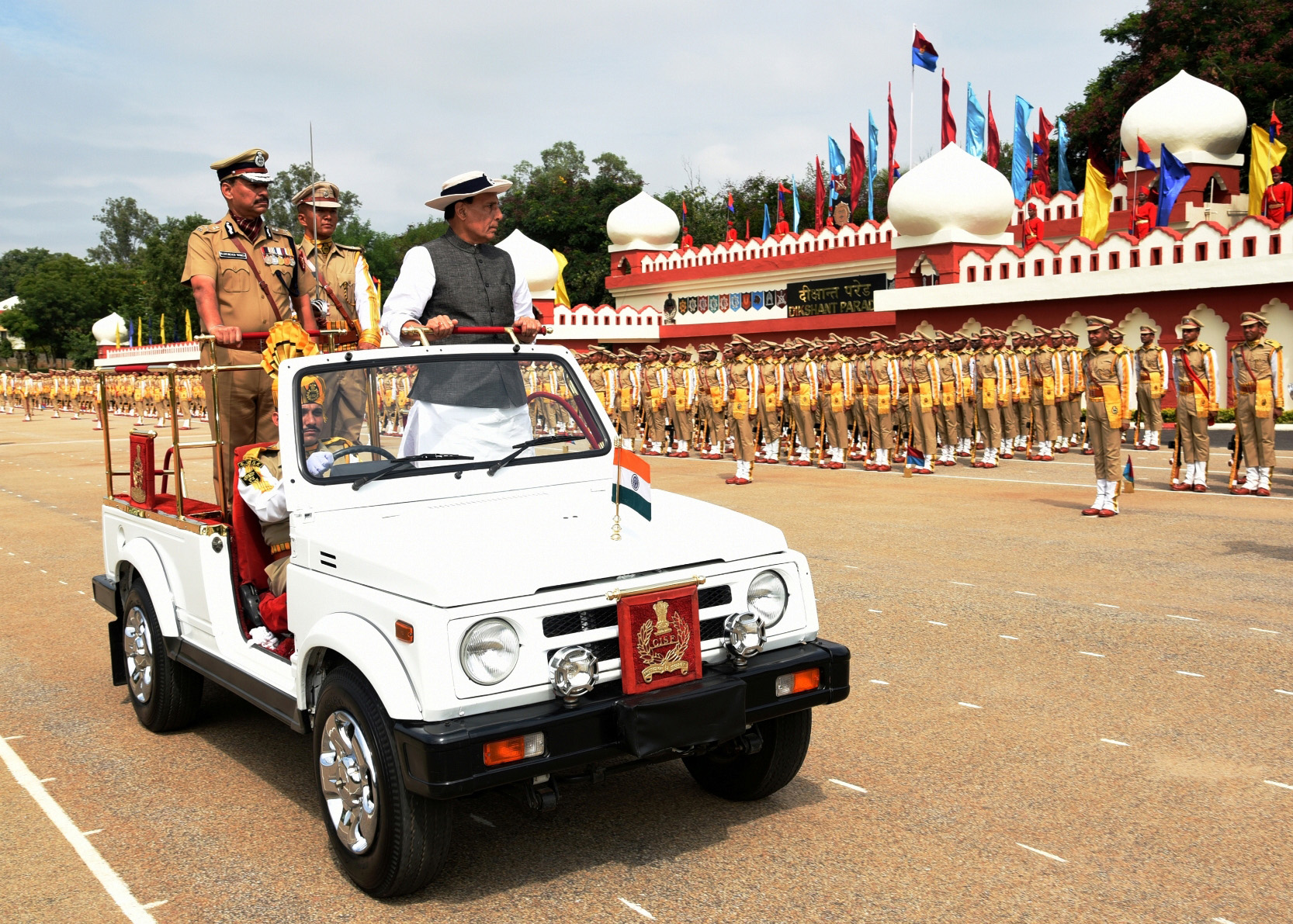
Shri Rajnath Singh inspecting the guard of honour at the Passing Out Parade of the 29th batch of Assistant Commandants and 41st Batch of Sub-Inspectors at NISA

The academy conducts different basic and promotion courses for gazetted and subordinate officers, basic courses for assistant commandants recruited through direct appointment and departmental entry, sub-inspectors executive and sub-inspectors fire through direct appointment, and promotion courses of all the gazetted ranks up to inspector general. Promotion courses of inspector executive to assistant commandant executive and inspectors, both ministerial and stenographer, to assistant commandant junior accounts officer, are also held at NISA. After the completion of training at NISA, assistant commandants and sub-inspectors are also awarded a postgraduate diploma in industrial security, law and management recognised by NALSAR University of Law.

Apart from the above, NISA is also conducting specialised outdoor courses like Sniper course, CRT course, KravMaga, Parkour Trainer of Trainees Course for all ranks.

== Training to other organisations ==
NISA also provides training to the personnel of different national and international security agencies and police organisations. Training include a three-week training course for Indian Revenue Service probationers, a disaster management course, a critical incident management course, a capsule course on installation security intrusion detection system and improvised explosive devices, and sector specific industrial security courses. 40 policemen, specialised in anti-fedayeen operations, of Special Operations Group of Jammu and Kashmir Police were trained at NISA. The academy conducted an industrial security course for 30 Sri Lanka Police officers of ranks chief inspector, inspector and sub-inspector. The training programme was sponsored and entirely funded by the Government of India, costing over 5 million Sri Lankan rupees.

== Innovation & Training ==
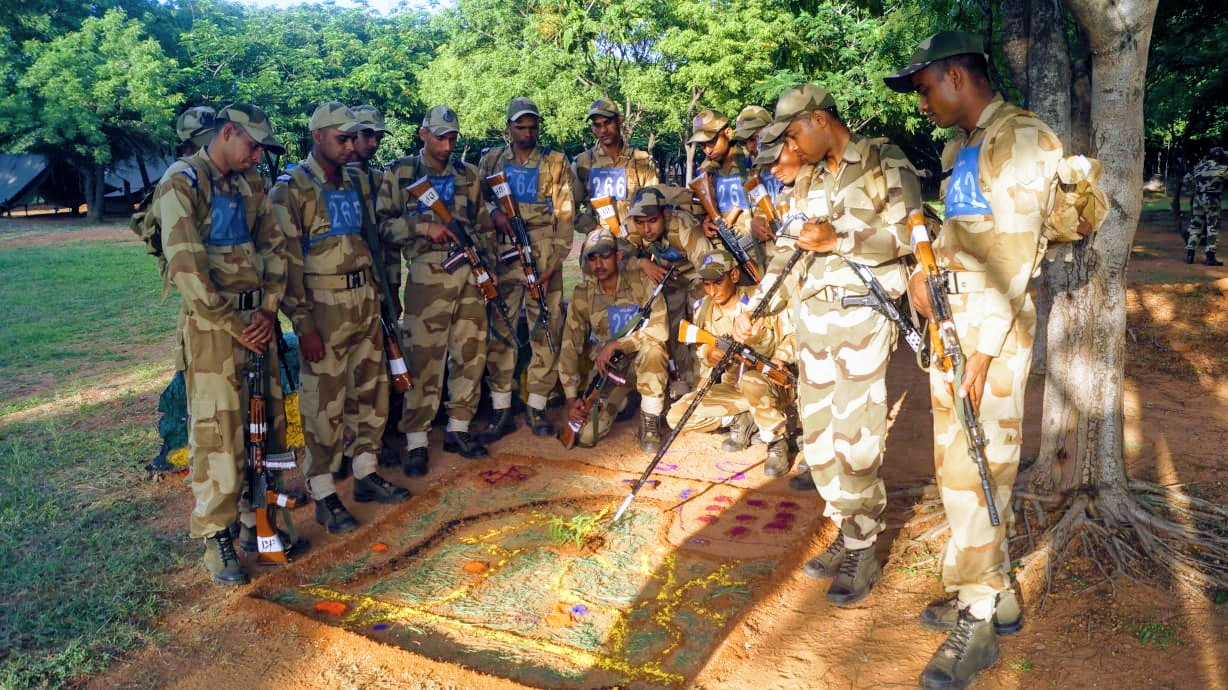
Sub-inspector under trainees during training at NISA

The Academy is headed by an Inspector General-rank officer who also serves in the capacity of director of NISA. Shri K. Sunil Emmanuel, IPS, an Indian Police Service officer of 2003 batch from Uttar Pradesh-cadre, currently holds the position since his deputation to the Centre. He assumed charge as director in December 2022

On 28 May 2016 at New Delhi, during the National Symposium on Excellence in Training (NSET), NISA received a national award for 'excellence in training' in the category of trainer and faculty development. The Symposium is organised by the Department of Personnel and Training, and NISA was the sole awardee in 2016.

NISA has been awarded Union Home Minister’s Trophy for Best Training Institute for GOs on two occasions – 2017-18 and again in 2020-21. NISA has also been awarded the ‘Finest India Skills & Talent (F.I.S.T) 2017 Award’ for best Security Training Institution across the country by Fire and Safety Association of India.

== Securitypedia ==
Securitypedia is an online encyclopedia of CISF developed and maintained by the NISA. Currently, it is available only to CISF personnel through www.securitypedia.in. However, the platform is envisioned to be made available to other Central Armed Police Forces in the future. It contains articles related to security technologies, CISF units, study material for both Sector specific & basic induction courses, and articles on other national and international law enforcement agencies. The encyclopedia is based on Wikipedia in a way that it allows its readers to edit articles after providing reliable and verifiable references but new articles can only be published after the scrutiny of the NISA and CISF officers.

== 54th CISF Day Parade at NISA ==
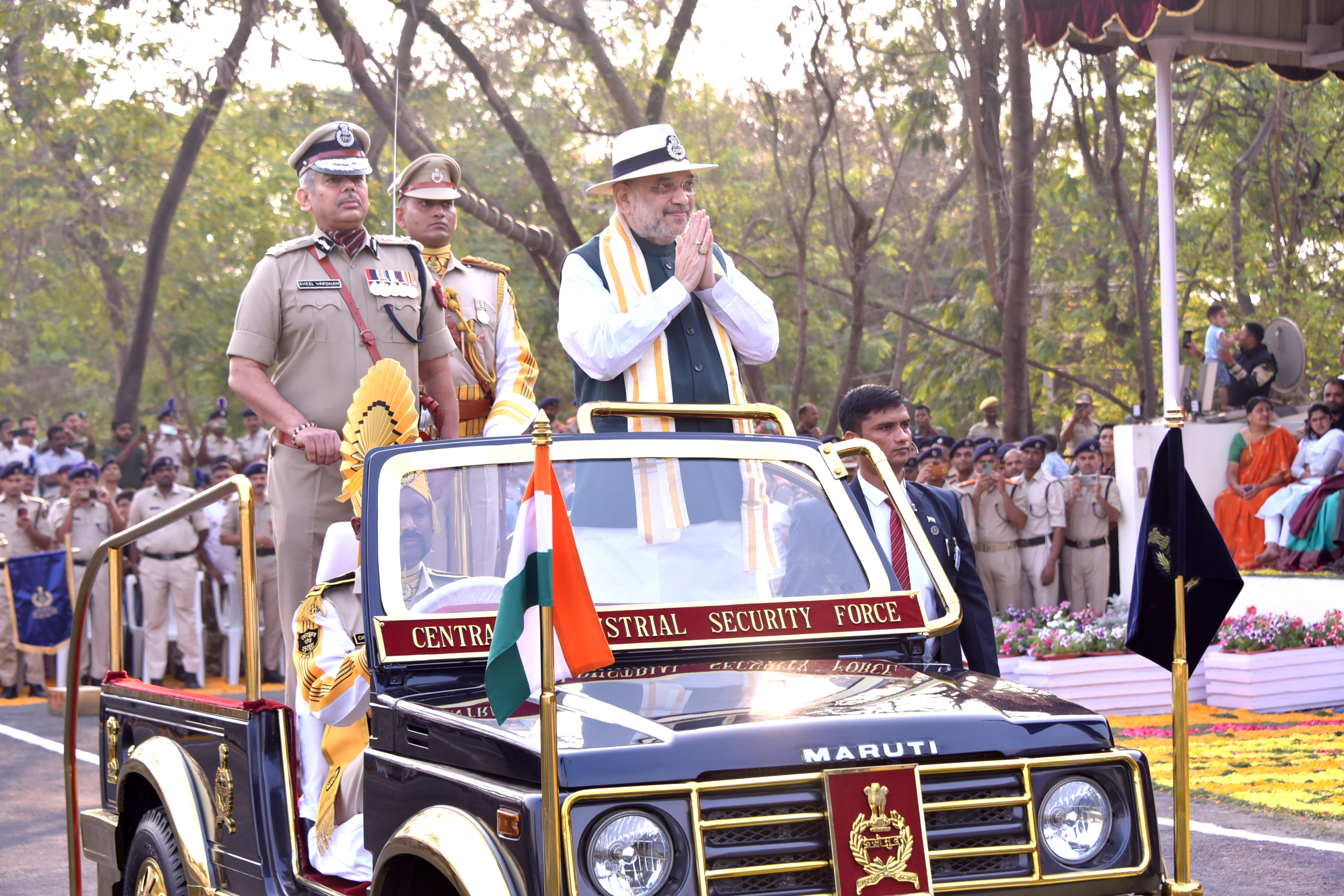
Shri Amit Shah Union Home Minister inspecting the CISF Day Parade on 12.03.2023 at NISA Hyderabad

Central Industrial Security Force (CISF) celebrated the 54th Raising Day parade at National Industrial Security Academy (NISA) in Hyderabad for the first time, out of Delhi National Capital Region (NCR). Union Home Minister Shri Amit Shah appreciated the tireless efforts put in by the CISF by providing extensive support and security across the country and lauded their commitment to the safety of the citizens. The Chief Guest also wished the CISF personnel on the raising day and saluted their unwavering commitment to the nation’s security. Shortly after the speech of the Chief Guest, Fire Service Training Institute (FSTI) and NISA staff demonstrated their proactive response during untoward incidents through simulations. The all-women contingent displayed the ancient martial art Kalarippayattu, a native art from Kerala, which was lauded by the attendees.
