= Fire Service Training Institute =

CISF institute

The Fire Service Training Institute is an institution of the Central Armed Police Force of India responsible for providing training in fire safety and firefighting.

== History ==
The Fire Service Training Institute was established on 2 February 1987 at Deoli, Rajasthan with a sanctioned strength of 84 personnel. It was shifted to its present campus within the premises of the National Industrial Security Academy at Hakimpet, Medchal–Malkajgiri District, on the outskirts of Hyderabad, Telangana, in 1999. A separate fire wing cadre within the CISF was created when the Government of India approved recruitment rules for various posts of this new cadre in January 1991 and it came into effect on 12 January 1991.

== Training ==
The FSTI conducts different basic and promotion courses for subordinate officers and the other ranks including head-constables and constables of fire cadre of the CISF. The institute also trains firefighting personnel from different organisations including National Fire Service College at Nagpur, Indian Coast Guard, Directorate General – Fire Services, Civil Defense and Home Guards sponsored subordinate officers, Rapid Action Force of Central Reserve Police Force, Chukha Power Project of Bhutan, Oil and Natural Gas Corporation unit of Assam among others. Many firefighters from foreign countries, including Mauritius, Kenya, and State of Palestine, have been trained at the FSTI.
