= Hakimpet =

- Village
- Location in Telangana, India Hakimpet (India)
- Coordinates: 17°33′N 78°31′E
- Country: India
- State: Telangana

Languages
  - Official: Telugu
- Time zone: UTC+5:30 (IST)
- Telephone code: 040
- Vehicle registration: TS 08
- Sex ratio: 1:1(approx) ♂/♀
- Website: telangana.gov.in

Hakimpet is a village in Medchal district near Hyderabad, Telangana, India. It falls under Shamirpet mandal.

== Location ==
Hakimpet is located near to Rajiv Rahadari Highway (Telangana State SH-1). It is located on the northern outskirts of Hyderabad. Hakimpet is 15 km away from Secunderabad Railway Station. It has an average elevation of 597 metres. Hakimpet village falls under the newly created Thumkunta Municipality, previously it was under Devaryamjal Gram Panchayat. It is home to hakimpet Lake. It is a fast developing village in Shamirpet Mandal, Medchal district.

Hakimpet is surrounded by Medchal Mandal towards west, Keesara Mandal towards East, Quthbullapur Mandal towards west, Mulug Mandal towards North. The total area of Hakimpet is 1883 hectares. Alwal is the nearest town to Hakimpet. Alwal is 10 kilometers away from Hakimpet. Road connectivity is there from Alwal to Hakimpet. Bolarum Railway Station is the nearest railway station to Hakimpet.

It falls under Medchal Assembly constituency and Malkajgiri Parliamentary Constituency. The Hakimpet PIN code is 500078 and the postal head office is Nisa Hakimpet.

== Establishments ==
Hakimpet has an Indian Air Force base known as Hakimpet Air Force Station (Hakimpet AFS) and the Indian Army base is also located here. It also has the Central Industrial Security Force (CISF), National Industrial Security Academy (NISA) and RAF, CRPF Campus (CRPF Group Centre Ranga Reddy). Near to the CRPF Campus, the CRPF Public School is located. TSRTC Depot, both the Greater Hyderabad and Hyderabad Transport Academy, D'Marc Cricket Academy (DMRC) Hakimpet Cricket Ground and Telangana Sports School are located here.

Hakimpet is also home to the Telangana State Sports School, rated the best sports school in India at the 2017 at SFA Hyderabad Championship.
