= Hakimpet Air Force Station =

Hakimpet Air Force Station Secunderabad Cantonment
- IATA: none; ICAO: VOHK

Summary
- Airport type: Military (Indian Air Force)
- Operator: Training Command (India)
- Serves: Hyderabad, India
- Location: Hakimpet, Secunderabad Cantonment, Telangana
- Elevation AMSL: 2,020 ft / 616 m
- Coordinates: 17.552941°N 78.520222°E
- Interactive map of Hakimpet Air Force Station Secunderabad Cantonment

Runways
Direction	Length		Surface
Direction	ft	m	Surface
09/27	7,384	2,250	Concrete / asphalt

Hakimpet Air Force Station (Hakimpet AFS) is an Indian Air Force (IAF) base under the Training Command. It is located 25 kilometres north of Hyderabad Central Nampally Railway Station, and 18 km north of Secunderabad Railway Junction in the state of Telangana. It houses the Fighter Training Wing, the Helicopter Training School, No. 43 Equipment Depot and ancillary units. There is one runway, aligned east–west (09–27), of 7,384 feet (2,251 m) length x 150 feet (46 m) width.

== History ==
Hakimpet AFS was used during the Second World War as a transit airfield by the Royal Air Force. The Nizam of Hyderabad never acceded power following Indian independence until after Operation Polo. Hakimpet AFS fell into disuse. The Conversion and Training Unit (CTU) was established in 1951 to provide Fighter Conversion Training to newly commissioned pilots in the IAF. CTU was renamed as the Jet Training Wing (JTW) in 1958 after the phase out of prop aircraft. In June 1964 it was merged with No. 2 JTW (based in Bidar) and was renamed as Fighter Training Wing. Hakimpet AFS was elevated to 'Air Force Station' status in December 1984. The Station Museum was established in 2001.

== See also ==
- Begumpet Airport
