= Boggula Dastagiri =

Indian politician

Member of Legislative Assembly Andhra Pradesh
- Incumbent
- Assumed office 2024
- Preceded by: Jaradoddi Sudhakar
- Constituency: Kodumur

Personal details
- Party: Telugu Desam Party

Boggula Dastagiri (born 1985) is an Indian politician from Andhra Pradesh. He is an MLA from Kodumur Assembly constituency which is reserved for SC community in Kurnool district. He represents Telugu Desam Party. He won the 2024 Andhra Pradesh Legislative Assembly election where TDP had an alliance with BJP and Jana Sena Party.

== Early life and education ==
Dastagiri is from Kodumur, Kurnool district. His father's name is Boggula Ramudu. He completed his L.L.M. in 2018 at Sri Krishna Devaraya University, Anantapuram.

== Political career ==
Dastagiri won the 2024 Andhra Pradesh Legislative Assembly election from Kodumur Assembly constituency representing Telugu Desam Party. He polled 1,01,703 votes and defeated Audimulapu Sateesh of YSR Congress Party by a margin of 21,583 votes.
