= List of rock formations in India =

The following is a partial list of rock formations in the India, by state:

== Andhra Pradesh ==
- Orvakal Rock Garden, Kurnool
- Natural Arch, Tirumala Hills

== Rajasthan ==
- Toad Rock, Mount Abu

Jaoda deposits in chitorgarh

== Karnataka ==
- Yana Rocks
- Sidlaphadi, Badami
- Peninsular Gneiss, Lalbagh, Bangalore
- Bugle Rock
- Hampi Boulders
- St. Mary's Islands of Columnar Basaltic Lava
- Rocks of Ramanagara: Ramdevarabetta, Savandurga, Revanasideshwara hill and Handigundi

== Hyderabad ==
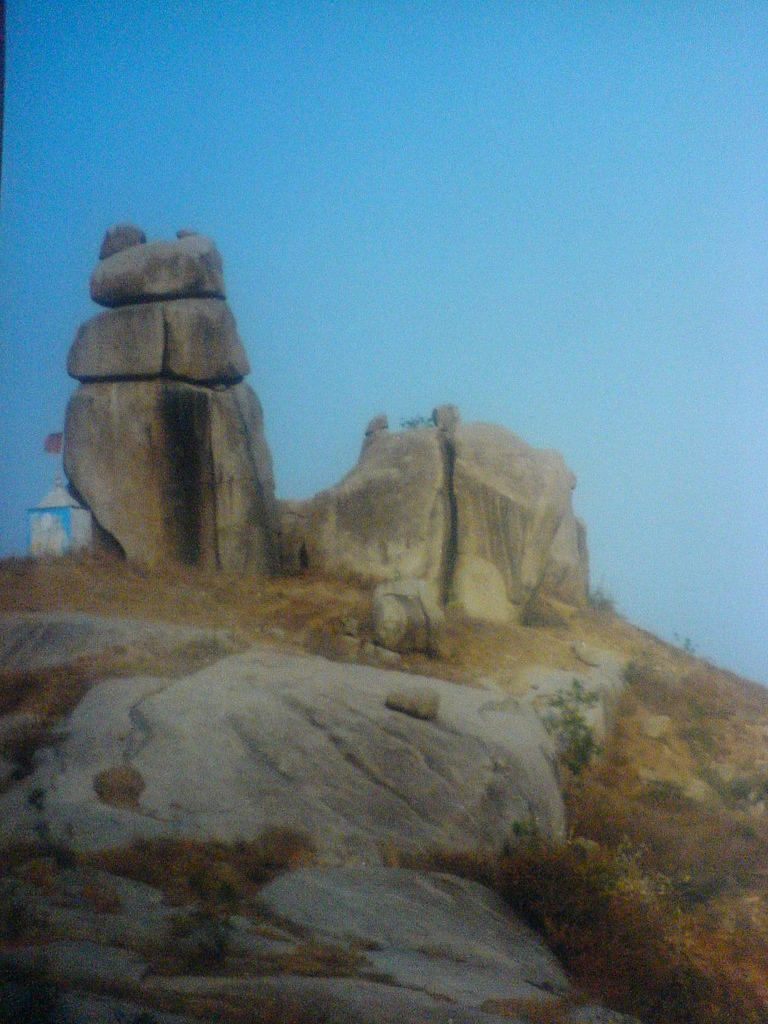
Sentinel Rock, near Moula Ali

- 1. “Bear’s Nose” inside Shilparamam, Madhapur
- 2. “Cliff Rock”, Jubilee Hills
- 3. Hillocks around Durgam Cheruvu Lake, Jubilee Hills
- 4. “Monster Rock” near Film Nagar, Jubilee Hills
- 5. “Obelisk”, Jubilee Hills
- 6. “Mushroom Rock” inside the University of Hyderabad Campus
- 7. Rock Park, on Old Bombay Road near Dargah Hussain Shah Wali
- 8. Sentinel Rock, near Moula-Ali
- 9. Rocks at Maula Ali's Dargah, Moula-Ali
- 10. “Toadstool” next to Blue Cross, Jubilee Hills

== Kerala ==
- Phantom Rock, Wayanad

== Madhya Pradesh ==
- Jabalpur Marble Rocks Madhya Pradesh, India
- Balancing Rock, Jabalpur

== Maharashtra ==
- Telbaila Rock formation, Lonavala
- Gilbert Hill, Mumbai
- Needle Hole Point or Elephant Point, Mahabaleshwar

== Meghalaya ==
- Kyllang Rock, Nongstoin
- Khoh Ramhah Rock, Cherrapunjee

== Mizoram ==
- Castle of Beino, Saphaw

== Tamil Nadu ==
- Pillar Rocks, Kodaikanal
- Krisna's Butterball, Mahabalipuram
