= Kodumur Assembly constituency =

Constituency of the Andhra Pradesh Legislative Assembly, India

Coordinates: 15.68°N 77.77°E

Kodumur
- Constituency No. 143 for the Andhra Pradesh Legislative Assembly
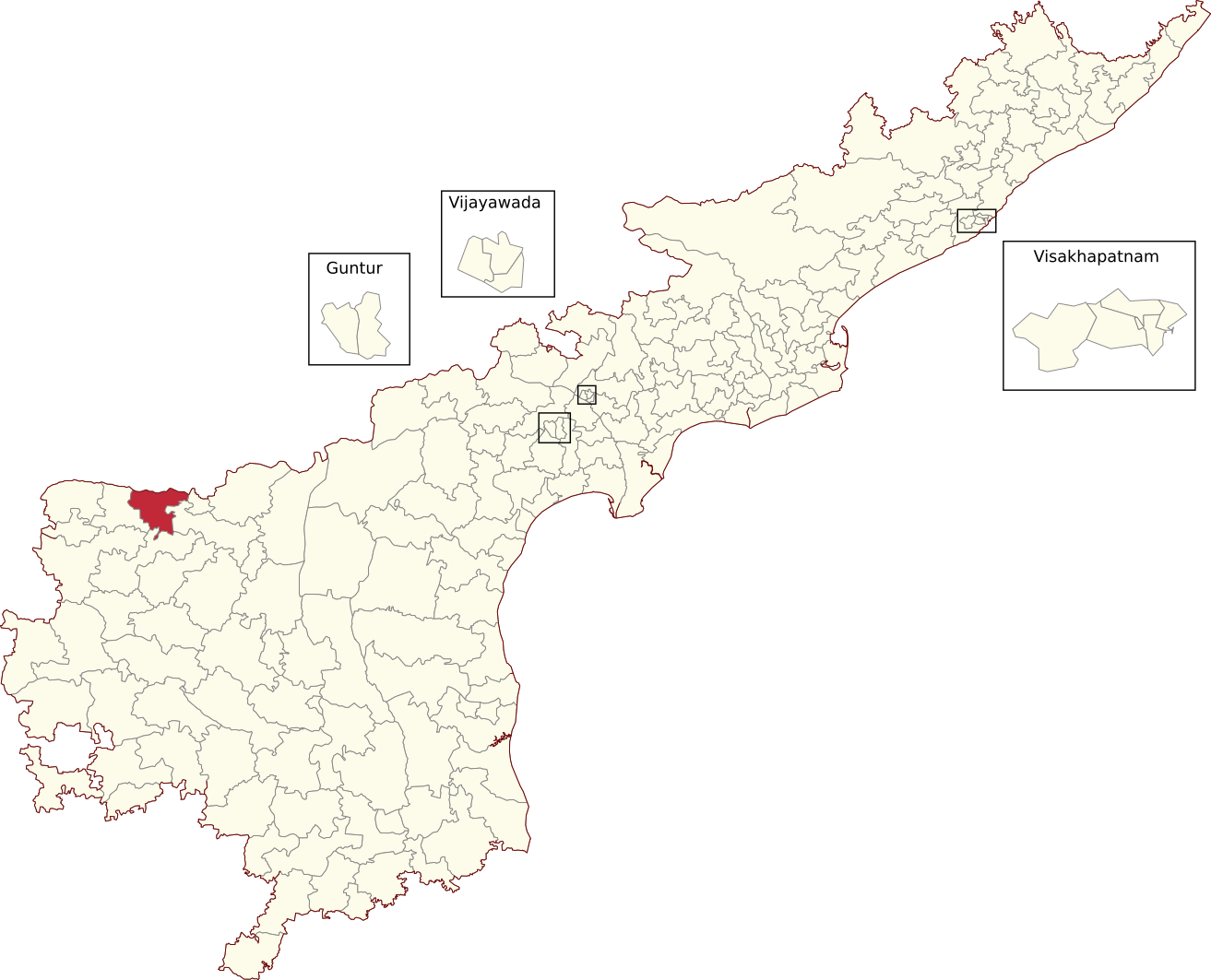
- Location of Kodumur Assembly constituency within Andhra Pradesh

Constituency details
- Country: India
- Region: South India
- State: Andhra Pradesh
- District: Kurnool
- Lok Sabha constituency: Kurnool
- Established: 1962
- Total electors: 216,090
- Reservation: SC

Member of Legislative Assembly
- 16th Andhra Pradesh Legislative Assembly
- Incumbent Boggula Dastagiri
- Party: TDP
- Alliance: NDA
- Elected year: 2024

Kondumur is a Scheduled Caste reserved constituency in Kurnool district of Andhra Pradesh that elects representatives to the Andhra Pradesh Legislative Assembly in India. It is one of the seven assembly segments of Kurnool Lok Sabha constituency.

Boggula Dastagiri is the current MLA of the constituency, having won the 2024 Andhra Pradesh Legislative Assembly election from Telugu Desam Party. As of 25 March 2019, there are a total of 216,090 electors in the constituency. The constituency was established in 1962, as per the Delimitation Orders (1962).

== Mandals ==
Kodumur assembly constituency consists of four mandals.

Mandals
Kurnool
C.Belagal
Kodumur
Gudur, Kurnool

== Members of the Legislative Assembly ==
Year	Member	Political party
1962	D. Sanjivayya	Indian National Congress
1967	P. R. Rao	Swatantra Party
1972	D. Muniswamy	Indian National Congress
1978	D. Muniswamy	Indian National Congress
1983	D. Muniswamy	Indian National Congress
1985	M. Sikhamani	Telugu Desam Party
1989	M. Madan Gopal	Indian National Congress
1994	M. Sikhamani	Indian National Congress
1999	M. Sikhamani	Indian National Congress
2004	M. Sikhamani	Indian National Congress
2009	Murali Krishna	Indian National Congress
2014	M. Mani Gandhi	YSR Congress Party
2019	Jaradoddi Sudhakar	YSR Congress Party
2024	Boggula Dastagiri	Telugu Desam Party

== Election results ==
=== 2004 ===
2004 Andhra Pradesh Legislative Assembly election: Kodumur
Party	Candidate	Votes	%	±%
INC	M Sikhamani	59,730	54.56	−2.93
TDP	Akepogu Prabhakar Rao	42,617	38.93	−2.30
Majority		17,113	14.51	
Turnout		109,482	67.71	+1.55
INC hold		Swing		

=== 2009 ===
2009 Andhra Pradesh Legislative Assembly election: Kodumur
Party	Candidate	Votes	%	±%
INC	Parigela Muralikrishna	47,844	38.19	−16.37
TDP	M. Mani Gandhi	42,519	33.94	−4.99
PRP	Bojugu Karunakara Raju	25,343	20.23	
Majority		5,325	4.25	
Turnout		125,276	72.99	+5.28
INC hold		Swing		

=== 2014 ===
2014 Andhra Pradesh Legislative Assembly election: Kodumur
Party	Candidate	Votes	%	±%
YSRCP	M. Mani Gandhi	84,206	55.20	
BJP	Madharapu Renukamma	31,822	20.90	
INC	Parigela Murali Krishna	21,118	13.87	
Majority		52,382	34.40	
Turnout		152,273	74.70	+1.71
YSRCP gain from INC		Swing		

=== 2019 ===
2019 Andhra Pradesh Legislative Assembly election: Kodumur
Party	Candidate	Votes	%	±%
YSRCP	Jaradoddi Sudhakar	100,000	55	
TDP	Burla Ramanjaneyulu	58,992	35.12	
Majority		36,045	21.18	
Turnout		170,214	78.77	+4.07
YSRCP hold		Swing		

=== 2024 ===
2024 Andhra Pradesh Legislative Assembly election: Kodumur
Party	Candidate	Votes	%	±%
TDP	Boggula Dastagiri	101,703	51.49	
YSRCP	Dr. Adimulapu Sathish	80,120	40.56	
INC	Parigela Murali Krishna	9,835	4.98	
NOTA	None Of The Above	2,169	1.1	
Majority		21,583	10.93	
Turnout		1,97,533		
TDP gain from YSRCP		Swing		

== See also ==
- List of constituencies of Andhra Pradesh Legislative Assembly
