= Molagavalli =

- Interactive map of Molagavalli
- Location in Andhra Pradesh, India
- Coordinates: 15.3567°N 77.3301°E
- Country: India
- State: Andhra Pradesh
- District: Kurnool
- Mandal: Alur
- Elevation: 508 m (1,667 ft)

Languages
  - Official: Telugu
- Time zone: UTC+5:30 (IST)

Molagavalli is a village in Kurnool district of the Indian state of Andhra Pradesh. It is located in Alur mandal of Pattikonda revenue division.

== Geography ==
Molagavalli is located at 15.3559°N 77.3296°E and at an altitude of 508 m (1,667 ft).
