= M. Mani Gandhi =

Indian politician

M. Mani Gandhi (born 1965) is an Indian politician from Andhra Pradesh. He was a former member of the Andhra Pradesh Legislative Assembly from Kodumur Assembly constituency which is reserved for the Scheduled Caste comminity in Kurnool district representing the YSR Congress Party.

== Early life ==
Gandhi is from Kodumur, Kurnool district, Andhra Pradesh. He is the son of the late M. Sikhamani, a former three time Congress MLA from Kodumur in 2004. He completed his BA in 1989 at S.T.B.C. College, Kurnool, which is affiliated with S.V. University. He declared assets worth Rs.9 lakhs in 2009 and Rs.21 lakhs in 2014 in his affidavits to the Election Commission of India.

== Career ==
Gandhi won from Kodumur Assembly constituency in the 2014 Andhra Pradesh Legislative Assembly election representing the YSR Congress. He polled 84,206 votes and defeated his nearest rival, Madharapu Renuka of the Bharatiya Janata Party, by a margin of 52,384 votes. He shifted to the Telugu Desam Party in 2016 but returned to YSRCP in 2019. He made his electoral debut in the 2019 Andhra Pradesh Legislative Assembly election on Telugu Desam Party ticket but lost to Parigela Muralikrishna of the Indian National Congress, by a margin of 5,325 votes.
