= Pattikonda =

- Town
- Location in Andhra Pradesh, India
- Coordinates: 15.4000°N 77.5167°E
- Country: India
- State: Andhra Pradesh
- District: Kurnool
- Mandal: Pattikonda mandal
- Elevation: 466 m (1,529 ft)

Population
  - Total: 29,342

Languages
  - Official: Telugu
- Time zone: UTC+5:30 (IST)
- Postal code: 518380
- Vehicle registration: AP

Pattikonda is a town in Pattikonda mandal of Kurnool district in Andhra Pradesh, India. It is under the administration of Pattikonda revenue division. It is located 80 km away from Kurnool, 35 km from Adoni town and 35 km from Guntakal Town.
