= Pedda Harivanam =

Pedda harivanam NDR dodda Harivana
- village
- Nickname: Pedda Harivanam
- Interactive map of Pedda harivanam
- Location in Andhra Pradesh, India
- Coordinates: 15°37′58″N 77°6′13″E
- Country: India
- State: Andhra Pradesh
- District: Kurnool
- Mandal: Adoni
- Established: 1500 year old history

Government
  - Type: Gram Panchayat
  - Body: panchayat
  - Rank: 1

Population
  - Total: 9,256
  - Rank: 2

Languages
  - Official: Telugu, Kannada, Urdu
- Time zone: UTC+5:30 (IST)
- Postal code: 518308
- Vehicle registration: AP 21

Pedda Harivanam is a village panchayath located in the Kurnool district of Andhra Pradesh state, India. The latitude 15.6207125 and longitude 77.0909809 are the geocoordinate of the Pedda Harivanam.
