= Amadaguntla =

- Revenue Village
- Interactive map of Amadaguntla
- Location in Andhra Pradesh, India
- Coordinates: 15.699400°N 77.868884°E
- Country: India
- State: Andhra Pradesh
- District: Kurnool

Government
  - Type: Panchayati raj
  - President: Varalakshmi Valisakkagari

Population (2011)
  - Total: 2,953

Languages
  - Official: Telugu
- Time zone: UTC+5:30 (IST)

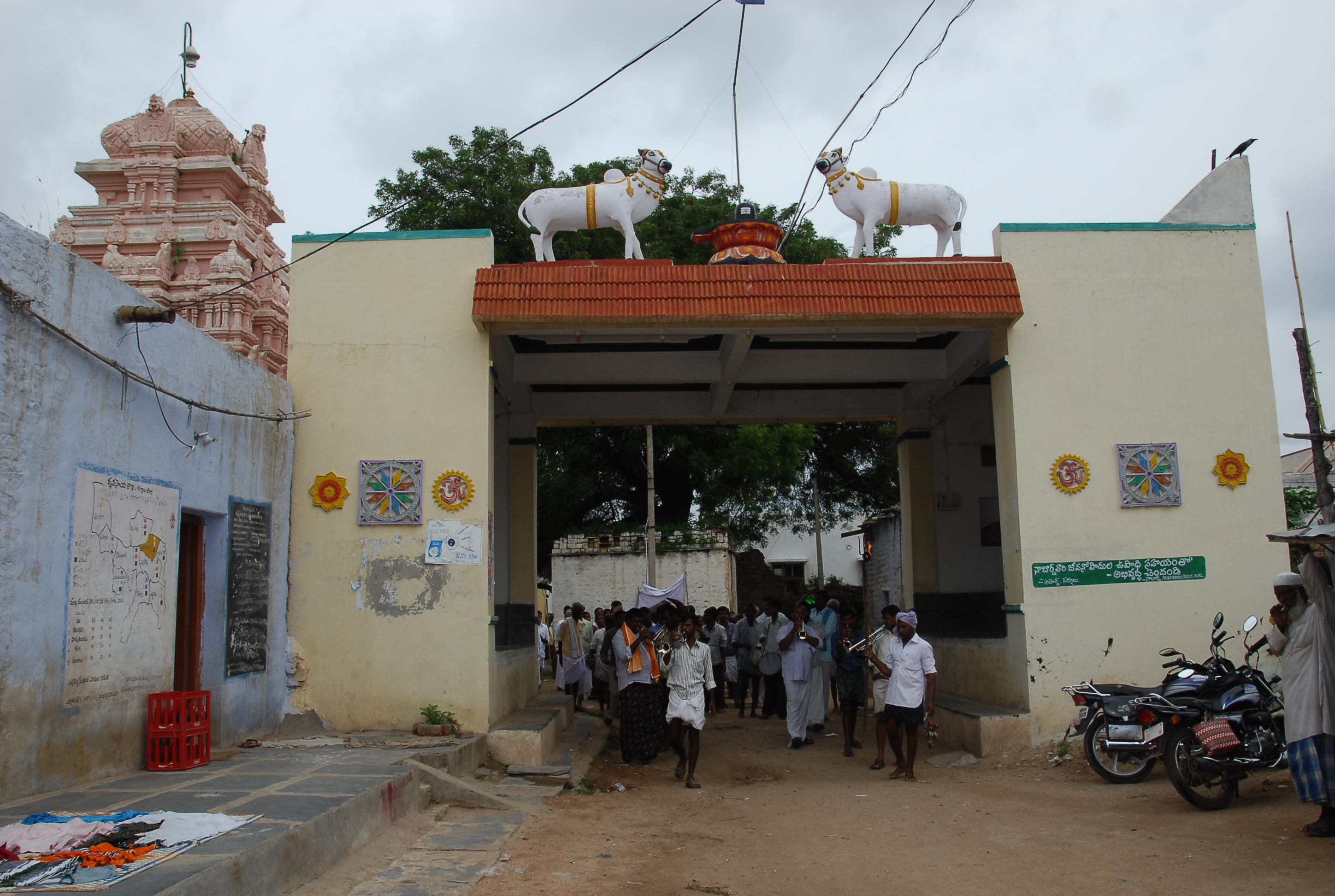
Amadaguntla entrance in 2011

Amadaguntla is a village in Kodumur mandal in Kurnool District in Andhra Pradesh.
