= Kurnool Urban mandal =

- Mandal
- Interactive map of Kurnool Urban mandal
- Location in Andhra Pradesh, India
- Coordinates: 15.83°N 78.05°E
- Country: India
- State: Andhra Pradesh
- District: Kurnool
- Headquarters: Kurnool

Population (2011)
  - Total: 406,797

Languages
  - Official: Telugu
- Time zone: UTC+5:30 (IST)

Kurnool Urban mandal is one of the 27 mandals in Kurnool district of the Indian state of Andhra Pradesh. It is administered under Kurnool revenue division and its headquarters are located at Kurnool. The mandal is situated on the banks of Krishna River and is bounded by Kurnool rural mandal,C.Belagal, Gudur, Kallur, Orvakal, Midthur and Nandikotkur mandals. As of the 2011 census, it has 406,797 residents.

== Towns and villages ==
As of 2011 census, the mandal has 16 settlements, that includes:

1. Chejerla
2. Cheruvu Kommupalem
3. Devarampadu
4. Gudimellapadu
5. Karavadi
6. Koppolu (Rural)
7. Kothamamidipalem (Rural)
8. Mangaladripuram
9. Mukthinutalapadu (Rural)
10. Narasapuram
11. Pelluru (Rural)
12. Sarvereddypalem
13. Throvagunta
14. Ulichi
15. Vengamukkapalem
16. Yerajerla

== See also ==
- List of mandals in Andhra Pradesh
