= Ternekal =

- Village
- Interactive map of Ternekal
- Location in Andhra Pradesh, India
- Coordinates: 15°38′21″N 77°31′49″E
- Country: India
- State: Andhra Pradesh
- District: Kurnool
- Mandal: Devanakonda

Languages
  - Official: Telugu
- Time zone: UTC+5:30 (IST)

Ternekal is a village in Kurnool district of the Indian state of Andhra Pradesh. It is located in Devanakonda mandal.
