= Maddikera Agraharam =

Coordinates: 15°16′N 77°26′E

Maddikera Agraharam Agaraharam
- village
- Interactive map of Maddikera Agraharam
- Country: India
- State: Andhra Pradesh
- District: Kurnool

Population
  - Total: 8,500

Languages
  - Official: Telugu
- Time zone: UTC+5:30 (IST)
- PIN: 518385
- Telephone code: 08520

Maddikera Agraharam is a small village in Maddikera East mandal, Kurnool District, Andhra Pradesh State in India.
