= Nandavaram, Kurnool district =

Coordinates: 15°51′08″N 77°29′05″E

Nandavaram is a village and headquarters of Nandavaram mandal in Kurnool district, Andhra Pradesh, India.
