= Adoni revenue division =

Coordinates: 15.63222°N 77.27284°E

- revenue division in kurnool district
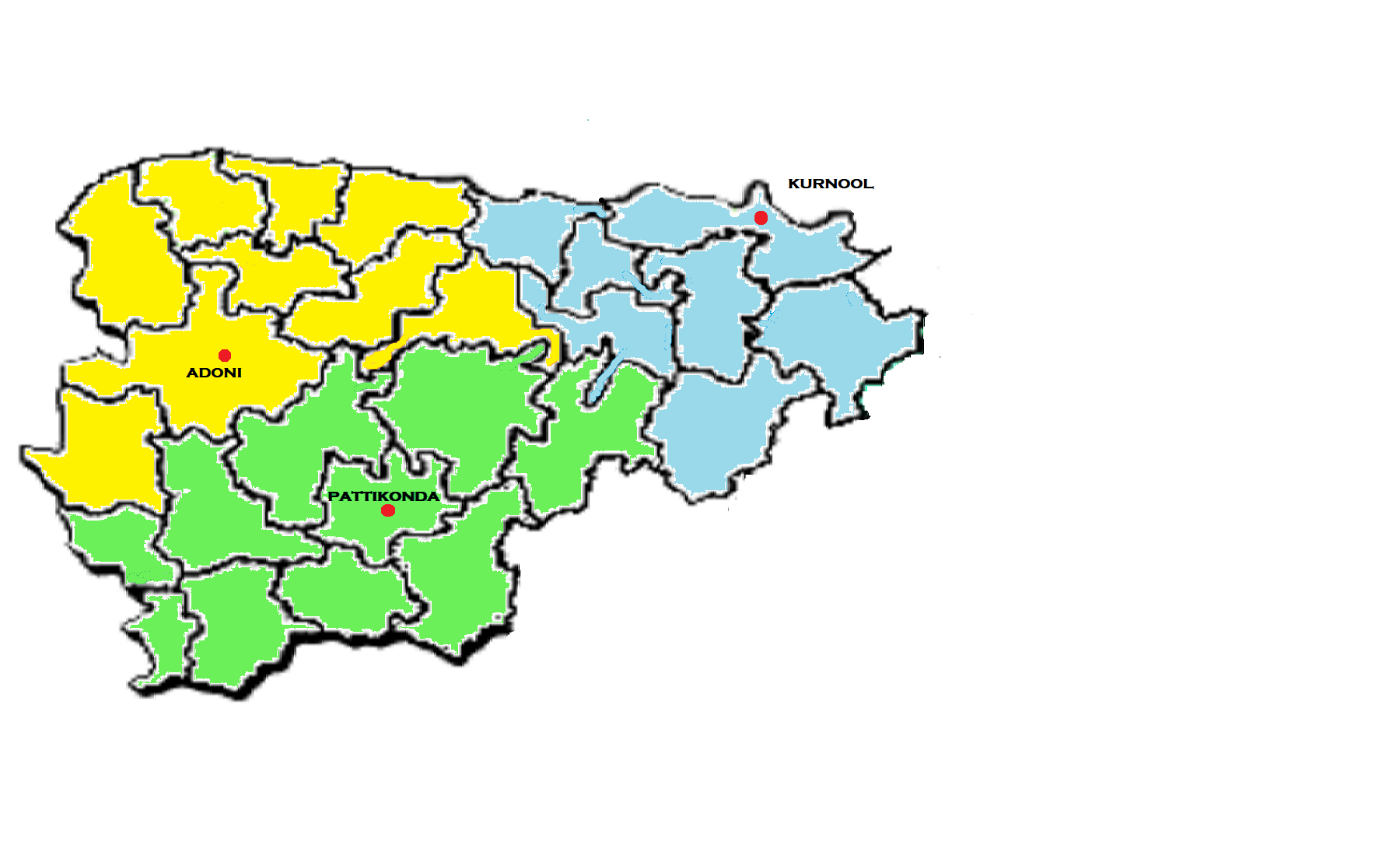
- Adoni revenue division in kurnool district
- Country: India
- State: Andhra Pradesh
- District: Kurnool
- Headquarters: Adoni
- Time zone: UTC+05:30 (IST)

Adoni revenue division (or Adoni division) is an administrative division in the Kurnool district of the Indian state of Andhra Pradesh. It is one of the 3 revenue divisions in the district with 10 mandals under its administration. The divisional headquarters is located at Adoni.

== History ==
Adoni revenue division is divided into two parts in April 2022, as new revenue division is formed with Pattikonda as HQ.

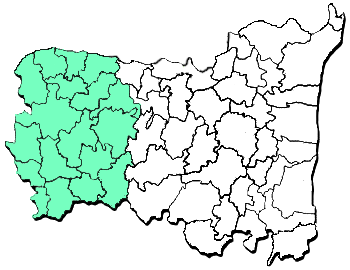

Adoni revenue division in old kurnool district

== Administration ==
The 10 mandals administered under Adoni revenue division are:

No.	Mandals
1	Adoni Urban mandal
2	Adoni Rural mandal
3	Mantralayam mandal
4	Pedda Kadubur mandal
5	Kosigi mandal
6	Kowthalam mandal
7	Holagunda mandal
8	Yemmiganur mandal
9	Nandavaram mandal
10	Gonegandla mandal

== See also ==
- List of revenue divisions in Andhra Pradesh
