= Adoni Rural mandal =

Mandal in Kurnool district, Andhra Pradesh, India

Adoni-2 mandal
- Mandal
- Interactive map of Adoni-2 mandal
- Location in Andhra Pradesh, India
- Coordinates: 15°37′28″N 77°16′23″E
- Country: India
- State: Andhra Pradesh
- District: Kurnool
- Headquarters: Adoni
- Time zone: UTC+05:30 (IST)

Adoni-2 mandal is one of the mandals in Kurnool district in the Indian state of Andhra Pradesh. It is a part of Adoni revenue division.

== History ==
The mandal carved out from Adoni mandal which was made part of the Kurnool district on 31 December 2025.

== Villages in the Mandal ==
=== Revenue villages ===
The Revenue Villages of This mandal are :

1. Pedda Harivanam
2. Santekudluru
3. Yadavalle
4. Baladur
5. Chinna Gonehal
6. Chinna Harivanam
7. Madire
8. Kadithota
9. Hanavalu
10. G. Hosalli
11. Basapuram
12. V. Kondapuram
13. Naganathanahalli
14. Naranapuram
15. Chagi
16. Dhanapuram
17. Ganekal
18. Ballekallu
19. Pandavagallu
20. Kuppagallu
21. Jalibenchi
22. Pedda Thumbalam
