= Shahi Jamia Mosque =

Mosque in Adoni, Andhra Pradesh, India

Shahi Jamia Masjid
- Location within Andhra Pradesh

Religion
- Affiliation: Islam
- District: Kurnool
- Province: Andhra Pradesh

Location
- Country: India
- Interactive map of Shahi Jamia Masjid
- Territory: Adoni
- Coordinates: 15.625556°N 77.272222°E

Architecture
- Architect: Malli Sandal
- Type: Mosque
- Style: Islamic
- Funded by: Siddi Masood Khan
- Completed: 1662; 364 years ago
- Construction cost: 2,000,000 dinars + ₹77,000

Specifications
- Capacity: 1,000
- Dome: 2
- Site area: 10 acres (4.0 ha)
- Materials: Granite

The Shahi Jamia Mosque is a mosque in Adoni, India. The masjid is a relic of architectural and cultural heritage. People from all sections of society and religions are allowed to visit and take pictures of this historical premise. It lies in the heart of the town, near the market, a very busy place within the town.

== Construction and architecture ==
The mosque was built by Masud Khan, a governor serving under Bijapur Sultan Sikandar Adil Shah. Masud Khan had retired at Adoni in the year 1683. The land was purchased from Mohammed Shahnaz Namia by Masood Khan by giving ₹77,000 and spent the total amount of 2,000,000 dinars to complete the construction of the masjid. The architects for this masjid were Iranian engineers headed by Malli Sandal. The specialty of this masjid is that the area of this masjid is as same as of the Kaaba in Mecca, Saudi Arabia.

In the front side of the masjid, 15 black slabs can be found, in which the things about the masjid are written in Arabic and Persian languages along with some Ayats of the Quran. Hadith's can also be found. The chains in the left and right minarets of the masjid gives more beauty.

== Surroundings ==
However the masjid is surrounded by the shops which comes under Masjid's committee. Rather than this the areas around Masjid are

- Front side - Market, P.N Road
- Backside - Masoodia Arabic High School, Masid Pura, Khazi Pura
- Right side - Flower Bazar
- Left side - Shroff Bazar

A thriving market exists around the Masjid.

== Educational institution ==
The Masjid committee also operates a high school within the masjid called Masoodia Arabic High School. It is named for Siddi Masood Khan.

== See also ==
- Islamic architecture
- Islamic art
- Sahn
- Timeline of Islamic history
