= Hebbatam =

- Revenue Village
- Interactive map of Hebbatam
- Location in Andhra Pradesh, India Hebbatam (India)
- Coordinates: 15.561215°N 77.154268°E
- Country: India
- State: Andhra Pradesh
- District: Kurnool

Population (2011)
  - Total: 3,988

Languages
  - Official: Telugu
- Time zone: UTC+5:30 (IST)
- PIN: 518308

Hebbatam is a village in Alur Taluq, Kurnool district, Andhra Pradesh, India. The village constitutes around 2800 resident voters. Members of many castes are found in the village. It has one canal and three ponds, one of which was damaged by heavy rain in 2005.
