= Natural Arch, Tirumala hills =

National Geo-heritage Monument in Andhra Pradesh, India

Natural Arch
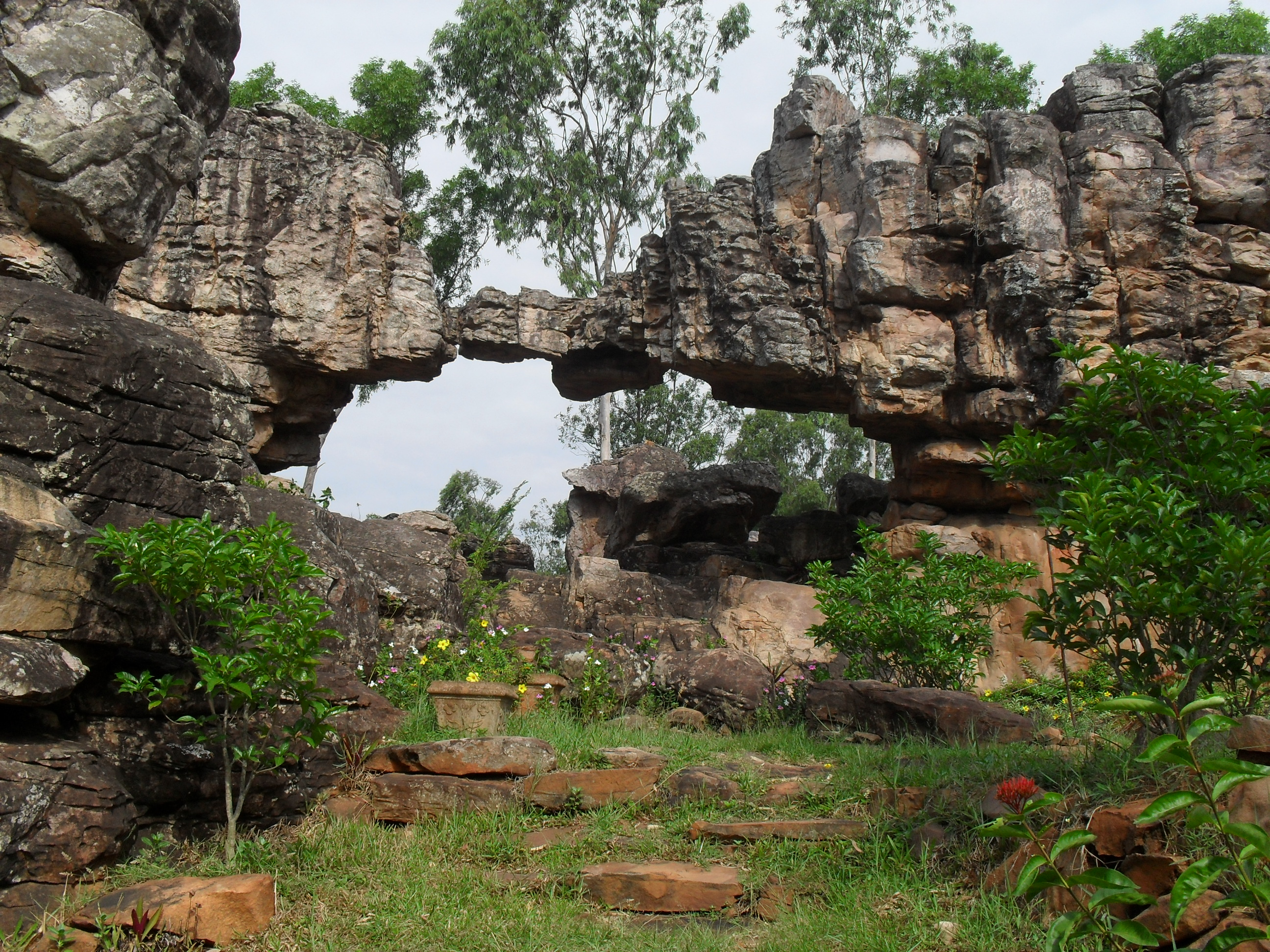

- Location within India
- Location: Tirumala, Andhra Pradesh, India
- Nearest city: Tirupati
- Coordinates: 13°40′54″N 79°20′46″E
- Width: 26.2 ft (8.0 m)
- Elevation: 9.8 ft (3.0 m)
- Designation: National Geological Monument; Tentative List, World Heritage Sites
- Administrator: Geological Survey of India; Tirumala Tirupati Devasthanams

The natural arch in Tirumala, is located on the Sapthagiri mountains in the Seshachalam Hills of the Eastern Ghats. The 3 m (9.8 ft) tall and 8 m (26 ft) wide rock arch was formed by consistent erosion of the underlying quartzite rock, and is dated to the Middle to Upper Proterozoic era (1600 to 570 Mya). It was listed as a National Geological Monument in 1981 and is part of the Tentative List of World Heritage Sites.

== Geography ==
The natural arch is located in Tirumala atop the Venkatadri hill in the Sapthagiri range in the Seshachalam Hills of the Eastern Ghats. Located about 860 m (2,820 ft) above sea level in the Tirupati district of Andhra Pradesh, it is near Chakra Theertham, about 1 km (0.62 mi) from the Venkateswara Temple in Tirumala.

The arch was declared as a National Geological Monument in 1981 and the 50 m × 10 m (164 ft × 33 ft) site around the arch is declared as a National Geo-heritage Site by the Geological Survey of India. It is also listed in the Tentative List of the World Heritage Sites. The site is maintained by the Tirumala Tirupati Devasthanams, and is fenced.

== Description and geology ==
The arch is 8 m (26 ft) tall and 3 m (9.8 ft) wide. The arch consists of two vertical columns connected by a horizontal rocky outcrop. It is locally known as 'Silathoranam' in Telugu language, with 'sila' meaning rock and 'thoranam' meaning garland.

The arch is carved out of quartzite rock of the Kadapa subgroup by consistent erosion. It is dated to the of the underlying quartzite rock, and is dated to the Middle to Upper Proterozoic era (1600 to 570 Mya). The Kadapa subgroup consists of sandstone rocks with volcanic sequences in the form of sills and dykes, resting on Archean gneiss rock, separated by an Eparchaean Unconformity.

== See also ==
- List of rock formations in India
