= Kurnool revenue division =

- revenue division in Kurnool district
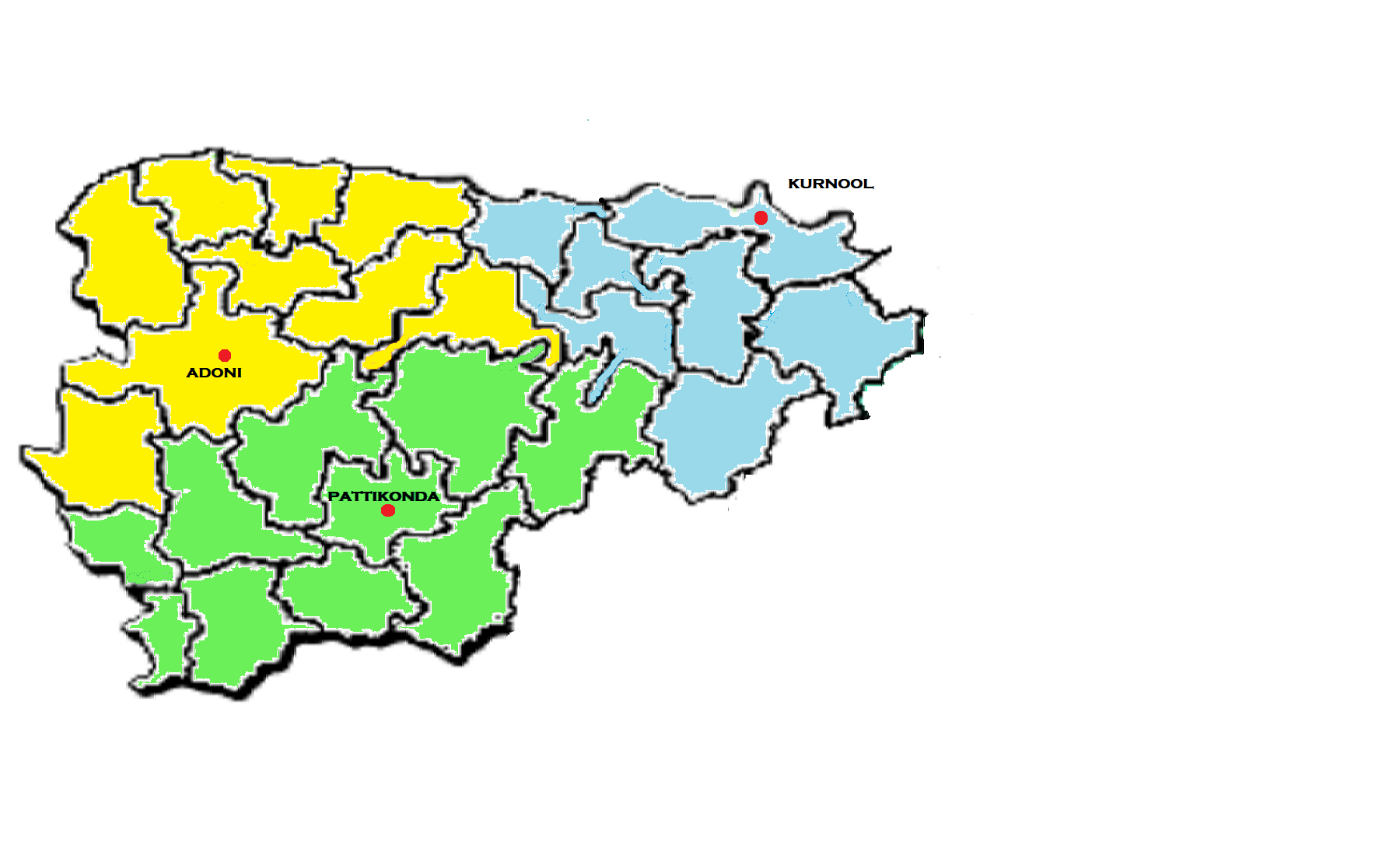
- Kurnool revenue division in kurnool district
- Country: India
- State: Andhra Pradesh
- District: Kurnool
- Headquarters: kurnool
- Time zone: UTC+05:30 (IST)

Kurnool revenue division (or Kurnool division) is an administrative division in the Kurnool district of the Indian state of Andhra Pradesh. It is one of the 3 revenue divisions in the district with 8 mandals under its administration. The divisional headquarters is located at Kurnool.

== History ==
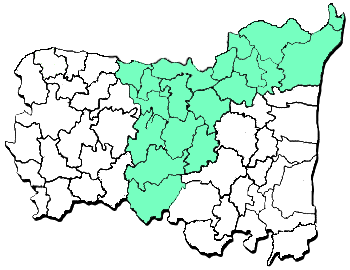

Kurnool revenue division in old kurnool district

== Administration ==
There are 8 mandals administered under the revenue division. They are:

No.	Mandals
1	Kallur mandal
2	Orvakal mandal
3	C.Belagal mandal
4	Gudur mandal
5	Kurnool Urban mandal
6	Kurnool Rural mandal
7	Kodumur mandal
8	Veldurthi mandal

== See also ==
- List of revenue divisions in Andhra Pradesh
