= Pesaravai =

Village in Andhra Pradesh, India

- Revenue Village
- Interactive map of Pesaravai
- Location in Andhra Pradesh, India Pesaravai (India)
- Coordinates: 15°39′09″N 78°29′10″E
- Country: India
- State: Andhra Pradesh
- District: Nandyal
- Mandal: Gadivemula

Government
  - Type: Sarpanch

Languages
  - Official: Telugu
- Time zone: UTC+5:30 (IST)
- PIN: 518523

Pesaravai is a village located in Gadivemula mandal, Nandyal district, Andhra Pradesh, India. It is in Panyam Assembly constituency.
