= Kundhanagurthy =

- Village
- Interactive map of Kundhanagurthy
- Location within Andhra Pradesh
- Coordinates: 15°15′23″N 77°18′34″E
- Country: India
- State: Andhra Pradesh
- District: Kurnool
- Mandal: Alur
- Time zone: UTC+05:30 (IST)

Kundhanagurthy is a village in Alur taluka of Kurnool district in Andhra Pradesh, India.

== Village ==
The village is located 14;km from Guntakal and 19;km from Aluru. It is connected by bus to both towns.

Most of the people are farmers; there is only one crop a year because of the limited supply of rainwater.

== Temples ==
The following temples are located in Kundhanagurthy:

1. Sivalingaruda Swamy temple(శివలి౦గారుఢ సామి)
2. Siva temple (శివలి౦గ రూప౦)
3. Hanumantharaya temple (హనుమ౦తుడు)
4. Basavanna temple (బసవన)
5. Sangameswara temple (స౦గమేశుడు)
6. Bata Sunkulamma temple (సు౦కులమ దేవి)

== Festival ==
During the festival of Maha Shivaratri, the Rathayatraa (తేరు) in this village is the special attraction. In 2012 a new RATHAM was made to replace the old one, at a cost of 20 Lakhs of Rupees, by contributions from the village people.
