= Pattikonda mandal =

- Mandal
- Interactive Map Outlining mandal
- Location in Andhra Pradesh, India
- Coordinates: 15.3996°N 77.4980°E
- Country: India
- State: Andhra Pradesh
- District: Kurnool
- Headquarters: Pattikonda

Population (2011)
  - Total: 68,962

Languages
  - Official: Telugu
- Time zone: UTC+5:30 (IST)

Pattikonda mandal is one of the 26 mandals in Kurnool district of the state of Andhra Pradesh in India. It is under the administration of Pattikonda revenue division and the headquarters are located at Pattikonda.
