= Adoni Urban mandal =

Mandal in Kurnool district, Andhra Pradesh, India

Adoni-1 mandal
- Mandal
- Interactive map of Adoni-1 mandal
- Location in Andhra Pradesh, India
- Coordinates: 15°37′28″N 77°16′23″E
- Country: India
- State: Andhra Pradesh
- District: Kurnool
- Headquarters: Adoni
- Time zone: UTC+05:30 (IST)

Adoni-1 mandal is one of the mandals in Kurnool district in the Indian state of Andhra Pradesh. It is a part of Adoni revenue division.

== History ==
The mandal carved out from Adoni mandal which was made part of the Kurnool district on 31 December 2025.

== Villages in the Mandal ==
=== Revenue villages ===
The Revenue Villages of This mandal are :

1. Adoni
2. Kallubavi
3. Vengalapuram
4. Parvathapuram
5. Mandagiri
6. S. Kondapuram
7. Isvi
8. Gonabavi
9. Dibbanakallu
10. Nettekallu
11. Arekallu
12. Baichigeri
13. Salakalakonda
14. Virupapuram
15. Doddanakeri
16. Sambagallu
17. Huvvanur
18. Kapati
19. Basarakodu
20. Chinnapendekallu
21. Mantriki
22. Sultanapuram
23. Pesalabanda
