= Karimaddela =

Karimaddula
- village
- Interactive map of Karimaddula
- Country: India
- State: Andhra Pradesh
- District: Nandyal
- Mandal: Gadivemula

Languages
  - Official: Telugu
- Time zone: UTC+5:30 (IST)
- Vehicle registration: AP

Karimaddula is a village in the Gadivemula mandal, Nandyal district of Andhra Pradesh, India. With a population of 3881 as per the census 2011, This village comes under panyam assembly constituency and nandyal parliamentary constituency.
