= Phantom Rock =

- Phantom Para
- Cheengeri Mala
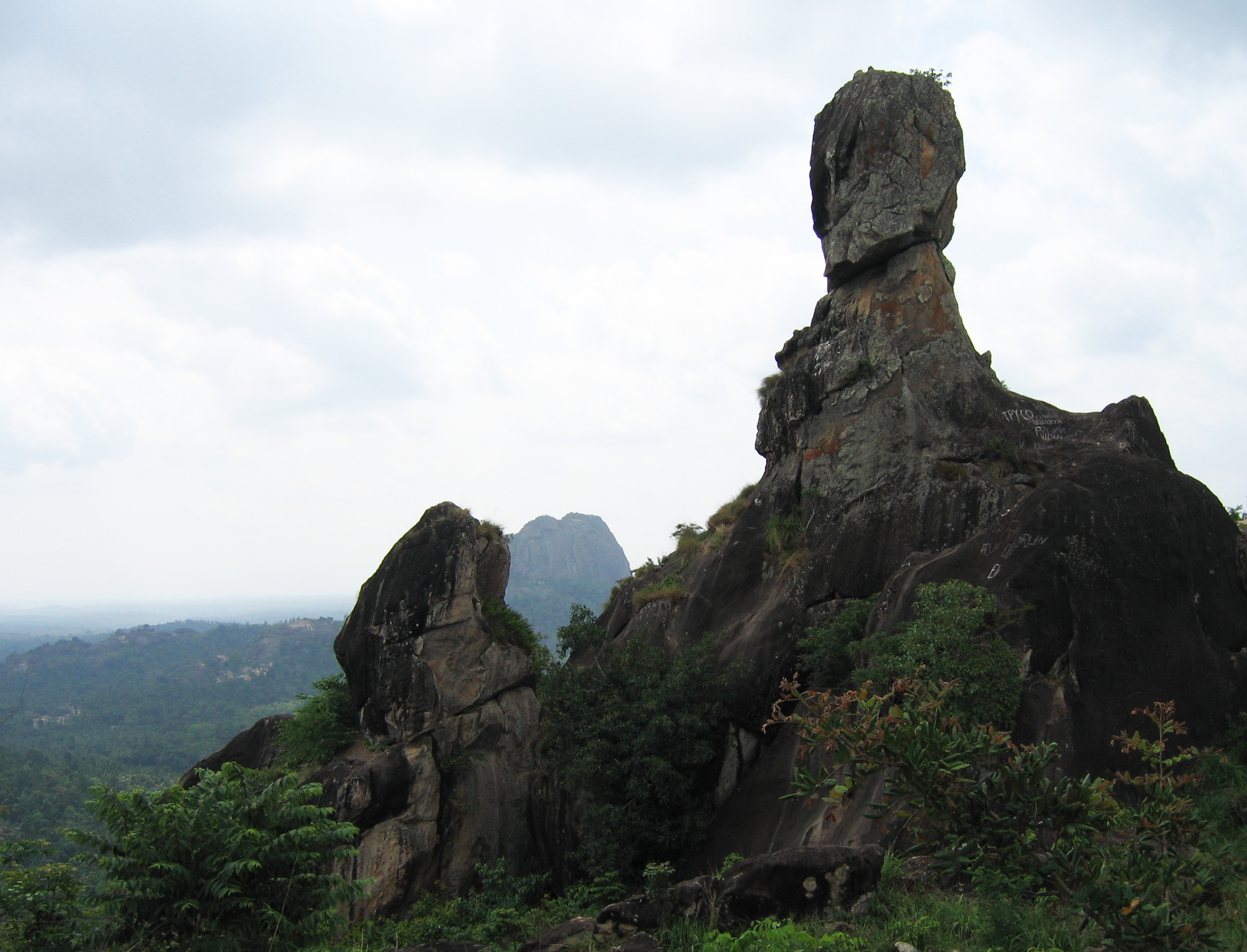

- Location within Kerala
- 11°38′11.8824″N 76°12′16.5882″E
- Location: Ambalavayal

Phantom Rock is a tourist destination in Ambalavayal in the district of Wayanad in Kerala. It is a natural metamorphic rock formation resembling a human skull, and thus is known as Phantom Rock.

This structure is situated 17 km from Kalpetta and can be reached by trekking. It stands at a height of 2600 feet above sea level. It is near "Cheengeri Mala". Edakkal Caves is also nearby.

== Threats ==
Unscientific and unregulated granite mining is posing a serious threat to the fragile natural rock structure.

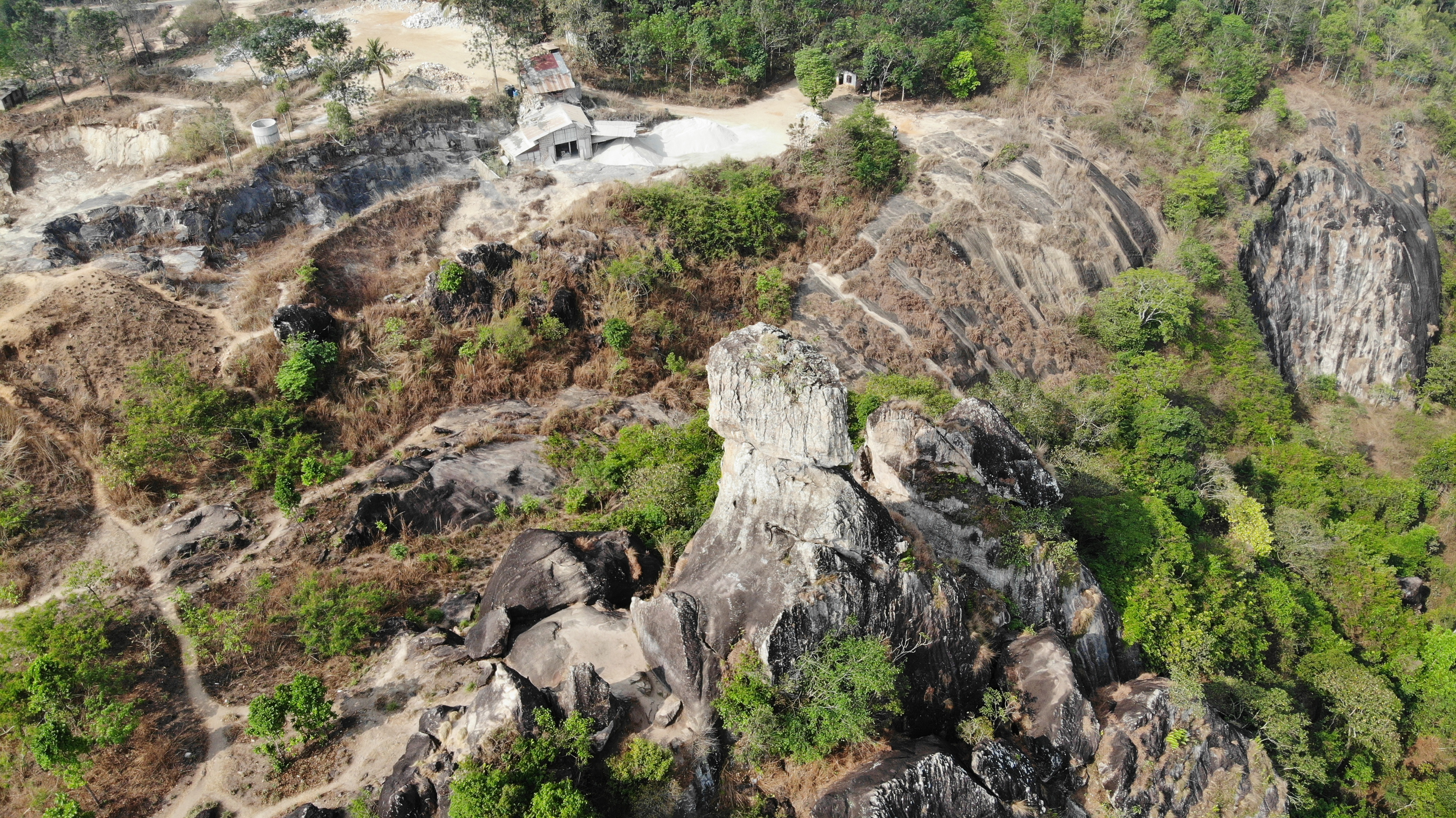
Phantom Rock Aerial with nearby granite quarry

== Gallery ==
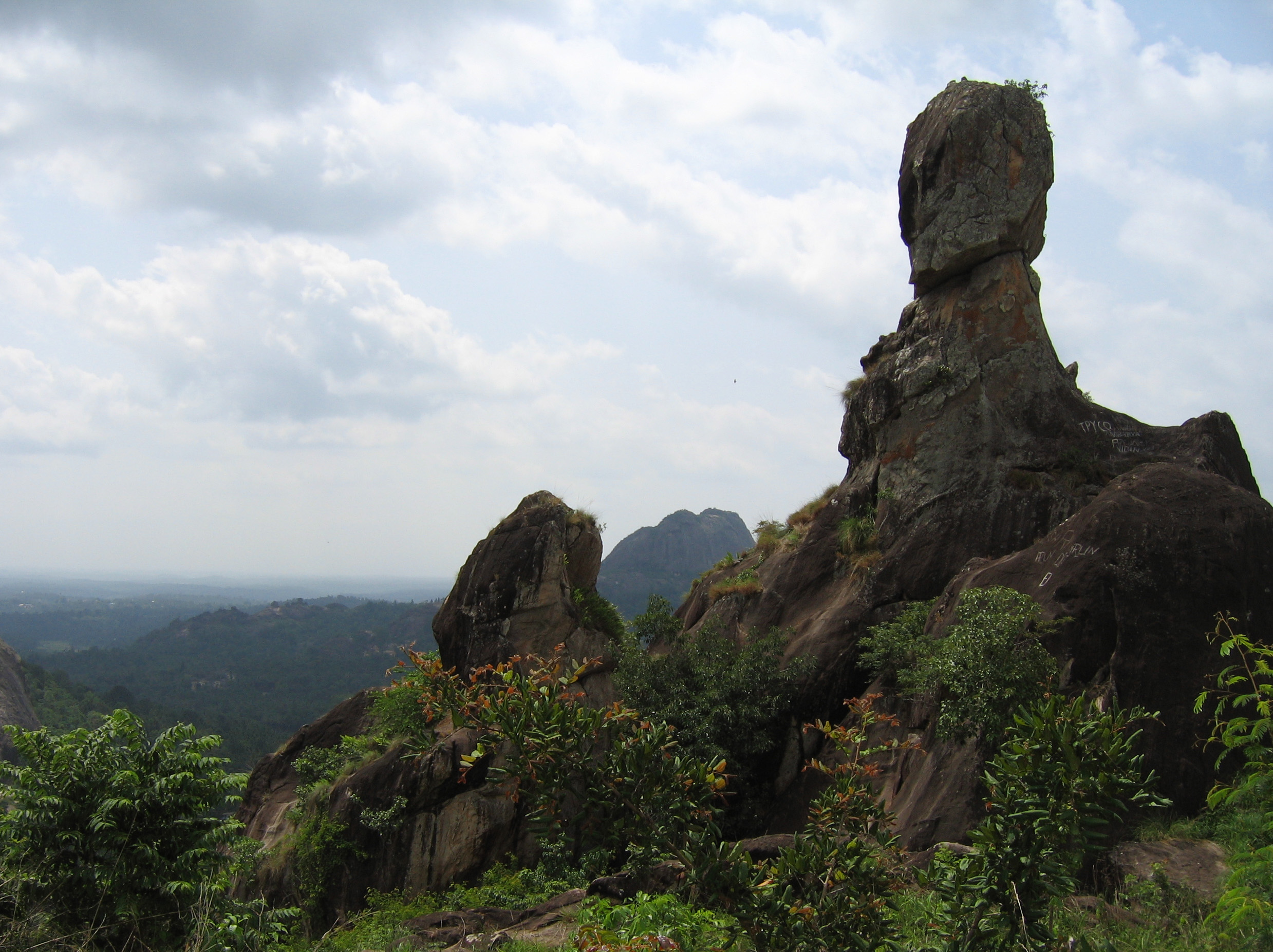

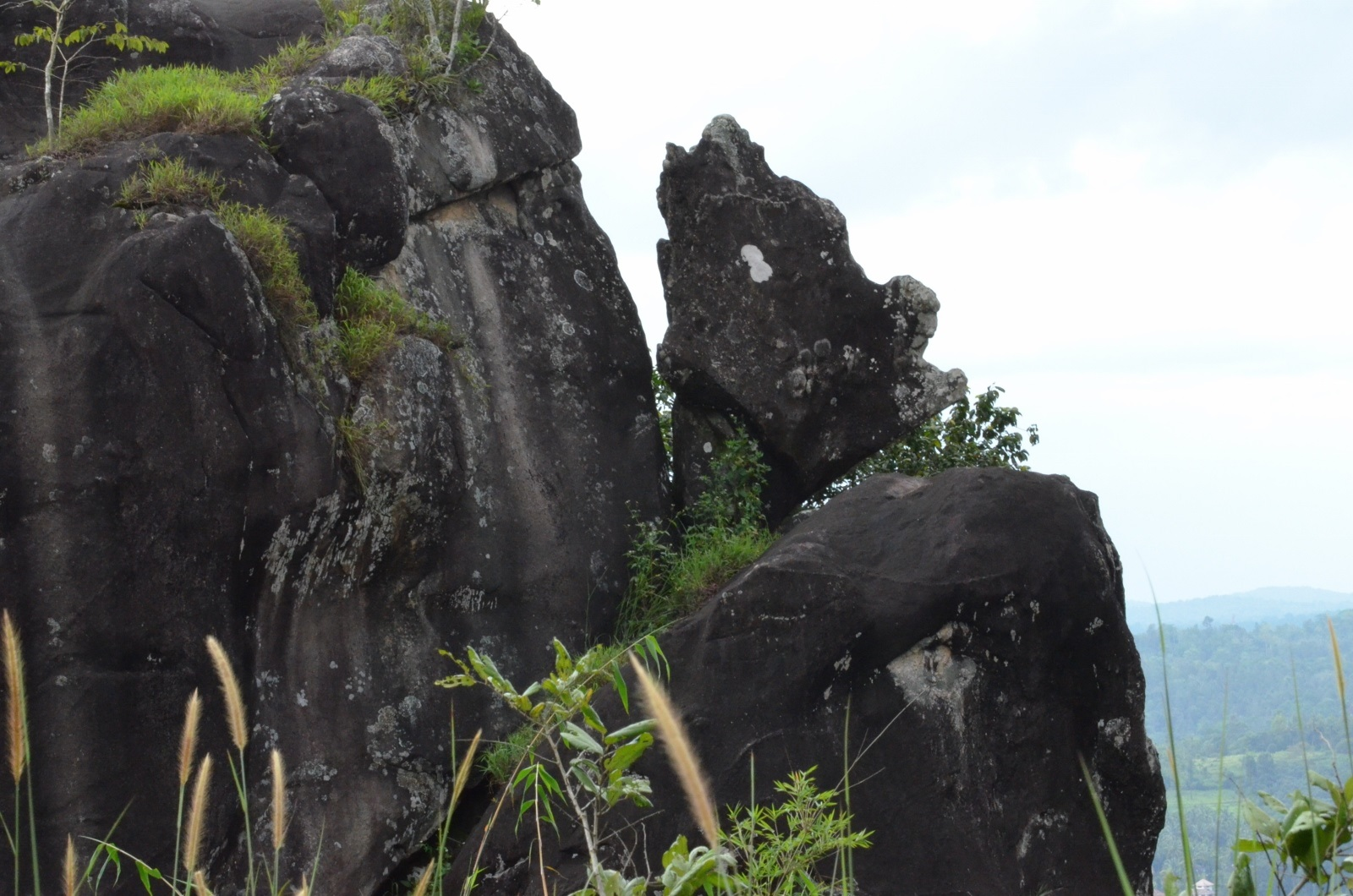

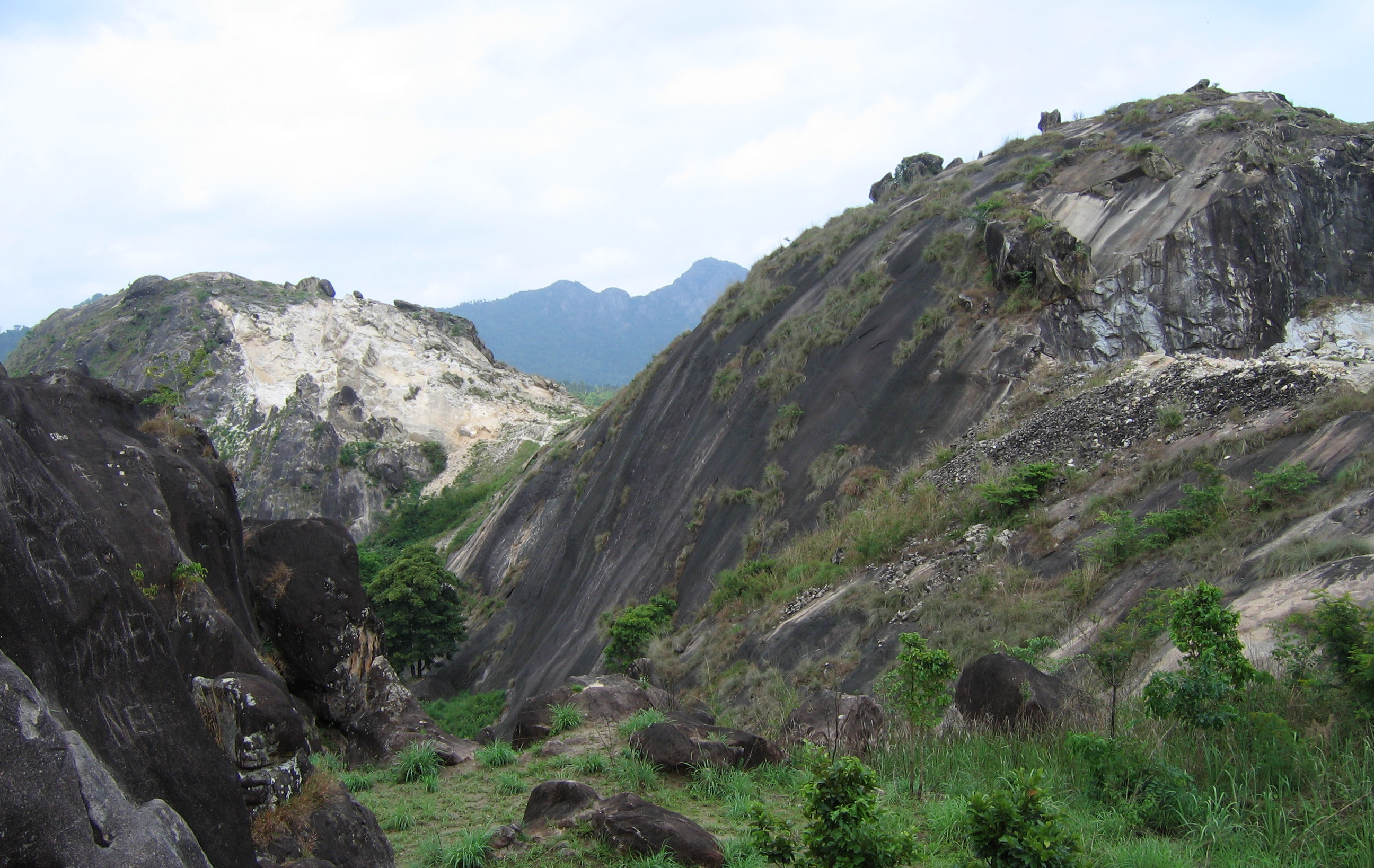

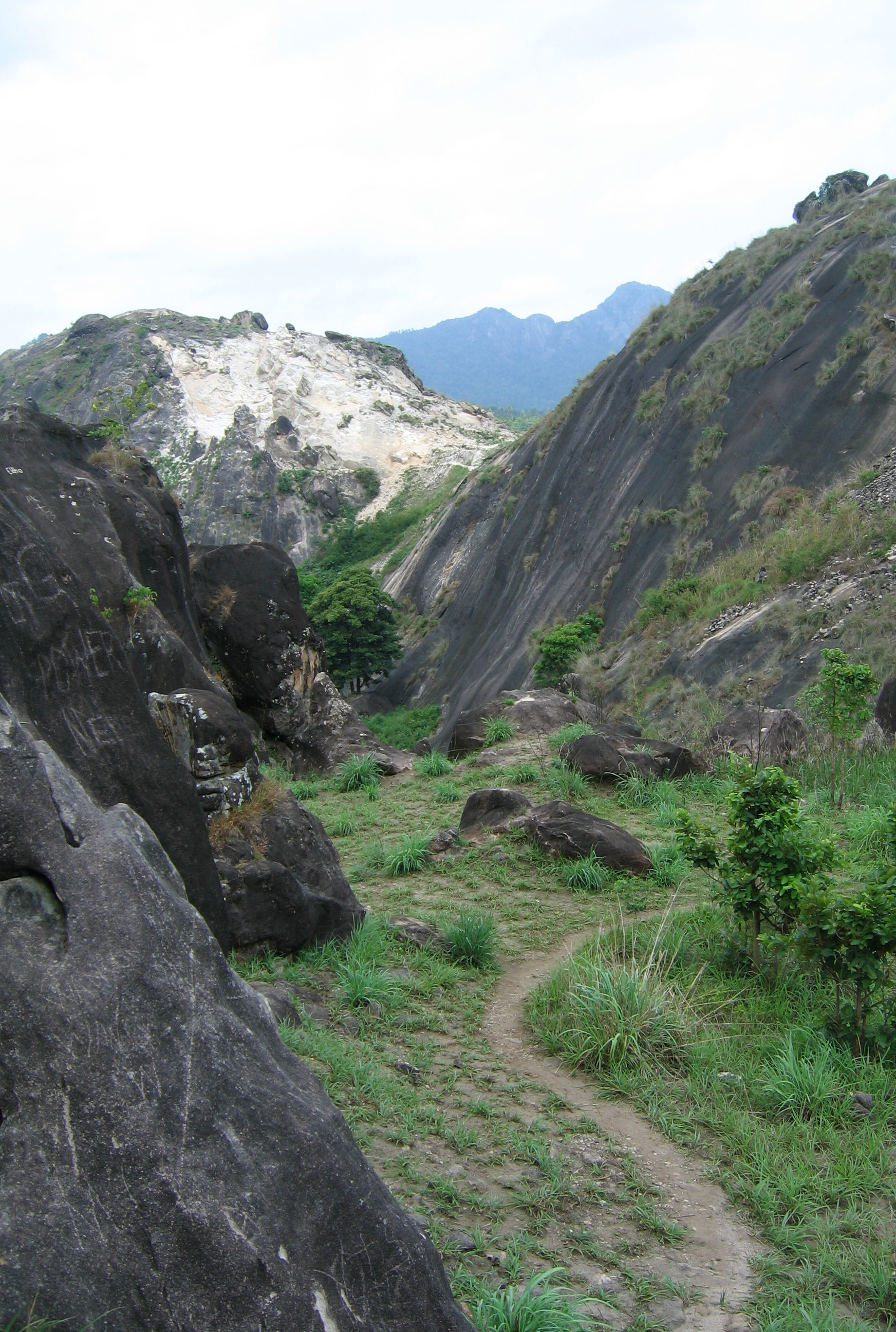
