= Ankireddy Pally =

- Village
- Interactive map of Ankireddy Pally
- Coordinates: 15.0275°N 78.0484°E
- Country: India
- State: Andhra Pradesh

Area
  - Total: 26.4 km^{2} (10.2 sq mi)

Population (2020)
  - Total: 2,689
  - Density: 102/km^{2} (264/sq mi)

Languages
  - Official: Telugu
- Time zone: UTC+5:30 (IST)
- Telephone code: 040
- Vehicle registration: AP-21 X XXXX
- Sex ratio: 1:1(approx) ♂/♀
- Website: andhra%20pradesh.gov.in

Ankireddy Pally is a village in Nandyal district in Andhra Pradesh, India. It falls under kollimigundla mandal.
