= Mittakandala =

Coordinates: 15.804°N 78.477°E

- village
- Interactive map of Mittakandala
- Country: India
- State: Andhra Pradesh
- District: Nandyal
- Mandal: Pamulapadu

Languages
  - Official: Telugu
- Time zone: UTC+5:30 (IST)

Mittakandala is a village in Pamulapadu mandal, Nandyal district, Andhra Pradesh state in India.
