= Orvakal Rock Garden, Kurnool =

Park in Andhra Pradesh, India

Orvakal Rock Garden
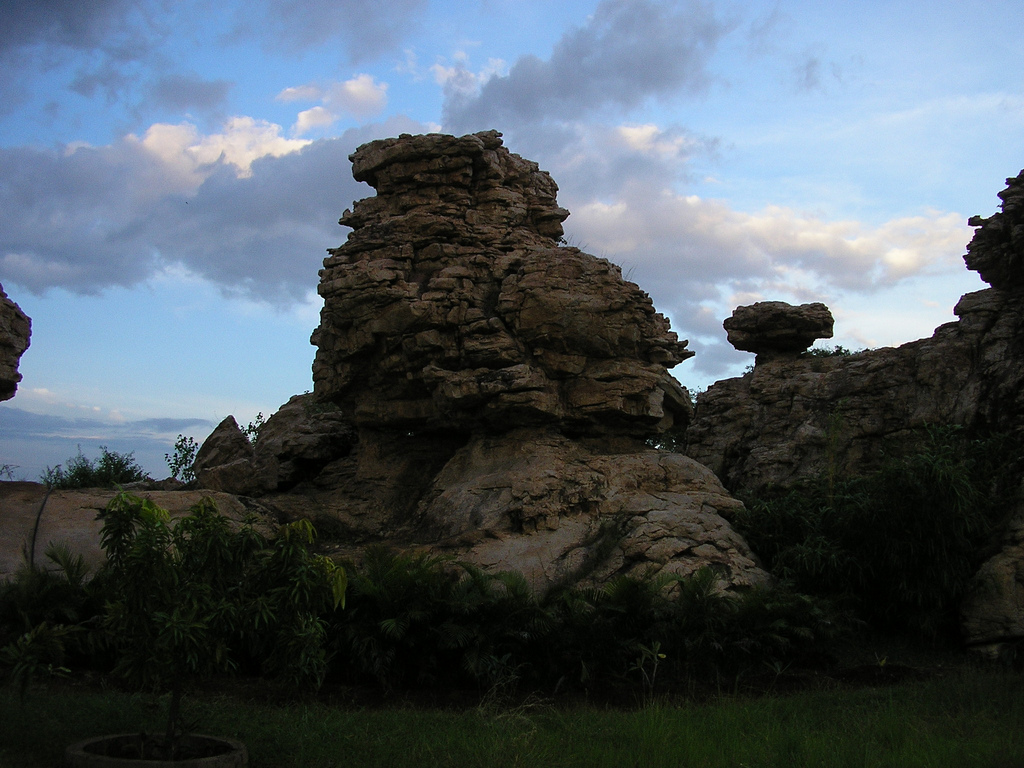

- Location within Andhra Pradesh Location within India
- Type: Sculpture garden
- Location: Kurnool, Andhrapradesh, India
- Nearest city: Kurnool, Andhra Pradesh, India
- Coordinates: 15°41′30″N 78°09′09″E
- Area: Kurnool
- Created: APTDC
- Open: 24 Hours
- Status: Present

Orvakal Rock Garden, or Oravakallu Rock Garden, is the 1000 acre Sculpture Garden park with natural cave and igneous rock formations between pools of water. It is located on NH-40 highway, near the village of Orvakal, about 20 kilometres (12 mi) from Kurnool, Andhra Pradesh, southern India. There is a lot of facilities include Boating, Hotel etc.,

The park, with hiking paths that snake up a hill, was developed by the Andhra Pradesh Tourism Development Corporation (APTDC). The content of the rocks is quartz and silica, a raw material for the glass industry. Several companies have petitioned for the ability to mine the area, which raises ecological concerns.

The garden has been a site for film production, which has resulted in another ecological concern due to plaster of paris remnants left at the park after the movies were completed.

== Films shootings ==
Jayam Manadera, Takkari Donga, Subash Chandra Bose (film), Baahubali: The Beginning.

== See also ==
- List of rock formations in India
