= C.Belagal =

Coordinates: 15°49′08″N 77°40′22″E

C. Belagal is a village and headquarters of C. Belagal mandal in Kurnool district, Andhra Pradesh, India.
