= Gadivemula =

Village in Andhra Pradesh, India

- Mandal
- Interactive map of Gadivemula
- Location in Andhra Pradesh, India
- Coordinates: 15.707002°N 78.416862°E
- Country: India
- State: Andhra Pradesh
- District: Nandyal district
- Talukas: Gadivemula

Population (June 2012)
  - Total: 15,000

Languages
  - Official: Telugu
- Time zone: UTC+5:30 (IST)
- PIN: 518508
- Vehicle registration: AP

Gadivemula is a village and capital of Gadivemula mandal in Nandyal district in the state of Andhra Pradesh in India.

== Geography ==
Gadivemula is situated 27 km from district headquarter Nandyal. It has good transportation from all over the towns surrounded like Nandyal, Nandikotkur, Atmakur and Kurnool.
