= Jaradoddi Sudhakar =

Indian politician and dentist

Jaradoddi Sudhakar (born 1976) is an Indian politician from Andhra Pradesh. He is an MLA of YSR Congress Party from Kodumur Assembly constituency which is reserved for SC Community in the Kurnool district. He won the 2019 Andhra Pradesh Legislative Assembly election.

== Early life and education ==
He is born in Yerragudi village, Krishnagiri mandal. His father is Anandamu. He completed his Master of Dental Surgery from Government Dental College, Hyderabad and worked as a dentist. Earlier, he also worked as a journalist.

== Career ==
Sudhakar won the 2019 Andhra Pradesh Legislative Assembly election from Kodumur Assembly constituency on YSR Congress Party ticket defeating Burla Ramanjaneyulu of Telugu Desam Party by a margin of 36,045 votes. As a medical specialist, he has also written many research articles. He was denied a ticket to contest the 2024 Assembly election as YSRCP nominated Audimulapu Sateesh to contest from Kodumur constituency.
