= Adoni =

- City
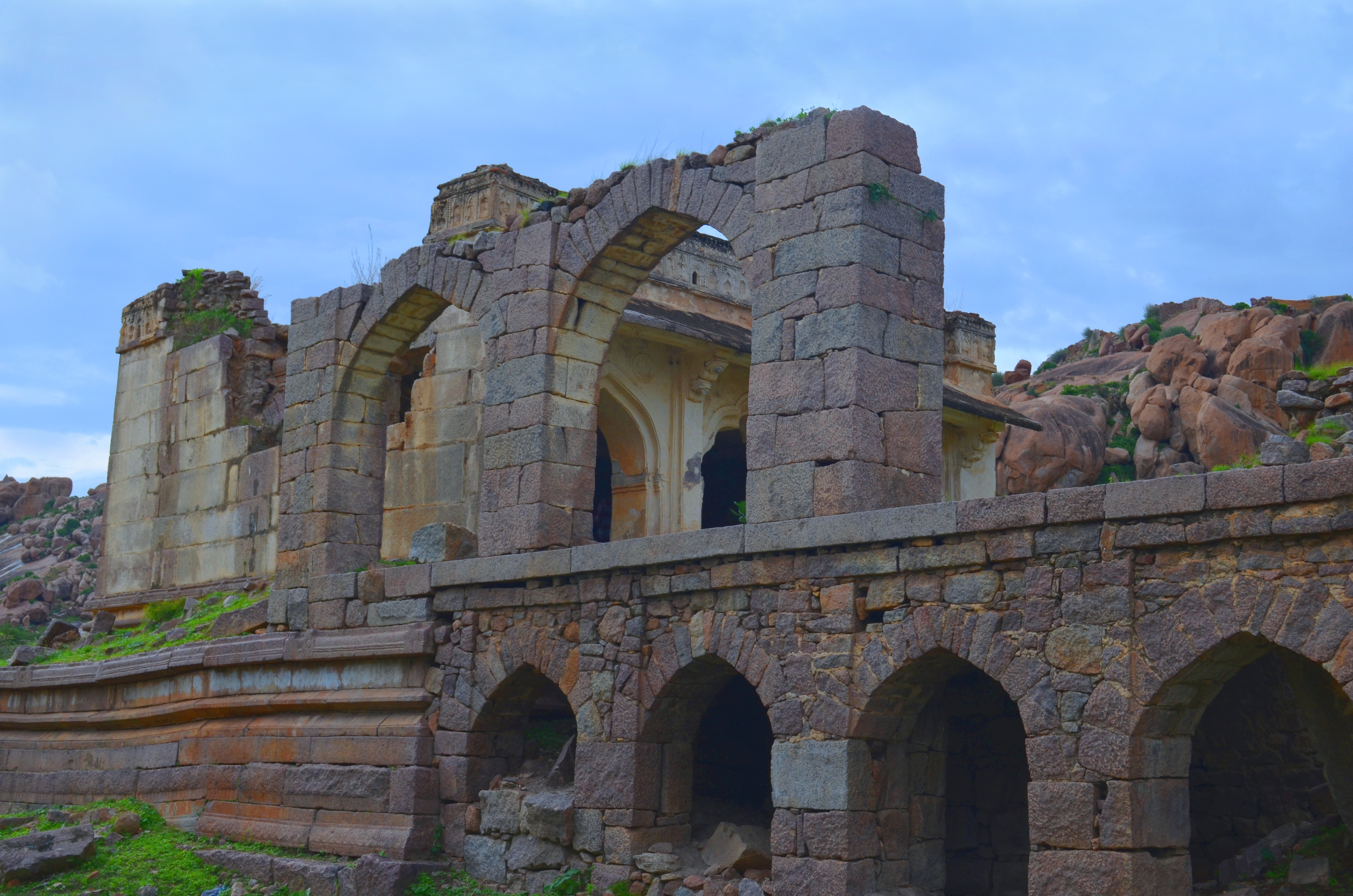
- Adoni Fort

- Location in Andhra Pradesh, India Adoni (India) Adoni (Asia)
- Coordinates: 15°37′28″N 77°16′23″E
- Country: India
- State: Andhra Pradesh
- District: Kurnool

Government
  - Type: Municipal Council
  - MLA: P. V. Parthasarathi (Bharatiya Janata Party)

Area
  - City: 38.16 km^{2} (14.73 sq mi)
  - Rank: 13th (in AP)
- Elevation: 435 m (1,427 ft)

Population (2011)
  - City: 184,625
  - Rank: 15th (in AP)
  - Density: 4,838/km^{2} (12,530/sq mi)
  - Metro: 184,625
- Demonym: N/A

Languages
  - Official: Telugu
- Time zone: UTC+5:30 (IST)
- PIN: 518301,518302
- Telephone code: +91–08512
- Vehicle registration: AP–21 and AP-39
- Sex ratio: 1008 ♂/♀
- Lok Sabha constituency: Kurnool
- Assembly constituency: Adoni
- Website: Adoni Municipality

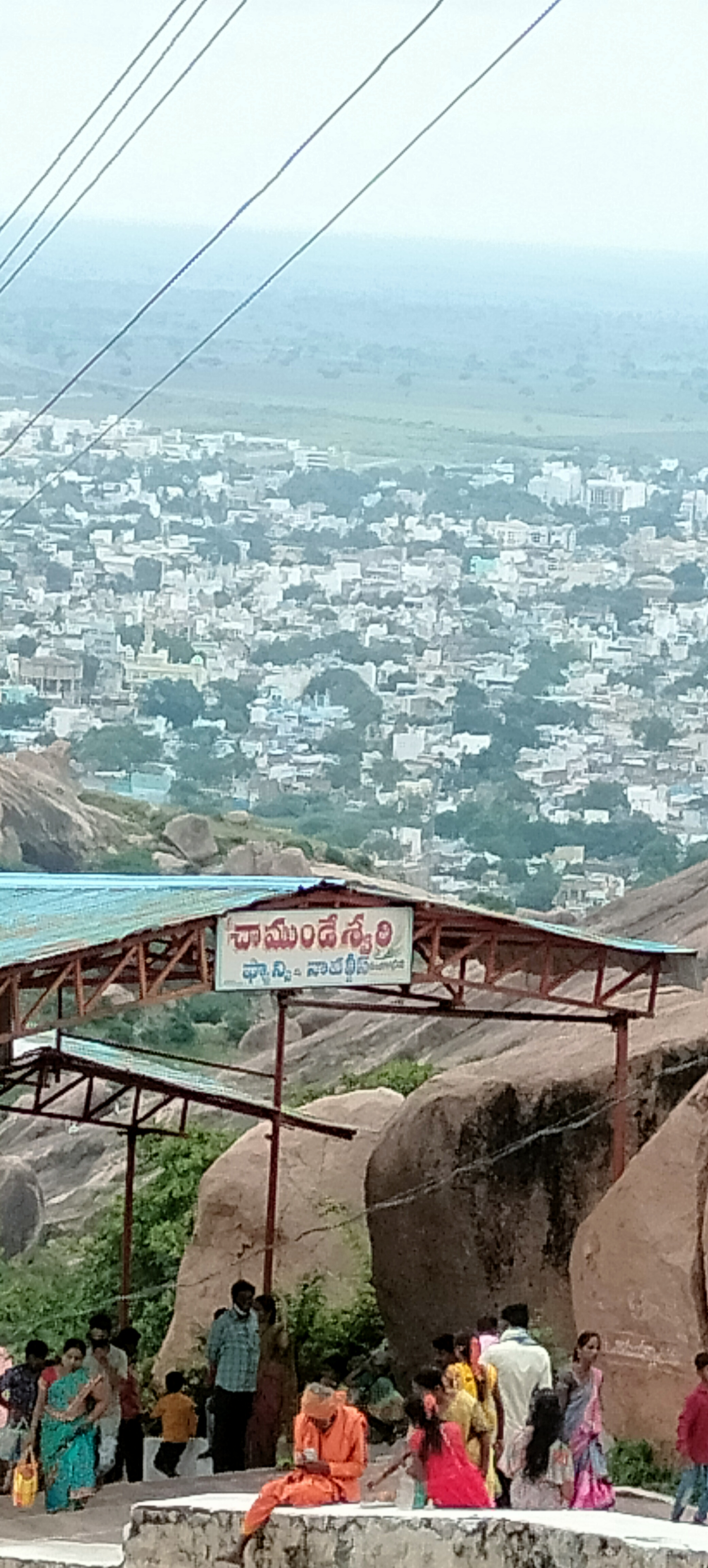

Adoni or Adavani is a city in the Kurnool district in the Indian state of Andhra Pradesh. It is a municipality and the headquarters of Adoni Urban mandal, Adoni Rural mandal which administered under the Adoni revenue division. In the 2011 census of India, Adoni had a population of 166,345, making it the 16th most populous city in the state with an urban agglomeration population of 184,625.

== History ==
The Adoni fort is central to the city's history. In 1780, an observer wrote,

"Adoni is situated upon three mountains which are united; it has a range of irregular fortifications, piled one over the other. To maintain it requires a garrison of 30,000 men. The fortifications upon the mountains are often weak...To the south of Adoni, a large plain, to the north there are mountains, obnoxious from their nearness, to the east there are other mountains. To the west there are also mountains and this part is the weakest."

It is thought to have been founded by Chandra Sen in 1200 BC and later came into the medieval kingdom of Vijayanagara which flourished from the 14th to the 16th centuries. The fort then became the stronghold of the Muslim kings of the Adil Shahi dynasty of Bijapur and Golconda. In 1690 the fort was taken by Aurangzeb then in the late 18th century it came to the Raja of Mysore, Tipu Sultan before it was ceded to the British in 1799. In the 15th century and early to mid 16th century, Adoni was a fort town of the Vijayanagara Empire. It was controlled by the kinsmen of Aliya Rama Raya, a powerful aristocrat of the Vijayanagara Empire.

In 1558, during the decline of the Vijayanagara Empire, control of Adoni came to Ali Adil Shah I (1558–1579), the fifth Sultan of the Bijapur Sultanate. Hamilton, in 1820, stated,

"It [Adoni at this time] stood at the top of a high hill, and contained within its walls many tanks and fountains of pure water with numerous princely structures."

In 1564, the Sultanate of Bijapur lost control of Adoni to Mohammedan rulers.

From 1678 to 1688, rule of Adoni lay with Siddi Masud, a wealthy Habshi (African) from Abyssinia who was a powerful general of Raja Anup Singh of Bikaner, Siddi Masud improved the fort; cleared the surrounding forest; established the townships of Imatiazgadh and Adilabad and constructed the Shahi Jamia Masjid. Siddi Masud was also an avid art collector and a patron of the Kurnool school of painting. In 1688, Adoni was attacked by Firuz Jang, a Mughal general. Siddi Musud surrendered with his courtiers and family.

At the fall of the Mughal Empire, around 1760, Adoni was ruled by governors appointed by the Nizam of Hyderabad, a Mughal splinter clan. One such governor was Salabat Jung, brother of the Nizam. The French supported the appointment. However,

"Salabat Jung was very mild by disposition and neither Bussy nor Dupleix rated his intelligence highly. In fact, Dupleix went to the extent of calling him a duffer."

In 1786, Adoni was besieged for one month and then captured by Tipu Sultan of the Kingdom of Mysore of South India. On 4 May 1799, Tipu Sultan died at the hands of the English. On 15 June 1800, Arthur Wellesley, Marquess of Wellington, wrote to the resident at Hyderabad about appropriate reparations to the Nizam for English occupation of Adoni. Adoni became one of twenty taluqs and in 1810, the Adoni and Nagaldinna taluqs were combined. In 1817 Adoni, at the beginning of the Third Anglo-Maratha War, the British raised a new battalion from other nearby regiments. By 1842, the military had left Adoni because of the perception that the area was susceptible to cholera and because of the unfavourable rugged surrounding geography. Under British rule, South India was divided into several administrative districts. Adoni fell into the district of Bellary of Madras presidency. On 29 April 1861, the acting district engineer of Kurnool wrote to the chief secretary to government at Fort St George,

"North and by east of Bellary, on the Hyderabad road, the only important town is Adoni; it contains a very large population of Mussulmen, and is a place of considerable trade and manufacture."

In 1867, the Adoni and the Bellary Municipal Councils were created. Between 1876 and 1878, a severe El Nino famine affected Adoni and the surrounding areas where nearly one third of the population died. In 1953, after the linguistic reorganisation of the states, Adoni gained its present seat as part of Andhra Pradesh.

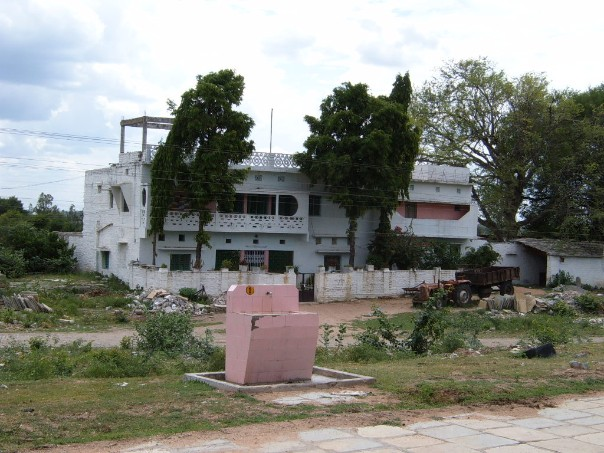
A view of Adoni.

== Geography ==
Adoni has an average elevation of 435 metres (1,427 ft) above sea level. The climate is mainly tropical, with temperatures from 31 °C to 45 °C in summer and 21 °C to 29 °C in winter. The soil is black and red. There are large limestone deposits suitable for cement and minerals such as copper, lead, zinc and in some places, diamonds.

== Demographics ==
Religions in Adoni
Religion	Percent
Hindus	71.02%
Muslims	26.49%
Christians	1.27%
Jainism	0.35%
Others†	0.87%
Distribution of religions †Includes Sikhs (0.2%), Buddhists (<0.2%).

Languages of Adoni City (2011)
1. Telugu (60.5%)
2. Urdu (25.1%)
3. Kannada (6.52%)
4. Marathi (4.66%)
5. Hindi (2.12%)
6. Tamil (0.88%)
7. Others (0.19%)

The 2011 Census recorded a population of 166,537. The total population included 82,743 males and 83,794 females. These numbers resulted in gender ratio of 1013 females per 1000 males, which was higher than the national average of 940 per 1000. In the same year, 18,406 children were between 0 and 6 years of age. In this group, 9,355 were boys and 9,051 were girls, giving a gender ratio of 968 per 1000. The average literacy rate was 68.38 percent with 101,292 literate people. This number was significantly lower than the national average of 73 percent.

The urban agglomeration had a population of 184,771, of which 92,006 were male and 92,765 were female, giving a gender ratio of 1008 females per 1000 males. Children aged 0 to 6 years numbered 20,517. There were 112,151 literate people giving an average literacy rate of 68.28 percent.

== Economy ==
Adoni is an important trading center with a large market situated in the center of the city. Adoni is a large producer of cotton and has a substantial ginning and textile industry. The next most important industry is groundnut oil. Adoni is an important trading center in Andhra Pradesh with a large market situated in the center of the town.

== Landmarks ==
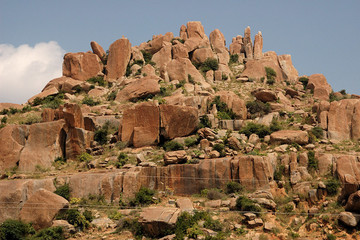
Rock formations at Adoni Hills

Historical Adoni Fort, the historic Sri Ranamandla Konda and Shri Renuka Yellamma temples, Ramjala, Shahi Jamia Masjid.

Road

NH 167 passes through the city of Adoni. APSRTC operates buses from the Adoni bus station.

=== Rail ===
The Adoni railway station and its connections were built during British rule in 1870 and is now a part of the South Central Railway on the Solapur-Guntakal line which is part of Bengaluru-Mumbai, Chennai-Mumbai line.

== Education ==
The primary and secondary school education is administered by the government and supplemented by private schools, under the School Education Department of the state.

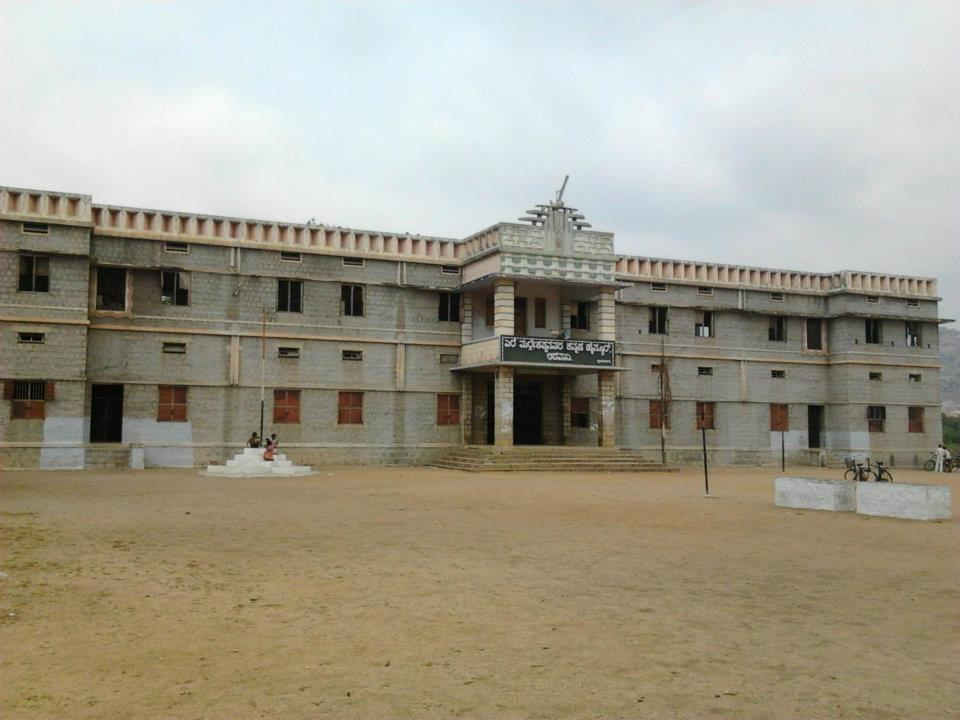
Yalle Malleshappa Kannada Kannada High School

YMK (Yelle Malleshappa Kannada) High School is a Government Aided co-educational school in Adoni. Founded in 1947, it is affiliated to the Board of Secondary Education, Andhra Pradesh. It prepares students for the SSC (Std 10).

== Adoni Population According to census 2011 ==
The current estimate population of Adoni city in 2025 is 241,000 , while Adoni metro population is estimated at 268,000 . The last census was conducted in 2011 and the schedule census for Adoni city in 2021 was postponed due to Covid. The current estimates of Adoni city are based on past growth rate. Once govt conducts census for Adoni city, we will update the same here in 2025. As per provisional reports of Census India, population of Adoni in 2011 is 166,344. Although Adoni city has population of 166,344; its urban / metropolitan population is 184,625.

== Adoni Literacy Rate and Sex Ratio ==
In education section, total literates in Adoni city are 96,692 of which 53,619 are males while 43,073 are females. Average literacy rate of Adoni city is 65.94 percent of which male and female literacy was 74.02 and 58.06 percent. The sex ratio of Adoni city is 1017 per 1000 males. Child sex ratio of girls is 965 per 1000 boys.

== Adoni Slum Population ==
Total no. of Slums in Adoni city & its Out Growth numbers 20,613 in which population of 105,128 resides. This is around 56.94% of total population of Adoni city & its outgrowth which is 184,625.

== Adoni Religion ==
Hinduism is majority religion in Adoni city with 71.02 % followers. Islam is second most popular religion in city of Adoni with approximately 26.49 % following it. In Adoni city, Christianity is followed by 1.27 %, Jainism by 0.35 %, Sikhism by 0.02 % and Buddhism by 0.01 %. Around 0.04 % stated 'Other Religion', approximately 0.80 % stated 'No Particular Religion'.

== Census Index ==
Religion	Percentage	Total
Hindu	71.02 %	131,121
Muslims	26.49 %	48,903
Christian	1.27 %	2,347
Sikh	0.02 %	45
Buddhist	0.01 %	19
Jain	0.35 %	648
Others	0.04 %	69
Not Stated	0.80 %	1,473

== See also ==
- List of cities in Andhra Pradesh by population
- List of municipalities in Andhra Pradesh
- Kurnool district
- Rayalaseema
- Adoni (Assembly constituency)
- Adoni Urban mandal
- Adoni Rural mandal
- Andhra Pradesh Legislative Assembly
- South Central Railway zone
- Andhra Pradesh State Road Transport Corporation
- List of cities in India by population
- List of urban agglomerations in Andhra Pradesh
- History of Andhra Pradesh
- List of forts in Andhra Pradesh
