= Pattikonda revenue division =

Administrative division in Andhra Pradesh, India

Pattikonda Revenue Division
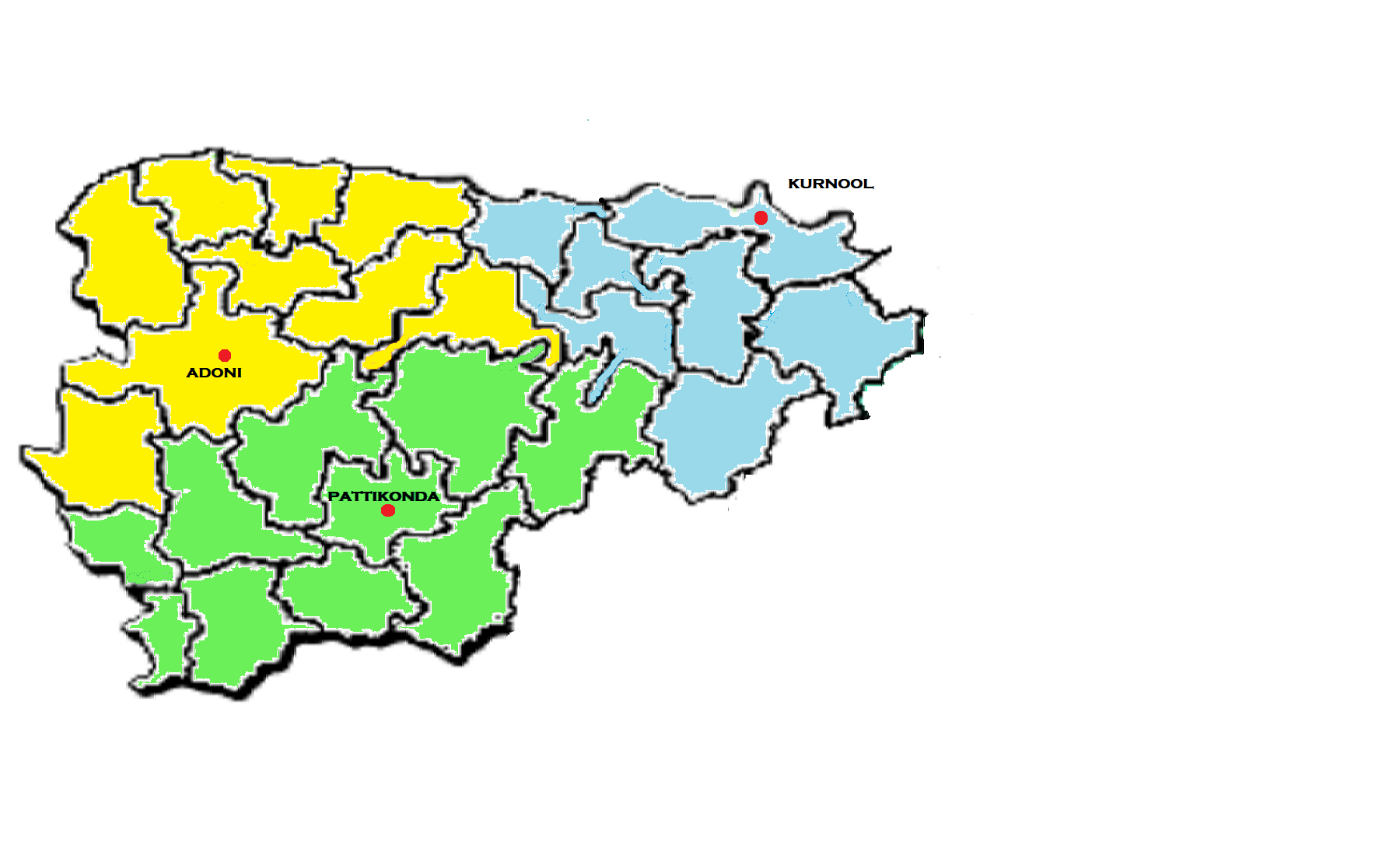
- Pattikonda Revenue Division in kurnool district
- Country: India
- State: Andhra Pradesh
- District: Kurnool
- Formed: 4 April 2022
- Founder: Government of Andhra Pradesh
- Headquarters: Pattikonda
- Time zone: UTC+05:30 (IST)

Pattikonda revenue division is an administrative division in the Kurnool district of the Indian state of Andhra Pradesh. It is one of the 3 revenue divisions in this district with 9 mandals under its administration. This division is formed on 4 April 2022.

== Mandals ==
The mandals in the revenue division include

| No | Mandals |
|---|---|
| 1 | Halaharvi mandal |
| 2 | Alur mandal |
| 3 | Aspari mandal |
| 4 | Devanakonda mandal |
| 5 | Chippagiri mandal |
| 6 | Pattikonda mandal |
| 7 | Maddikera East mandal |
| 8 | Tuggali mandal |
| 9 | Krishnagiri mandal |
