= Kodumur =

Kodumuru
- town
- Interactive map of Kodumuru
- Location in Andhra Pradesh, India
- Coordinates: 15.6833°N 77.7833°E
- Country: India
- State: Andhra Pradesh
- District: Kurnool
- Talukas: Kodumur

Population (2014)
  - Total: 203,954

Languages
  - Official: Telugu
- Time zone: UTC+5:30 (IST)

Kodumur or Kodumuru is a village and assembly constituency in Kurnool District in the state of Andhra Pradesh in India. The town currently is maintained by Jaradoddi Sudhakar, a member of the Legislative Assembly (MLA) and is under control of the Yuvajana Sramika Rythu YSR Congress Party Former chief ministers Sri Damodaram Sanjeevaiah and Kotla Vijaya Bhaskara Reddy belong to this constituency. It comes under the Kurnool Parliamentary constituency and is the only SC reserved assembly constituency under the Kurnool Parliament segment.

Agriculture is the main source of income for the people of Kodumur, with Cotton, Castor oil seeds, Red gram and vegetables as the main crops. Tungabhadra Project Low Level Canal, the Handri-Neeva Sujala Sravanthi project (HNSS) Main Canal, and the Gajuladinne Project (GDP) Canal (renamed the Sanjeevaiah Sagar), are the main irrigation sources. A major portion of the area of this mandal is arid. Of note, the Kondala Rayudu Temple of Kodumur has a scorpion festival.

== Geography ==
Kodumuru has an average elevation of 342 meters above sea level. The River Hundri passes nearby Kodumur, almost touching every village in the mandal. At Laddagiri Village, the River Hundri meets the Pala Hundri and then the Tungabhadra at Roja near Kurnool. Most of the mandal is covered by inorganic clay ("black cotton") soil, but iron and aluminum-enriched red soil is present in the village of Yerradoddi, and in parts of the Pulakurthi, Pyalakurthi and Laddagiri villages. The entire mandal comes under the Tungabhadra water basin, which is part of the Krishna basin. This mandal receives among the lowest rainfall in the state.
