= Kurnool district =

District of Andhra Pradesh, India

- District of Andhra Pradesh
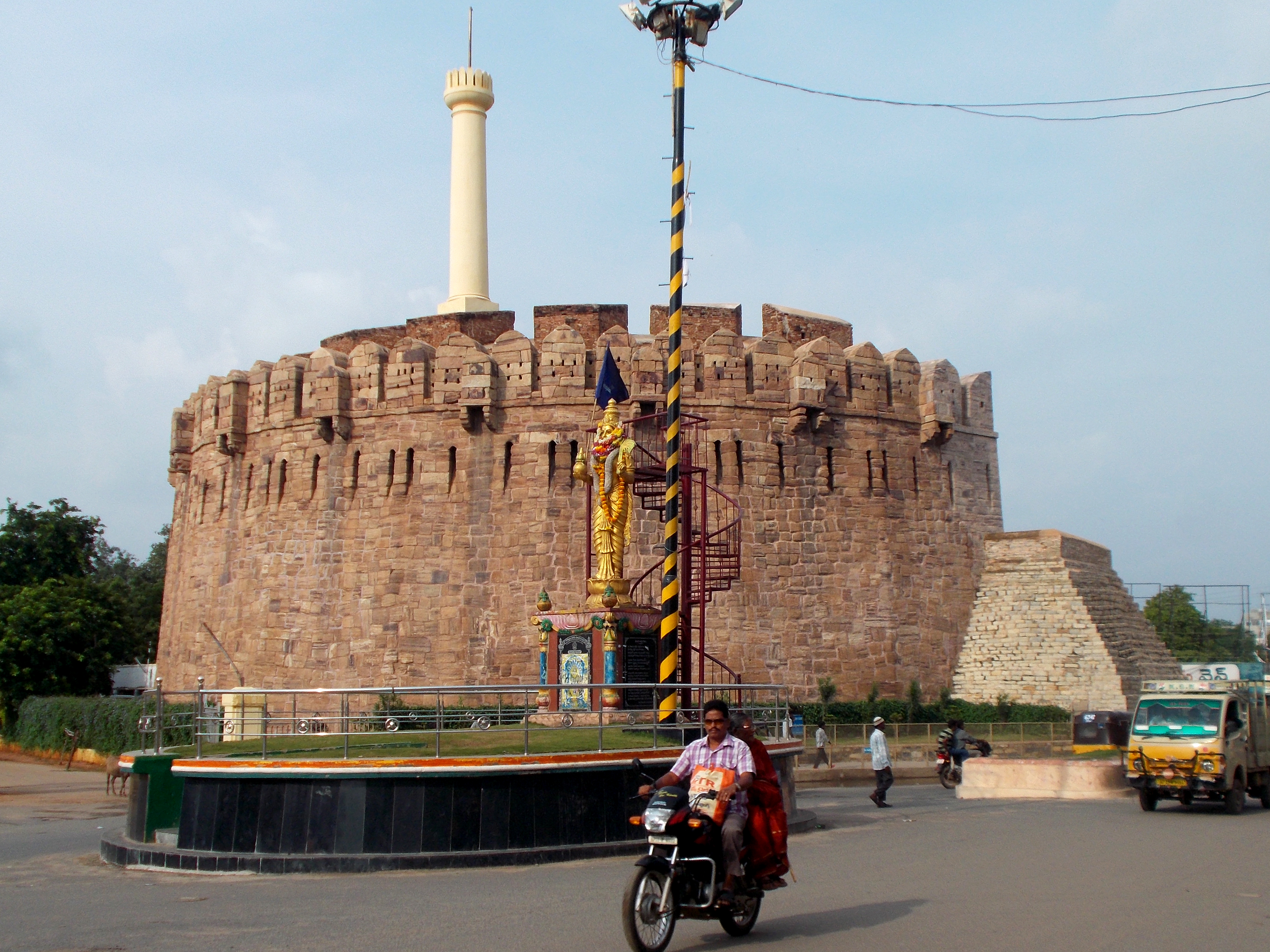
- Konda Reddy Burju

- Location of Kurnool district in Andhra Pradesh
- Interactive map of Kurnool district
- Coordinates: 15.83°N 78.04°E
- Country: India
- State: Andhra Pradesh
- Region: Rayalaseema
- Established: 1808
- 1st Reorganized: 1970
- 2nd Reorganized: 4th April 2022
- Headquarters: Kurnool
- Administrative divisions: List: 3 revenue divisions: Adoni; Kurnool; Pattikonda; 27 mandals; 1 municipal corporation; 3 municipalities; 434 gram panchayats

Government
  - District collector: A. Siri, IAS
  - Lok Sabha: Kurnool
  - Assembly: Assembly list: Adoni; Alur; Kodumur (SC); Kurnool; Mantralayam; Pattikonda; Yemmiganur

Area
  - Total: 7,977 km^{2} (3,080 sq mi)

Population (2011)
  - Total: 2,271,686
  - Density: 284.8/km^{2} (737.6/sq mi)
  - Sex ratio: 988 (females per 1,000 males)

Languages
  - Official: Telugu
  - Additional Official: Urdu

Literacy
- Time zone: UTC+5:30 (IST)
- Postal Index Number: 518xxx
- Area codes: +91–8518
- ISO 3166 code: IN-AP
- Vehicle registration: AP-21 (former) AP–39 (from 30 January 2019)
- District LGD code: 511
- District abbreviation: KUR
- Website: kurnool.ap.gov.in

Kurnool district is one of the eight districts in the Rayalaseema region of the Indian state of Andhra Pradesh after the districts are reorganised in April 2022. It is located in the north western part of the state and is bounded by Nandyal district in the east, Anantapur district in the south, Raichur district of Karnataka in the northwest, Bellary district of Karnataka in the west, and Jogulamba Gadwal district of Telangana in the north. It has a population of 2,271,686 based on the 2011 census. The city of Kurnool is the headquarters of the district. Konda Reddy Fort, Mantralayam and Orvakal Rock Garden, Kurnool are tourist places of interest in the district.

== Etymology ==
The name Kurnool was originally called "Kandenavolu". In the 11th century CE, the Oddera community engaged in construction activity used this place as a halting place for greasing their cartwheels with oil, before crossing the Tungabhadra river. The carts carried loads of stones for temple construction at Alampur. The word oil is known as kandena in Telugu and thus the place was called "Kandenavolu".

== History ==
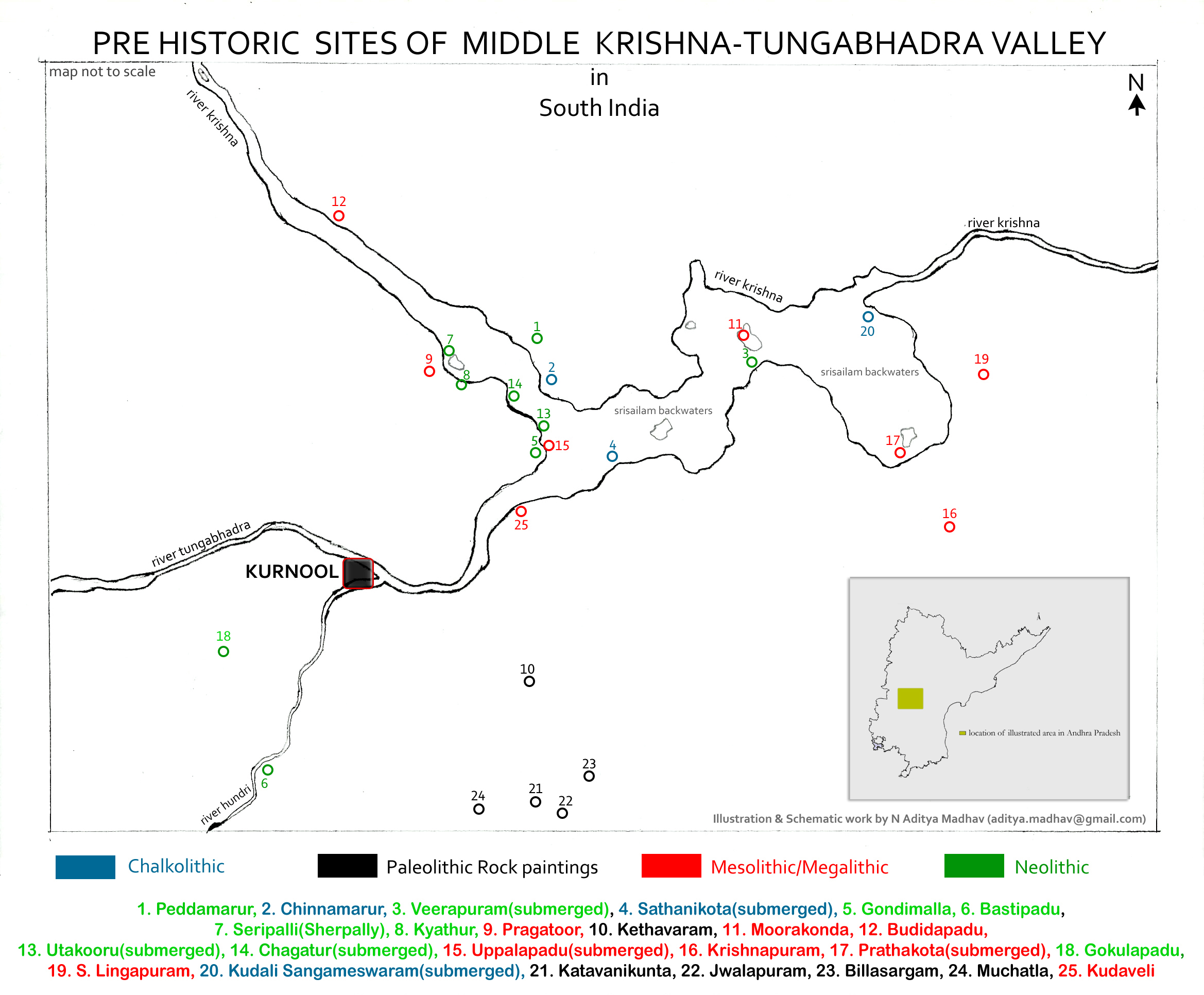
Pre Historic Sites of Krishna-Tungabhadra valley, scattered at different places in Kurnool district

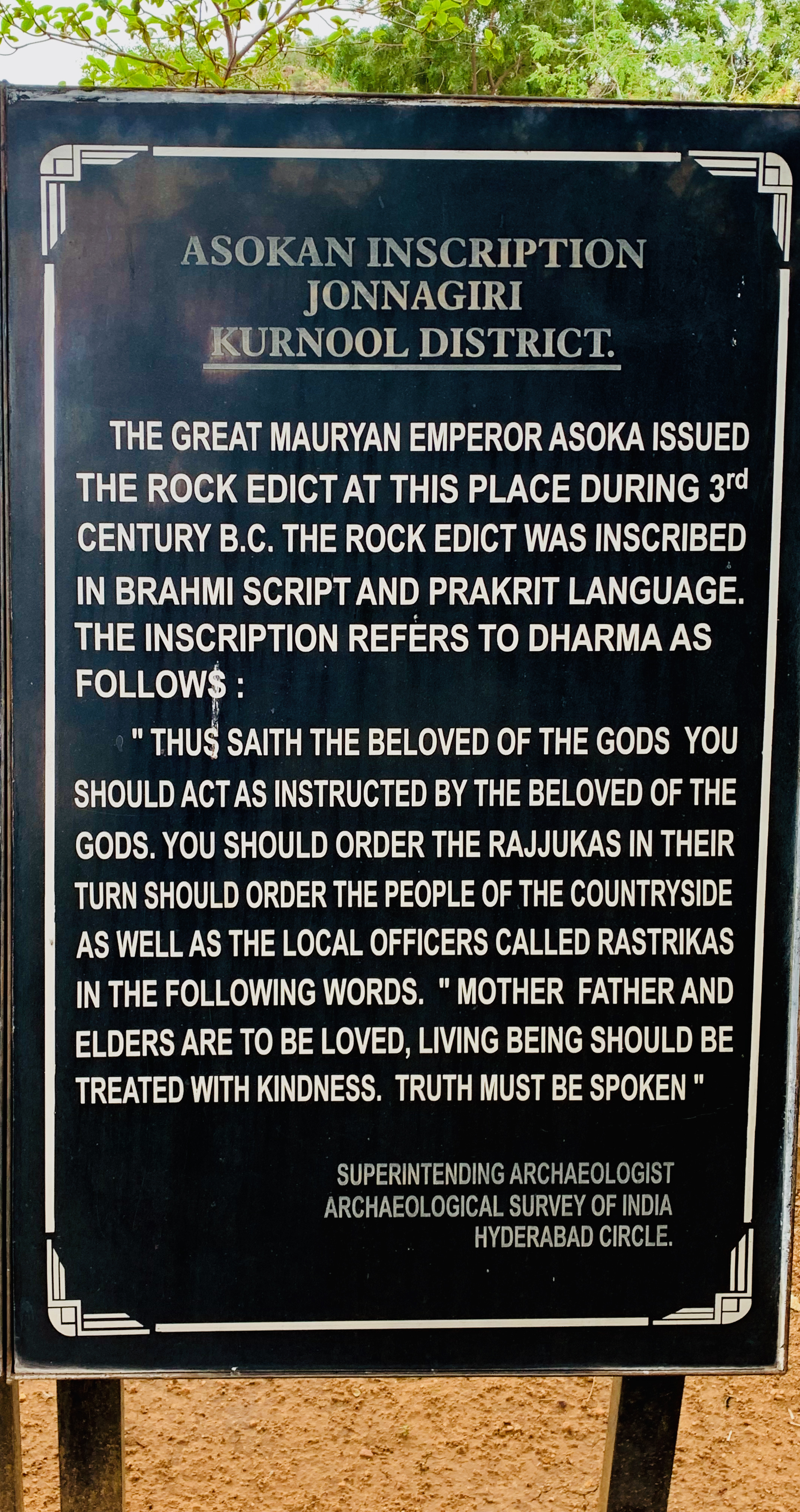
Asoka Inscription ASI Board

The Ketavaram rock paintings are dated back to the Paleolithic era (located at a distance of 18 km (11 mi) from Kurnool). Jurreru Valley, Katavani Kunta and Yaganti in the Nandyal district have some important rock arts and paintings in their vicinity, which are dated back to 35,000 to 40,000 years ago.

The earliest rulers of this region were Nandas, as suggested by place names such as Nandavaram, Nandyal, Mahanandi. They were defeated by Mauryas around 323 A.D. After that the region passed into the hands of Satavahanas, Pallavas, Cholas, Rashtrakutas during the course of time till 973 A.D. It was ruled by Velanadu Cholas and Kakatiyas till 1323 A.D. When Muhammad-Bin-Tughlaq defeated Kakatiyas, the region became part of the Mughal empire. The Mughal rule became weak, leading to the formation of Reddy, Vijayanagar and Bahamani kingdoms. Reddy and Vijayanagar kingdoms fought several wars for the control of this region, with Vijayanagara kings succeeding finally.

During the reign of Vijayanagar king Achyuta Deva Raya in 1530 A.D. the fort of Kurnool was built. Parts of this region were ruled by the chiefs of Velugodu, Nandyal, Araveedu and Owk. The Vijayanagar kingdom was defeated in the battle of Tallikota in 1565 A.D. As a result, part of this region was given over to Bijapur sultanate. The region witnessed battles by Qutub Sahis for control. Qutub Sahi empire was annexed by Mughals during the last decade of the 17th century. In 1724 A.D., Nizam-ul-Mulk defeated Mubariz Khan, the governor of Hyderabad and Ibrahim Khan, the Jagirdar of Kurnool and founded the Asaf Jahi dynasty. During the hegemony of the Mughals and the Asaf Jahis, the Nawabs of Kurnool ruled this region as their Jagir. Daud Khan, Ibrahim Khan, Aluf Khan and Himmat Bahadur Khan were the successive rulers. This region came under the sovereignty of Hyder Ali in 1767 following a treaty with Nizam., but it was transferred back to Nizam by the treaty of Srirangapatnam.

=== Modern history ===
Nizam of Hyderabad ceded this region to the British in 1800. Munro was appointed as principal collector over the ceded districts. Munro subjugated over 80 Palegars, instituted revenue collection system through which he secured the finances. This district along with the other Telugu speaking districts of Madras province were separated to form Andhra State in 1953, with Kurnool as its capital.

==== District boundary changes ====
Talukas of Adoni, Alur, Yemmiganur were merged with Kurnool District from Bellary District in 1953. In 1970, Prakasam district was formed carving out Markapuram, Giddalur, Yerragondapalem talukas from the district. In 2022, the district was split to form Nandyal district.

==== Historical demographics ====
Historical population
Year	Pop.	±% p.a.
1901	950,655	—
1911	1,035,333	+0.86%
1921	987,117	−0.48%
1931	1,120,650	+1.28%
1941	1,222,993	+0.88%
1951	1,315,499	+0.73%
1961	1,570,955	+1.79%
1971	1,982,090	+2.35%
1981	2,407,299	+1.96%
1991	2,973,024	+2.13%
2001	3,529,494	+1.73%
2011	4,053,463	+1.39%

According to the 2011 census Kurnool district has a population of 4,053,463, roughly equal to the nation of Liberia or the US state of Oregon. This gives it a ranking of 54th in India (out of a total of 640). The district has a population density of 229 inhabitants per square kilometre (590/sq mi). Its population growth rate over the decade 2001–2011 was 14.65%. The district had a sex ratio of 984 females for every 1000 males, and a literacy rate of 59.97%.

==== Historical economy ====
The gross district domestic product (GDDP) of the district for the FY 2013-14 is ₹34,359 crore (US$3.7 billion) and it contributes 6.5% to the Gross State Domestic Product (GSDP). For the FY 2013–14, the per capita income at current prices was ₹68,197 (US$730). The primary, secondary and tertiary sectors of the district contribute ₹12,035 crore (US$1.3 billion), ₹6,055 crore (US$650 million) and ₹16,269 crore (US$1.7 billion) respectively.

==== Historical education ====
The primary and secondary school education is imparted by government, aided and private schools, under the School Education Department of the state. As per the school information report for the academic year 2015–16, in the undivided district, there are a total of 4,179 schools. They include, 78 government, 2,398 mandal and zilla parishads, 1 residential, 1,355 private, 33 model, 53 Kasturba Gandhi Balika Vidyalaya (KGBV), 140 municipal and 121 other types of schools. The total number of students enrolled in primary, upper primary and high schools of the district are 631,740.

== Geography ==
Kurnool district occupies an area of approximately 7,977 square kilometres (3,080 sq mi). Kurnool is surrounded by districts of Anantapur district, to south, Nandyal district to east and Bellary of Karnataka to the west, Raichur of Karnataka and Jogulamba Gadwal district to the north. The district includes the Srisailam Dam and a part of the Nallamala Hills, the rest of it lying in Prakasam district, Nandyal district, Kadapa district, and Nellore district.

=== Soil ===
The black cotton soils are predominant in Pattikonda and Adoni mandals. Regur soil of superior quality is available in Kurnool and Pattikonda mandals. Paddy, bengal gram, korra (Italian millets), jowar and cotton are grown.

=== Flora and fauna ===
Most of the district does not have much vegetation, due to lack of adequate rainfall.

=== Rivers ===
Krishna, Tungabhadra, Handri, Bhavanasi are the main rivers in the district. These feed into reservoirs like Srisailam, Gajuladinne, Velugodu and canals like K.C. (Kurnool Cuddapah) canal, T.B (Tungabhadra) low level canal, Gajuladinne canal, Telugu Ganga canal and S.R.B.C. canal.

== Demographics ==
Religion in Kurnool district based on the 2011 Census data
Religion	Percent
Hinduism	83.82%
Islam	14.74%
Christianity	0.83%
Other or not stated	0.61%

After bifurcation the district had a population of 22,71,686, of which 764,101 (33.64%) lived in urban areas. Kurnool district has a sex ratio of 990 females per 1000 males. Scheduled Castes and Scheduled Tribes made up 4,15,120 (18.27%) and 30,047 (1.32%) of the population respectively. Hinduism is the majority religion with 83.8% of population, followed by Islam with 14.74% of population.

Languages of Kurnool district based on the 2011 census
1. Telugu (79.4%)
2. Urdu (13.6%)
3. Kannada (4.77%)
4. Others (2.22%)

Based on the 2011 census, 79.39% of the population spoke Telugu, 13.62% Urdu and 4.77% Kannada as their first language.

== Administrative divisions ==
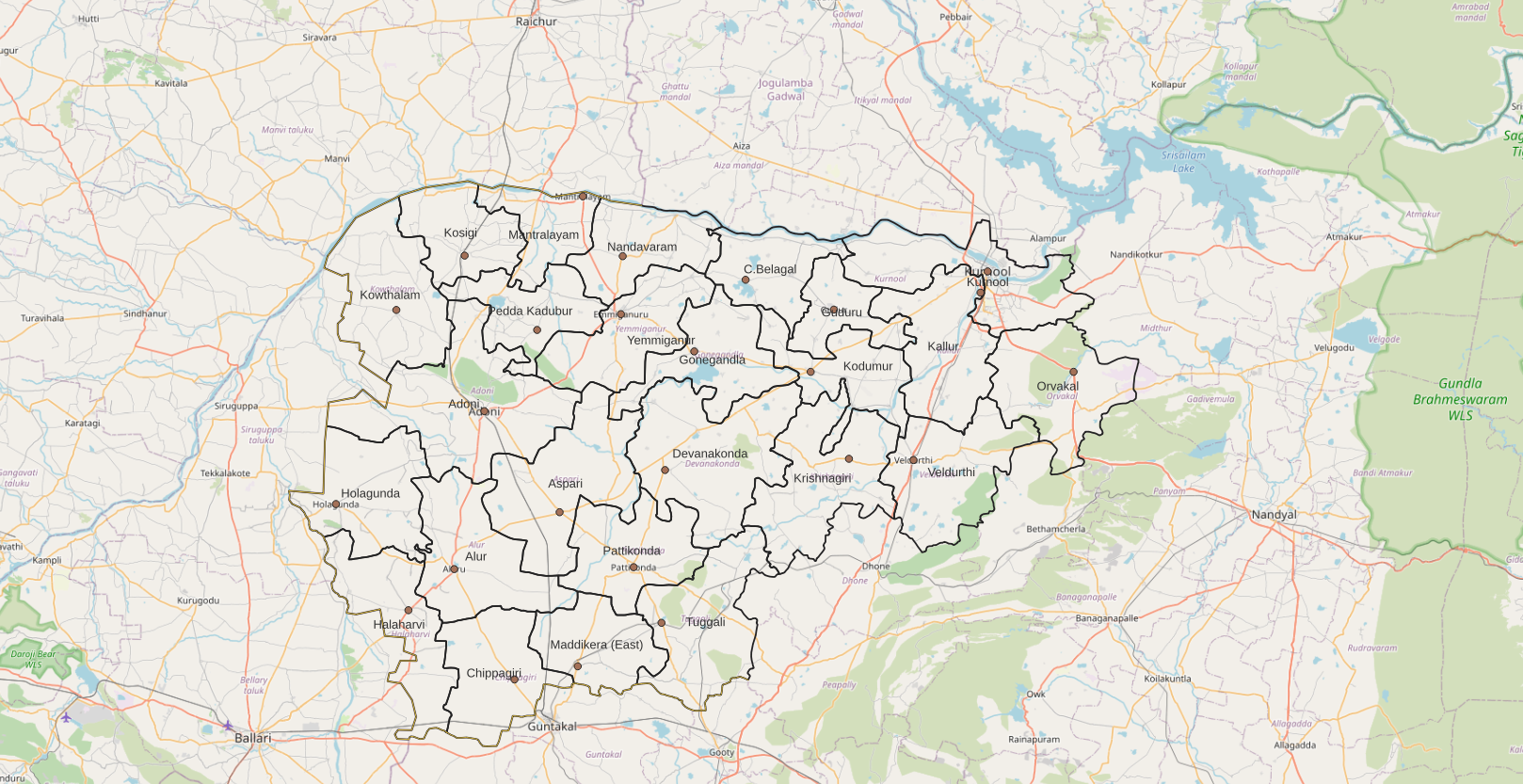
Map of Kurnool district with its mandals

The district is divided into 3 revenue divisions: Adoni, Kurnool and Pattikonda, which are further subdivided into a total of 27 mandals, each headed by a sub-collector.

=== Mandals ===
The list of 27 mandals in Kurnool district, divided into 3 revenue divisions, is given below.

1. Adoni revenue division
  1. Adoni Urban
  2. Adoni Rural
  3. Gonegandla
  4. Holagunda
  5. Kosigi
  6. Kowthalam
  7. Mantralayam
  8. Nandavaram
  9. Pedda kadabur
  10. Yemmiganur
2. Kurnool revenue division
  1. C. Belagal
  2. Gudur
  3. Kallur
  4. Kodumur
  5. Kurnool Rural
  6. Kurnool Urban
  7. Orvakal
  8. Veldurthi
3. Pattikonda revenue division
  1. Alur
  2. Aspari
  3. Chippagiri
  4. Devanakonda
  5. Halaharvi
  6. Krishnagiri
  7. Maddikera East
  8. Pattikonda
  9. Tuggali

== Cities and towns ==
The district has 1 Municipal Corporation 2 Municipalities and 1 Nagar Panchayats as per the district reorganisation in 2022.

Cities and towns in Kurnool District
Ciy/Town	Civil status	Revenue Division	Population (2011)
Kurnool	Municipal Corporation	Kurnool	484,327
Adoni	Municipality Special grade	Adoni	184,625
Yemmiganur	Municipality Grade - 1	Adoni	95,149
Gudur	Nagar Panchayat	Kurnool	22,270

== Villages ==
- Ankireddy Pally
- Hebbatam
- Karimaddela
- Kundhanagurthy
- Mittakandala
- Pesaravai
- Peravali

== Politics ==
There are two parliamentary and eight assembly constituencies in the district. The parliamentary constituencies are Kurnool and Nandyal(partial).

The assembly constituencies are given below.

Constituency number	Name	Reserved for (SC/ST/None)	Parliamentary constituency
137	Kurnool	None	Kurnool
143	Kodumur	SC	Kurnool
144	Yemmiganur	None	Kurnool
145	Mantralayam	None	Kurnool
146	Adoni	None	Kurnool
147	Alur	None	Kurnool
142	Pattikonda	None	Kurnool

== Economy ==
Groundnut oil, granites, and handloom goods are produced in the district.

== Transport ==
=== Roads ===
NH - 44, NH - 40, NH - 167 and NH - 340C national highways pass through the district. Dhone to Somayajulapalli highway has been categorized as NH - 340B in 2021.

=== Railways ===
Vijayawada–Hubli, Secunderabad–Bengaluru, and Chennai–Mumbai railway lines pass through the district. Kurnool and Adoni are major railway stations. These are part of Hyderabad, Guntakal divisions respectively of South Central Railway

=== Airways ===
Uyyalawada Narasimha Reddy Airport is the domestic airport near Kurnool serving the district, which started operations in 2021. Nearest International Airports from Kurnool is Rajiv Gandhi International Airport, Hyderabad at a distance of 195 km.

== Education ==
Rayalaseema University with Kurnool as its headquarters was established in 2008. An engineering college as part of the university was started in 2019. Kurnool medical college was started in 1956. Indian Institute of Information Technology, Design & Manufacturing, Kurnool (IIITDMK) fully funded by Ministry of Education commenced academic activities from 2015, as per the provisions of Andhra Pradesh Reorganisation act of 2014. This was accorded the status of Institute of National Importance in 2017.

== Tourism ==
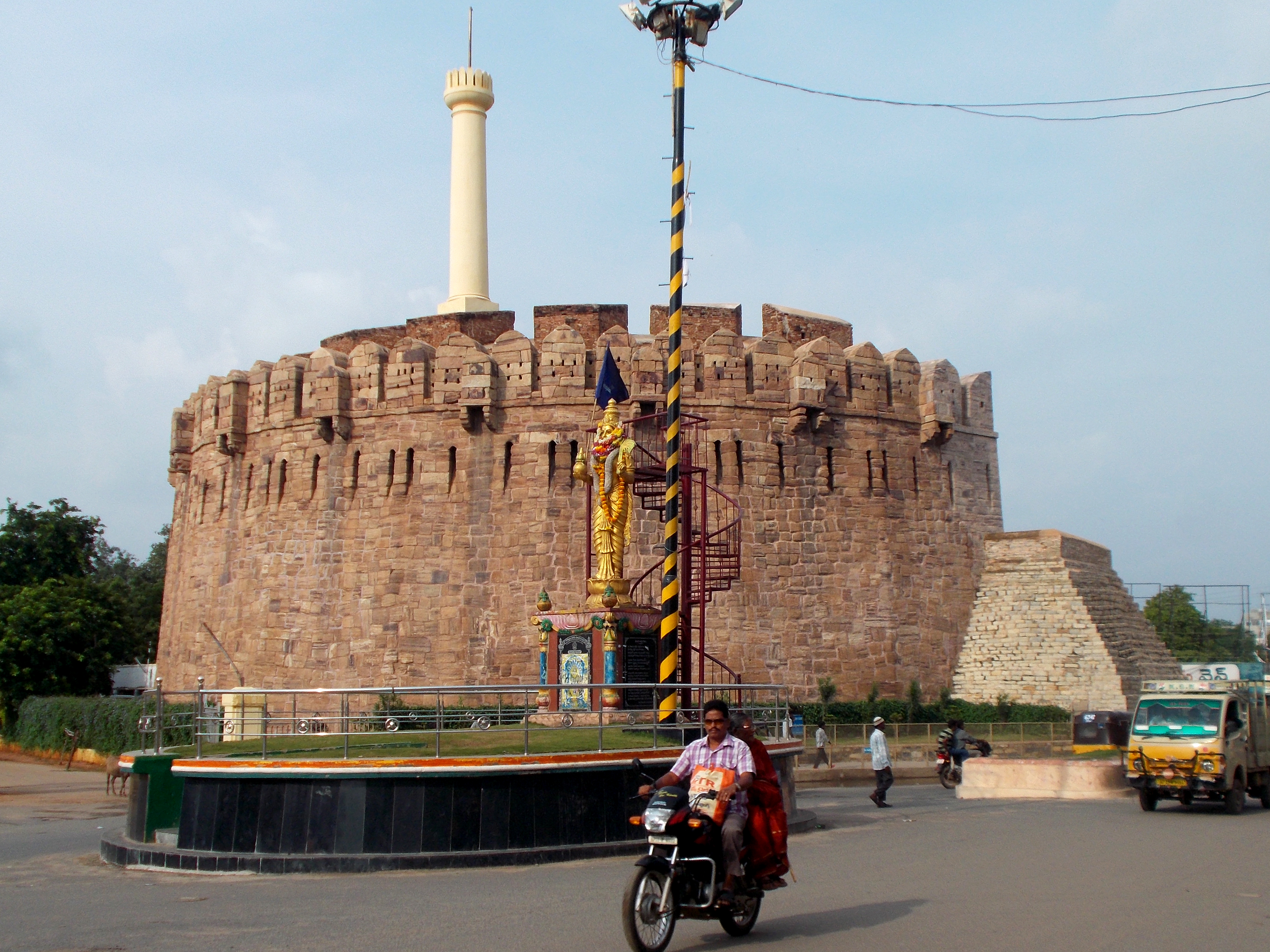
Konda Reddy Fort

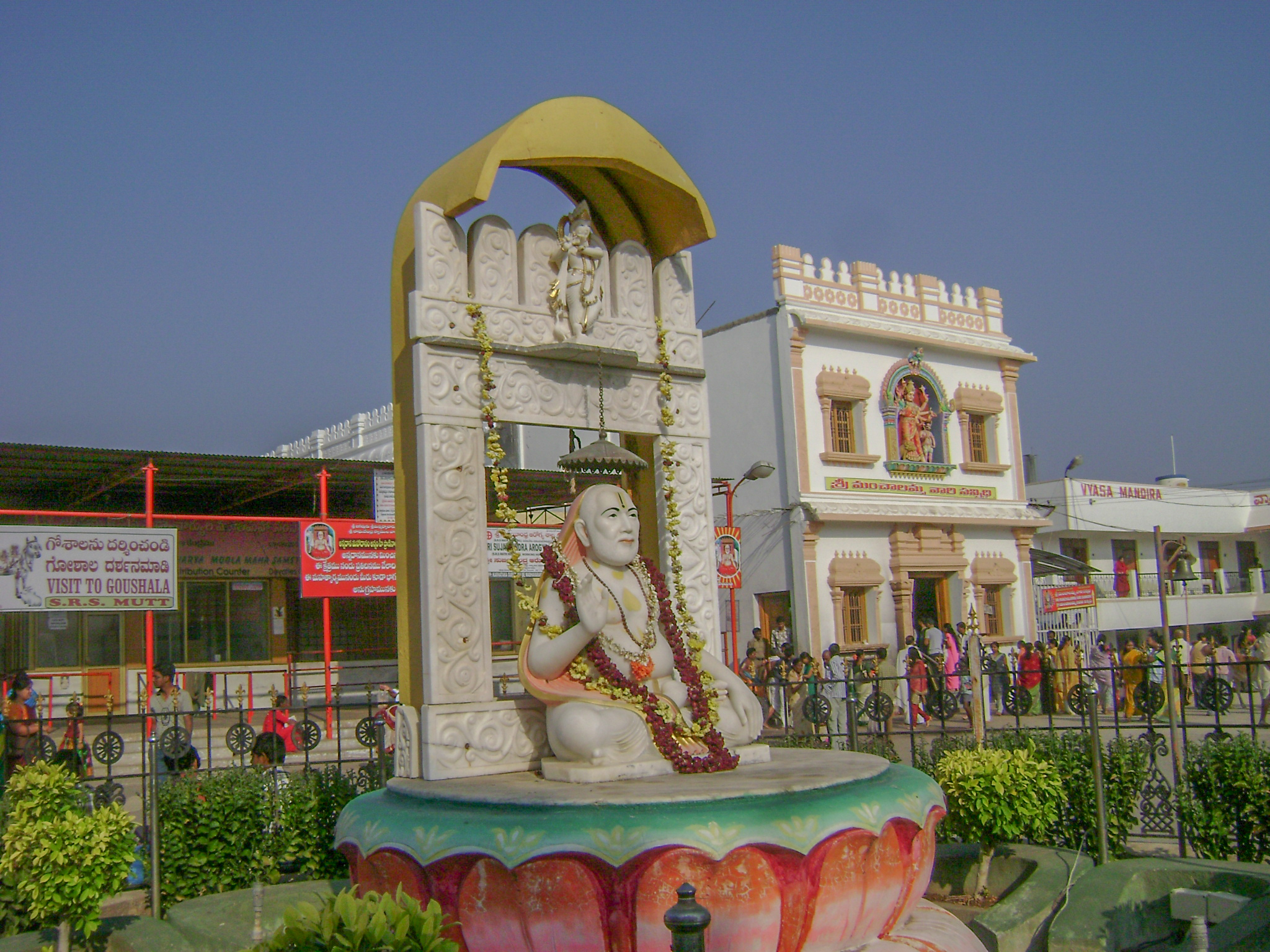
Raghavendra Math Brundavanam at Mantralayam

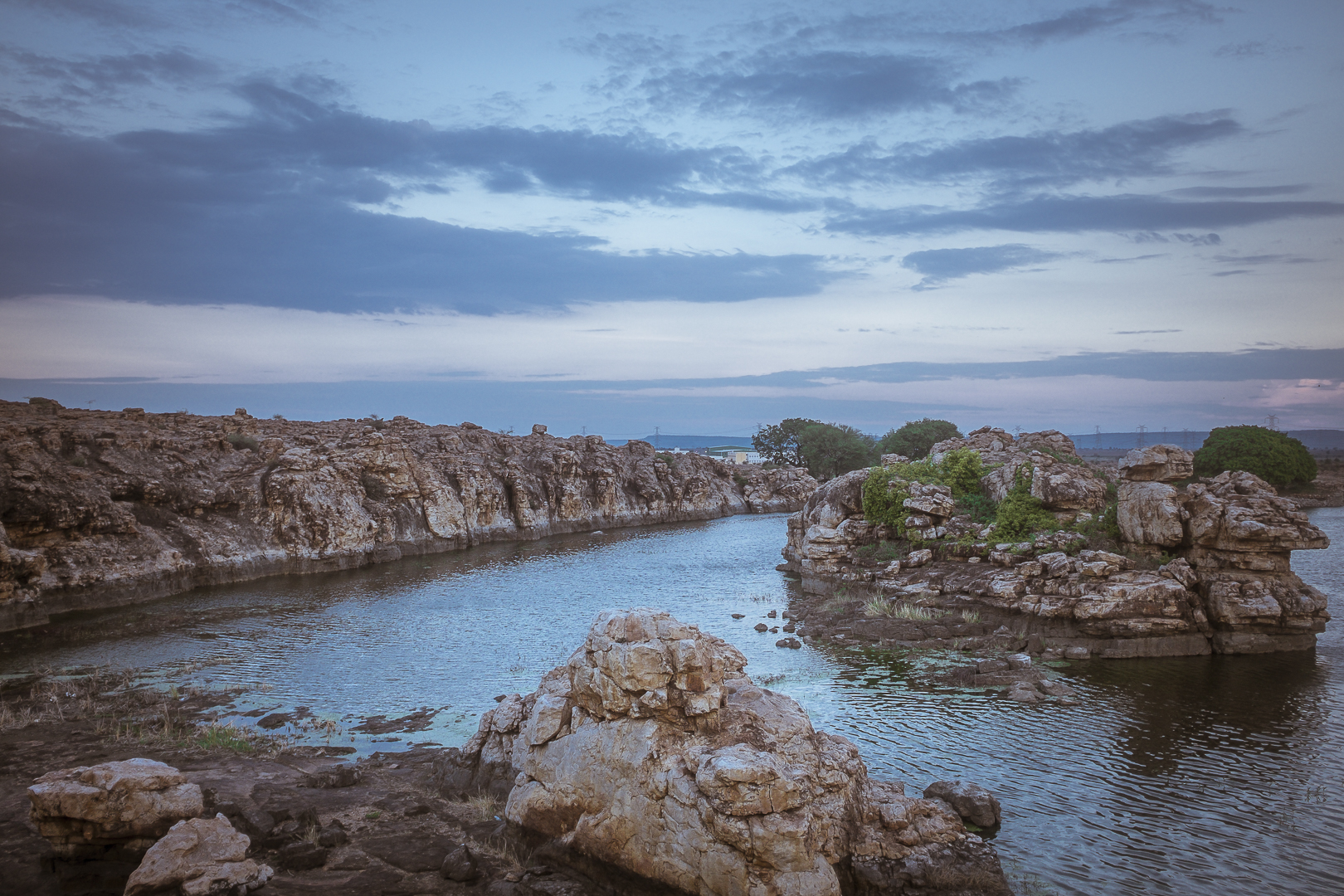
Rock garden at Kurnool

Achyutaraya who succeeded Krishnadevaraya built the initial Konda Reddy Fort between 1530 and 1542. The fort has different gateways and bastions. The fort is named after Konda Reddy, the last ruler of Alampur who was imprisoned in the fort by the Kurnool Nawab in the 17th century. Mantralayam on the banks of the Tungabhadra River is famous for the devotees of Raghavendra Swamy, a saint who lived in the 17th century.

Orvakal rock garden, at about 25 km from Kurnool is a natural landscape of regal rock formations. Sanjeevaiah Sagar also known as The Gajuladinne Project is a dam on the Handri river situated about 20 km from Yemmiganur.

Many attractions in adjacent Nandyal district such as Belum caves, Srisailam, Yaganti can be explored with Kurnool as base.

== Notable people ==
Uyyalawada Narasimha Reddy fought against British East India company rule in India in 1847. Damodaram Sanjivayya served as the first Dalit Chief Minister of united Andhra Pradesh. He also served as central minister later. Kotla Vijaya Bhaskara Reddy represented several assembly constituencies of the undivided district during his political career. He rose to the position of Chief Minister of Andhra Pradesh and also became central minister. P. S. Ramakrishna Rao directed and produced several Telugu films.
