= List of airports in Andhra Pradesh =

Airports in Andhra Pradesh

Andhra Pradesh, a state on east coast of southern India, has airports which have access to both international and domestic flights. Airports Authority of India operates 4 functional Airports in the state while Andhra Pradesh Airports Development Corporation Limited and GVIAL operate 1 each.

Andhra Pradesh Airports provides services to tourists and the state population commuting to different parts of the state. Tirupati International Airport is an international airport that serves the city, which receives a large pilgrim population. Alluri Sitarama Raju International Airport and Vijayawada International Airport are international airports with scheduled international services. Other airports in the state with domestic flights are located at Rajamahendravaram, Kurnool and Kadapa. Sri Sathya Sai Airport and INS Dega are open for chartered flights.

== Classification ==
This list contains the following information:

1. Area served – Town or city where the airport is located. This may not always be an exact location as some airports are situated in the periphery of the town/city they serve.
2. IATA – The three letter airport code assigned by the International Air Transport Association
3. ICAO – The four letter airport code assigned by the International Civil Aviation Organization. ICAO codes for Andhra Pradesh start with VO [South Zone - Chennai Center].
4. Owned/operated – Authority owning or operating the airport
5. Airport type – Type of airport, including the terminology used by Airports Authority of India, as per the table below:

Airport type	Description
International	Airport which handles both international and domestic traffic
International (CE)	A civil enclave airport primarily used by Indian Armed Forces but has separate commercial terminal(s) to handle international and domestic traffic
Customs	Airport with customs checking and clearance facility and handles domestic traffic throughout the year. A very limited number of international flights also operate from some of these customs airports for a limited period of time.
Domestic	Airport which handles only domestic traffic
Domestic (CE)	A civil enclave airport primarily used by Indian Armed Forces but has separate commercial terminal(s) to handle domestic traffic
Defence	An airfield under the control of Indian Armed Forces. The ones listed here include Air Force stations, Naval air stations & Air Force training facilities.
Airstrip	A strip of ground set aside for the take-off and landing of aircraft
Private	An airport, airfield or airstrip owned by individuals, trusts and corporations and for private use only
Flying school	An airfield or an airstrip used to train commercial pilots

Functional status of the airport, as per the table below:

Functional status	Description
Operational	Implies airport has active commercial service for public use airports
Non-operational	Implies airport currently has no active commercial service but had or will have commercial service
Closed	Implies airport can no longer be operational for commercial service
Proposed/under construction	Implies airport is proposed or under construction

== List ==
List of airports in Andhra Pradesh
Area served	Location	Name	IATA	ICAO	Type	Functional status	Owned/operated
Amaravati	Amaravati	Amaravati International Airport	—	—	International	Proposed	APADCL
Kadapa	Kadapa	Kadapa Airport	CDP	VOCP	Domestic	Operational	AAI
Kurnool	Orvakal	Uyyalawada Narasimha Reddy Airport	KJB	VOKU	Domestic	Operational	APADCL
Nellore	Dagadarthi	Nellore Airport	—	—	Domestic	Proposed	APADCL
Palnadu	Macherla	Nagarjuna Sagar Airport	—	VONS	Flying school	Non-operational	AAI
Prakasam	Donakonda	Donakonda Airport	—	VODK	Airstrip	Non-operational	AAI
Puttaparthi	Puttaparthi	Sri Sathya Sai Airport	PUT	VOPN	Private	Operational	SSSCT
Rajamahendravaram	Madhurapudi	Rajahmundry Airport	RJA	VORY	Domestic	Operational	AAI
Tirupati	Renigunta	Tirupati Airport	TIR	VOTP	International	Operational	AAI
Vijayawada	Gannavaram	Vijayawada International Airport	VGA	VOBZ	International	Operational	AAI
Visakhapatnam	Bhogapuram	Alluri Sitarama Raju International Airport	VTZ	VOVI	International	Operational	APADCL/GVIAL
Visakhapatnam	Gopalapatnam	INS Dega	—	VOVZ	Defence	Operational	Indian Navy

== See also ==
- Andhra Pradesh Airports Development Corporation Limited
- List of airports in India
- List of Indian Air Force stations
