= Transport in Andhra Pradesh =

Andhra Pradesh has an extensive and diverse transport network. With a 974 km (605 mi) coastline, the state has one major port at Visakhapatnam and 15 notified ports. Its ports handled about 199.23 million tonnes of cargo in 2023–24. The state also has 888 km (552 mi) of inland waterways, including a section of National Waterway 4. There are three international airports at Visakhapatnam, Vijayawada, and Tirupati, along with domestic airports at Rajahmundry, Kadapa, and Kurnool, and a private airport at Puttaparthi. The state handled about 2.47 million domestic air passengers in 2021–22.

Andhra Pradesh has about 3,969 km (2,466 mi) of railway network operated by the Indian Railways. A section of the Howrah–Chennai main line runs through the state. The South Coast Railway zone is headquartered in Visakhapatnam, and became operational in June 2026. Vijayawada is one of busiest railway stations in India. The state has about 123,334 km (76,636 mi) of roads, including national highways, state highways, district roads, and local roads. The government-run Andhra Pradesh State Road Transport Corporation is the major public transport operator, carrying approximately 3.68 million passengers daily. As of 2023, the state had about 1.83 million transport vehicles and 13.7 million non-transport vehicles.

== Road ==
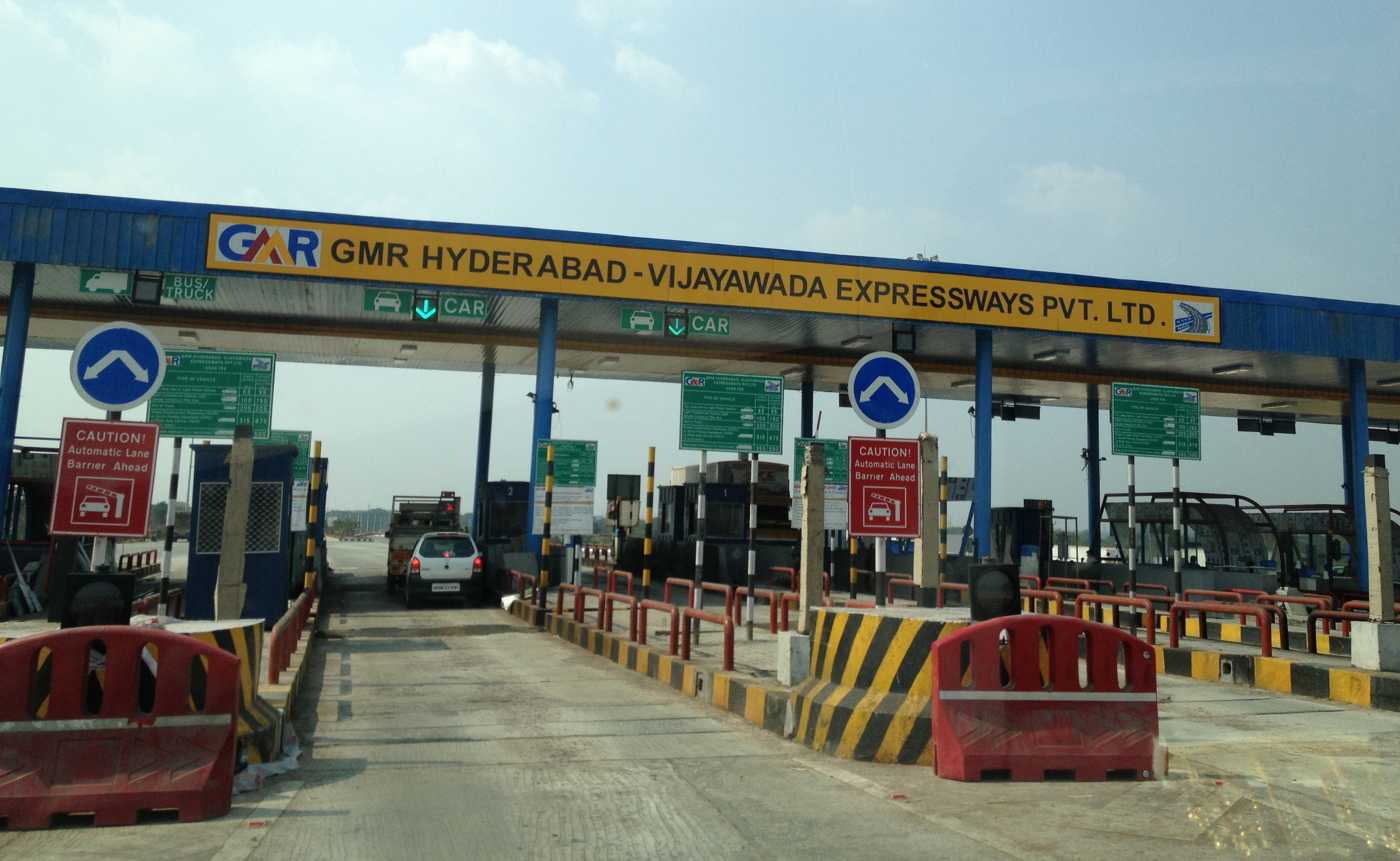
A toll gate on National Highway 65

The road network in the state is maintained by the Andhra Pradesh Road Development Corporation, which was established in 1988, functioning under the Roads and Buildings Department of the state government. The state has a road network of 123,334 km (76,636 mi), including 4,302 km (2,673 mi) of national highways, 7,255 km (4,508 mi) of state highways, 19,783 km (12,293 mi) of major district roads, and 91,994 km (57,162 mi) of other roads. Other type of roads include 21,740.90 km (13,509.17 mi) in urban local bodies with 19,118.97 km (11,879.98 mi) of municipal roads.

NH 16 is the longest national highway in the state stretching for 1,024 km (636 mi) from Srikakulam district to Nellore district along the eastern coast. It forms a part of the Golden Quadrilateral network and AH 45 of the Asian Highway Network. Some of the highways have been developed as expressways including Vijayawada–Hyderabad Expressway, NAM Expressway, and Surat–Chennai Expressway.

=== Bus ===
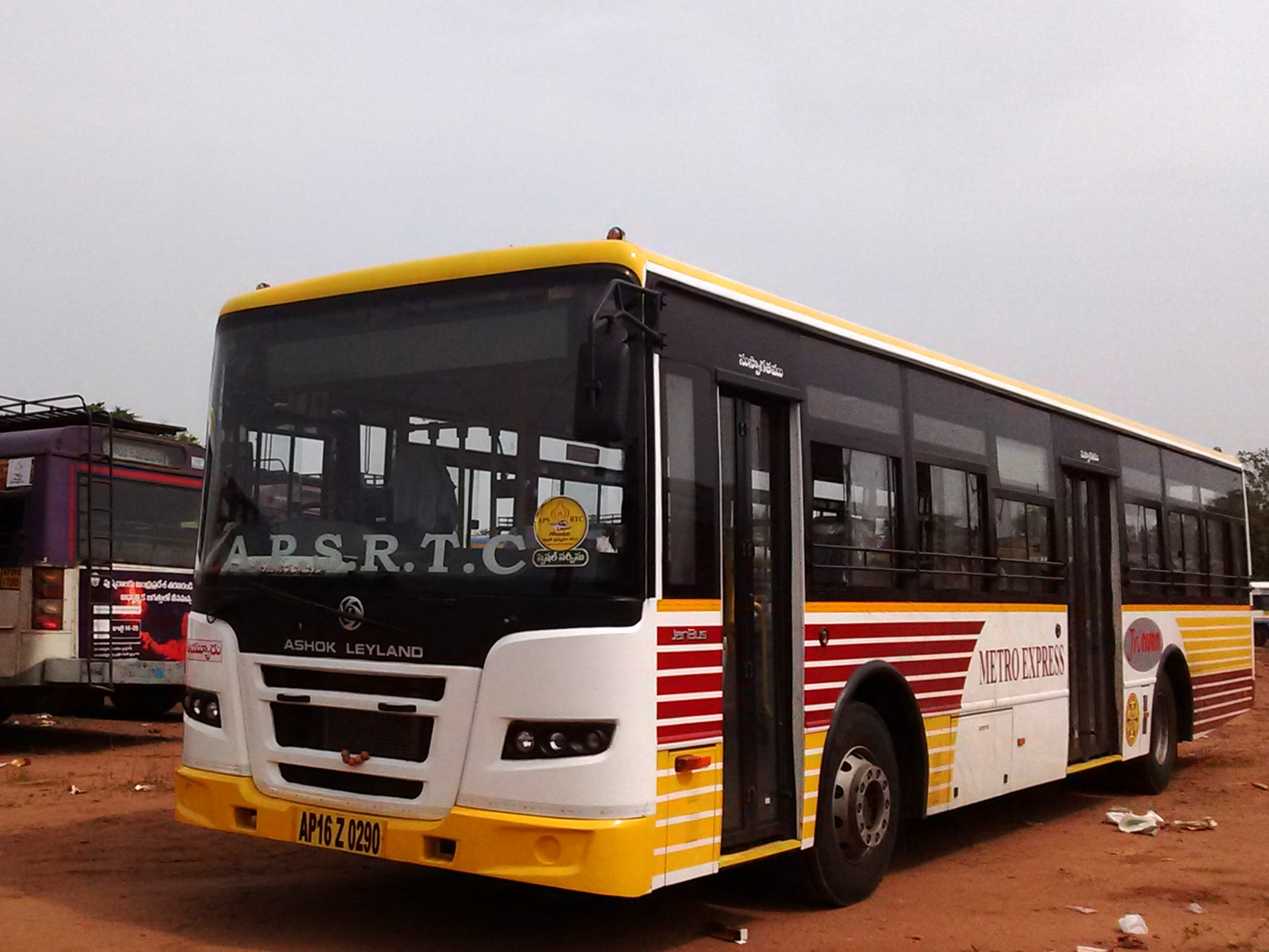
An intracity bus operated by the Andhra Pradesh State Road Transport Corporation

The state government-owned Andhra Pradesh State Road Transport Corporation provides public bus services. As of 2023, it operates a fleet of 11,098 buses across 129 depots, ferrying 3.68 million passengers daily. The APSRTC is headquartered at the RTC House in Pandit Nehru bus station, Vijayawada. Apart from government run APSRTC, private buses also operate in specific routes across the state. Apart from ferrying passengers, APSRTC also transports luggage, parcels, and goods in buses.

=== Vehicles ===
As of 2023, the state had 1.83 million transport vehicles, of which goods carriers constituted 53.6%, and auto rickshaws 36.2%. There were 13.7 million non-transport vehicles, of which motorcycles constituted 89.5%, and four-wheelers constituted 7.3%. Auto rickshaws are used for intra city commute, and "She Autos", driven by women, were introduced in 2017. The transport of goods in the state depends mainly on lorries, mini trucks and auto rickshaws.

== Rail ==
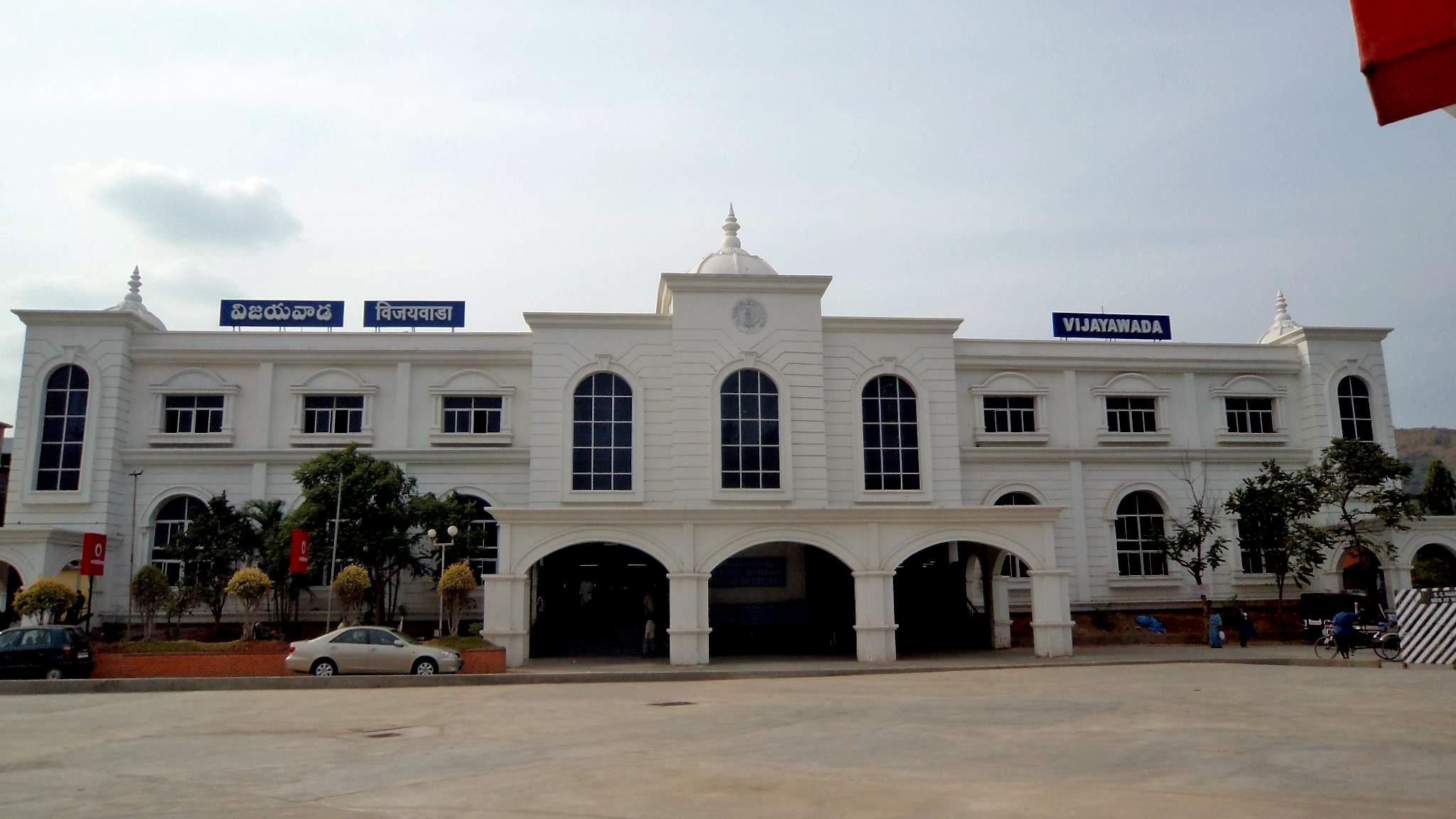
Vijayawada Junction is one of the busiest railheads in the region

The history of rail transport in the state dates back to 1843 when a short railway line was constructed along the beach in Visakhapatnam. In 1845, a railway line was established for ferrying and construction materials for building a dam near Rajahmundry. The Madras Railway established a rail connection from Madras to Renigunta in September 1862. The Rajahmundry–Visakhapatnam line was established in 1893 and the link between Madras and Vijayawada was established in 1899, thereby completing the Howrah-Chennai main line. The Howrah–Chennai main line, which runs through the state, is proposed to be upgraded into a high-speed rail corridor through the Diamond Quadrilateral project of the Indian Railways.

Andhra Pradesh has a railway route network of 3,703.25 km (2,301.09 mi) in 2016, which had been extended to 3,969 km (2,466 mi) by 2022. The railway network forms part of the South Central railway, East Coast railway, South Western railway, and Southern Railway zones. South Coast Railway zone, with headquarters in Visakhapatnam, was announced in 2019, and came to effect on 1 June 2026. There are 180+ railway stations in the state, including three A1 category stations. Vijayawada is one of the busiest rail junctions in the country. Visakhapatnam was declared the cleanest railway station in the country, as per an assessment in 2018. Shimiliguda is one of the highest altitude broad-gauge stations in the country.

== Air ==
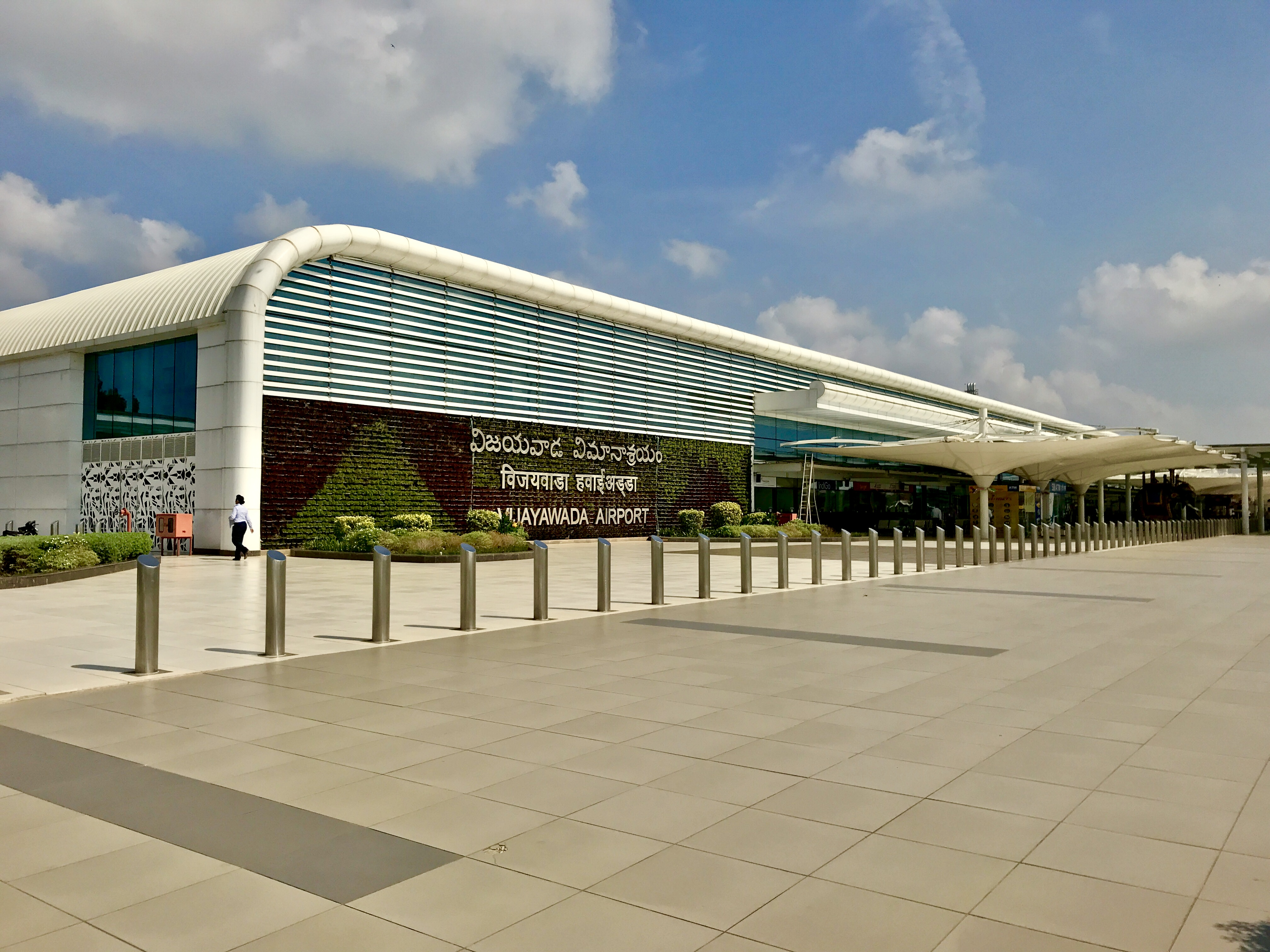
Vijayawada Airport

The state has three international airports. Tirupati and Visakhapatnam Airports were established in 1976, and Vijayawada Airport began operations in 2003. The Visakhapatnam Airport functioned as a civil enclave alongside the airbase INS Dega, operated by the Indian Navy, from 1986 to August 2026, when it was replaced by Alluri Sitarama Raju International Airport. The state has three domestic airports at Rajahmundry, Kadapa, and Kurnool, and a privately owned airport at Puttaparthi. In 2021-22, the state catered to a domestic air passenger traffic of 2.47 million. In 2014, the state government announced plans to set up an airport in every district of the state including a new international airport in Amaravati.

== Water ==
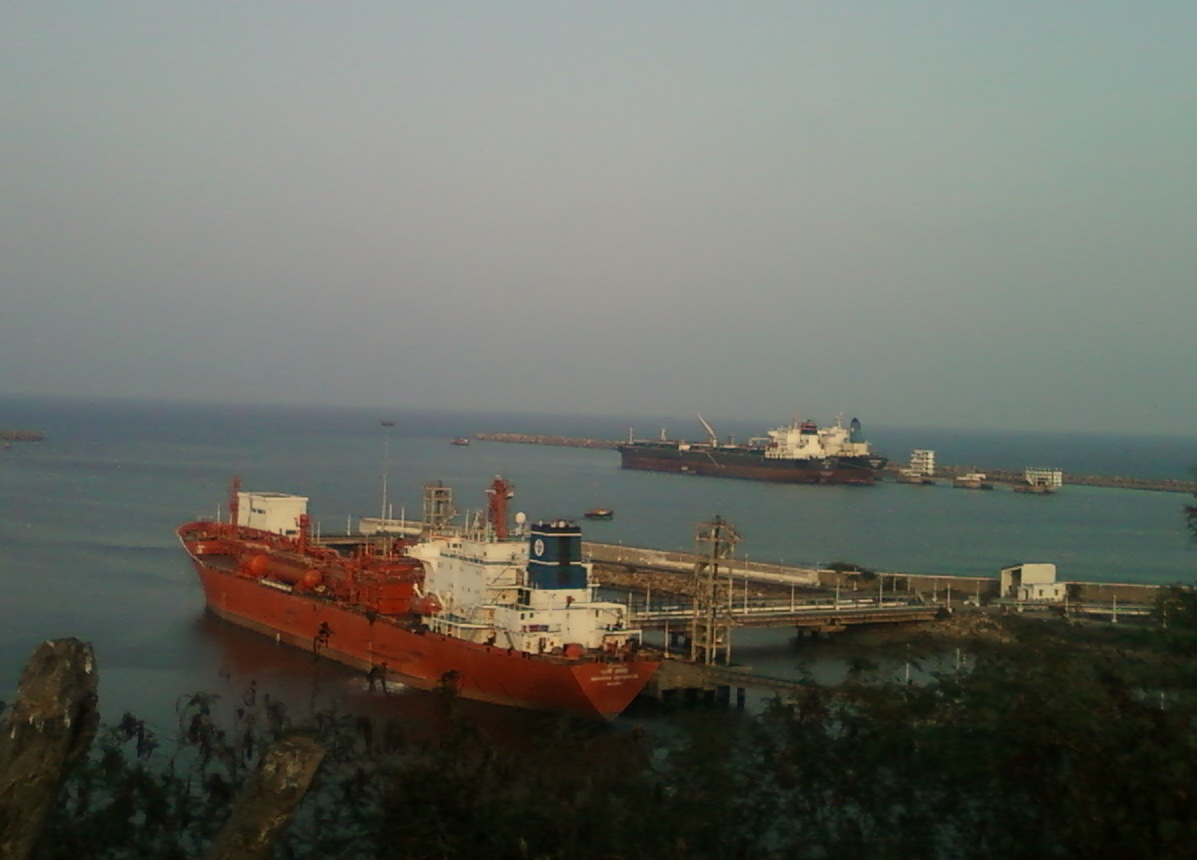
Visakhapatnam Port

The state has a 974 km (605 mi) long coastline. The state has one major port at Visakhapatnam under the administrative control of the central government and 15 notified ports under the control of the state government. Apart from Visakhapatnam, which is one of the major ports on the east coast of India, other deep water ports include Gangavaram, and Krishnapatnam. The states' ports handled 199.23 Mt (196,080,000 long tons; 219,610,000 short tons) of cargo in 2023-24. As of 2023, the state government is developing new sea ports at Machilipatnam, Mulapeta, and Ramayapatnam.

About 888 km (552 mi) of inland waterways exist in the state, which form part of the National Waterway network. In 2017, the Inland Waterways Authority of India announced the development of the 1,080 km (670 mi) long National Waterway 4 from Kakinada to Puducherry via Vijayawada.
