= Kuppam Airport =

- IATA: none; ICAO: none

Summary
- Owner: Andhra Pradesh Airports Development Corporation Limited
- Location: Kuppam
- Interactive map of Kuppam Airport

Kuppam Airport is a proposed greenfield airport located in Kuppam, Andhra Pradesh, India. It received permission from BIAL to operate by taking 15% of commission. The airport is being planned to be built in two phases. The airport project is targeted for completion by 2027.

== History ==
=== Planning and development ===
In March 2026, the Government of Andhra Pradesh has initiated land-acquisition of about 150 acres for the airport. The area acquired includes land in villages in Santhipuram and Ramakuppam mandals. The Government of Andhra Pradesh has sought site-clearance for this airport from Ministry of Civil Aviation.

In July DPR approval was sent for finance appraisal.

The airport is planned to be developed in PPP model with support from HUDCO.

In October 2026, the central government granted site clearance.

== See also ==
- Alluri Sitarama Raju International Airport
- Amaravati International Airport
- Vijayawada International Airport
