= Air Costa =

Indian regional airline

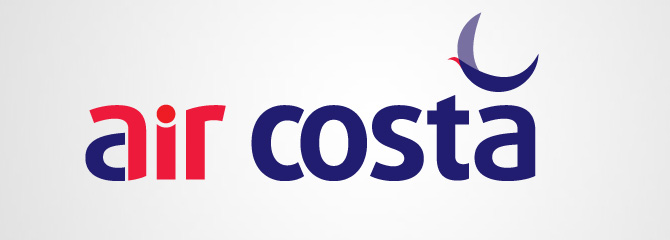
IATA	ICAO	Call sign
LB	LEP	LECOSTA
- Commenced operations: 15 October 2013; 12 years ago
- Ceased operations: 28 February 2017; 9 years ago
- Operating bases: Chennai International Airport
- Fleet size: 0
- Destinations: 0
- Parent company: LEPL Group
- Headquarters: Vijayawada, Andhra Pradesh, India
- Key people: Ramesh Lingamaneni Chairman; LVS Rajasekhar MD; Vivek Choudhary CEO
- Employees: 800
- Website: aircosta.in (now defunct)

Air Costa was an Indian regional airline headquartered in Vijayawada and based out of Chennai International Airport. It was owned by Indian business company LEPL Group. The airline commenced operations as a regional airline in October 2013 using two Embraer E-170 aircraft, with the first flight taking off from Chennai on 16 October 2013. The airline received a permit for pan-India operations in October 2016. The airline focused on connectivity between tier II and tier III cities in the country, and invested ₹600 crore (US$62 million) as of 2015. Air Costa operated 32 daily flights to nine destinations from its focus cities Chennai and Vijayawada as of 2015. The airline had a maintenance center in Chennai. On 28 February 2017, it suspended operations until further notice.

== History ==
Air Costa was owned by Indian business company LEPL Group. The airline received a No-Objection Certificate (NOC) from the Ministry of Civil Aviation in February 2012. The airline initially planned to start operations with a fleet of Q400 aircraft but later announced its decision to acquire Embraer Jets at the Paris Air Show in June 2013. Air Costa received its Air Operators' Permit (AOP) from the Directorate General of Civil Aviation (DGCA) in September 2013.

The airline commenced operations as a regional airline in October 2013 using two Embraer E-170 aircraft with the first flight taking off from its hub at Chennai on 16 October 2013. The airline focused on connectivity between tier II and tier III cities in the country and has invested ₹600 crore (US$62 million) as of 2015.

Air Costa ordered 50 Embraer E-Jets E2 aircraft worth US$2.94 billion during the Singapore Airshow on 13 February 2014. Embraer has cancelled the order. The airline would have become the Asian launch customer for the type if it would have taken the first delivery in 2018 as planned.

In September 2015, Air Costa, which held a regional airline's license, applied to the aviation regulator DGCA for its license to be upgraded to that of a national airline. Air Costa received a no-objection certificate from the civil aviation ministry for pan-India operations on 19 December 2015. Two Embraer E-190s were added by September 2015. Air Costa added one more E-190 in December 2015 and had plans to add three to five E-190 aircraft in its fleet in 2016. The airline had a 0.8% market share in the Indian domestic airline market as of February 2016.

On 28 February 2017, Air Costa suspended operations until further notice stating financial difficulties regarding the lease of aircraft. GECAS seized two of the airline's leased aircraft, while a third had already been returned to the lessor.

== Destinations ==
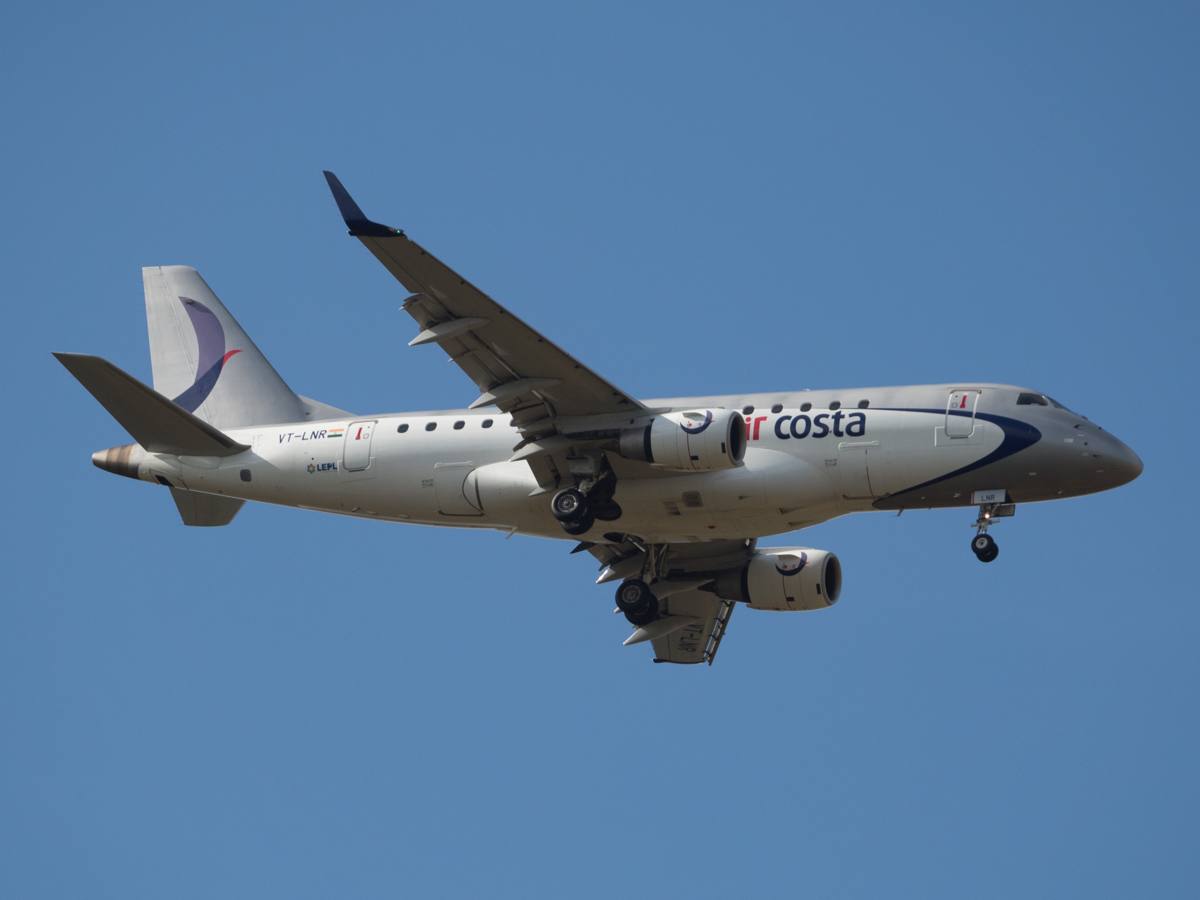
A former Air Costa Embraer 170

Air Costa was flying to the following destinations in India at the time it suspended operations:

State	City	Airport	Notes
Andhra Pradesh	Tirupati	Tirupati Airport	Terminated
Andhra Pradesh	Vijayawada	Vijayawada Airport	Hub
Andhra Pradesh	Visakhapatnam	Visakhapatnam Airport	Terminated
Gujarat	Ahmedabad	Sardar Vallabhbhai Patel International Airport	Terminated
Karnataka	Bangalore	Kempegowda International Airport	Terminated
Rajasthan	Jaipur	Jaipur International Airport	Terminated
Tamil Nadu	Chennai	Chennai International Airport	Terminated
Tamil Nadu	Coimbatore	Coimbatore International Airport	Terminated
Telangana	Hyderabad	Rajiv Gandhi International Airport	Terminated

== Fleet ==
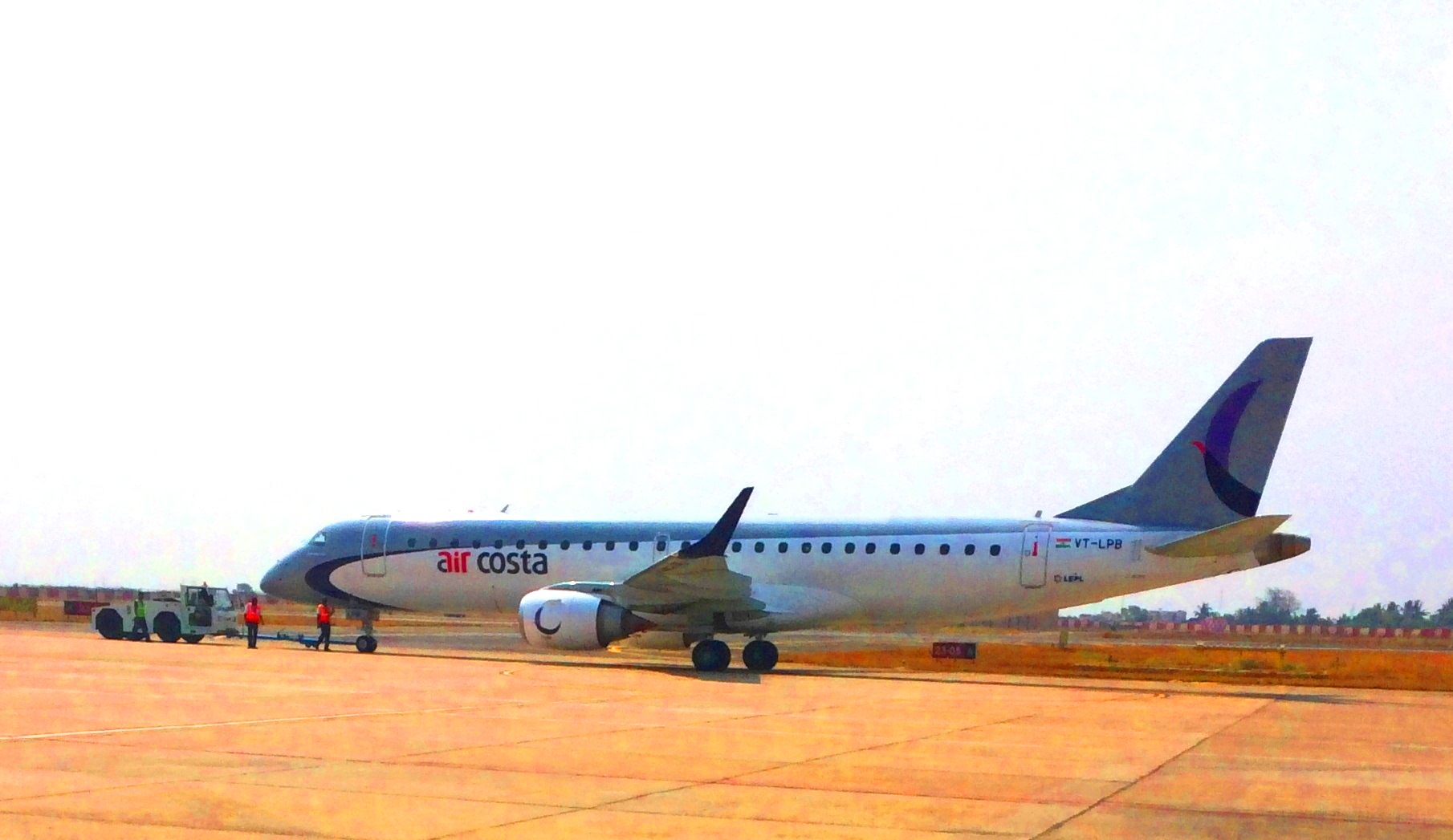
Air Costa Embraer 190

Prior to suspending operations in February 2017, the Air Costa fleet consisted of the following aircraft:

Air Costa fleet
Aircraft	In service	Orders	Passengers			Notes
Aircraft	In service	Orders	J	Y	Total	Notes
Embraer 190	3	1	0	112	112	Order cancelled by GECAS
Embraer 190-E2	—	25	6	92	98	Supposed to be the Asian launch customer
Embraer 195-E2	—	25	12	106	118	Supposed to be the Asian launch customer
Total	0	51				
