= TruJet =

Indian low-cost regional airline (2013–2022)

IATA	ICAO	Call sign
2T	TRJ	TRUJET
- Founded: 14 March 2013; 13 years ago
- Commenced operations: 12 July 2015; 11 years ago
- Ceased operations: 15 February 2022; 4 years ago
- Hubs: Hyderabad
- Secondary hubs: Chennai; Ahmedabad
- Destinations: 12
- Parent company: NS Aviation Pvt. Ltd.
- Headquarters: Hyderabad, Telangana, India
- Key people: Dr Mohammed Ali (Chairman), Mrs Isha Ali (Vice Chairman)

TruJet was an Indian regional airline based at Rajiv Gandhi International Airport in Hyderabad. The airline commenced operations in July 2015 and ceased all operations in February 2022. At its peak, the airline had seven aircraft, and was India's longest serving regional airline.

== History ==
Turbo Megha Airways Private Limited was incorporated on March 14, 2013 with Ram Charan and Vankayalapati Umesh as promoters, with the backing of 20 investors. The company planned to operate ATR aircraft primarily aimed at pilgrims and middle class travellers to destinations like Tirupati. The airline obtained a No Objection Certificate from the Ministry of Civil Aviation on 21 July 2014. In August 2014, the promoters sold a 90 per cent stake in the airline to Hyderabad-based Megha Engineering and Infrastructures Limited (MEIL) in order to fund their operations.

The airline adopted the brand name TruJet in February 2015. TruJet received its air operator's certificate for regional operations from the Directorate General of Civil Aviation on 7 July 2015. The airline commenced operations on 12 July with a flight from its Hyderabad hub to Tirupati. The airline's Air Operators Permit (AOP) was changed to the scheduled commuter operator (SCO) category by the DGCA in May 2017, allowing the carrier to operate flights to other regions of India under the government's UDAN Regional Connectivity Scheme.

By 2018, the airline was operating to 20 destinations with five ATR aircraft and had carried around 1.2 million passengers. TruJet's operated over 300 UDAN flights a week, amounting to about 73 per cent of its total capacity. But by 2019, the airline began seeing cancellations. In 2020 the Covid-19 pandemic brought in further operational difficulties.

From 12 July 2020, five out of seven ATR aircraft operated by TruJet were grounded by lessors due unpaid dues.

On 1 April 2021, Trujet announced that US firm Interups had purchased a 49% stake in the company. In an interview, Laxmi Prasad, the chairman of Interups stated that they planned to expand services across the country as well as overseas, and to entrer into market segments such as cargo, private charters, and helicopter ambulance services. Interups' new investment plan would involve the purchase of narrow body aircraft such as the Airbus A220 and the Embraer E-Series. However, as of July the funds had not been released.

MEIL transferred the airline's ownership to its former owner Vankayalapati Umesh for an undisclosed amount in October 2021. Umesh took over as the Managing Director on October 9 even as most of the board of TruJet resigned.

TruJet recorded an operating loss of Rs 143 crore FY21, while the operating loss stood at Rs 10.1 crore in FY20 and Rs 17.56 crore in FY19. On 15 February 2022, TruJet ceased all operations owing to financial crisis.

Efforts were made to restart the airline with the help of investors. In May 2022, We Indian Nationals Aviation Private Limited (Winair), a company headquartered in Nagpur, announced that it had acquired a 79% stake in Trujet. In June 2023, US-based aviation company NS Aviation announced that it had acquired an 85 per cent stake in the airline and had plans to revive the airline by end of 2023.

In June 2025, the airline was given full-fledged domestic airline status by DGCA upgrading its status from regional airline to full service carrier.

== Destinations ==
TruJet used to operate from the following destinations as of June 2021.

Airport	City	State	Notes	Refs
Kadapa Airport	Kadapa	Andhra Pradesh		
Rajahmundry Airport	Rajahmundry	Andhra Pradesh		
Tirupati Airport	Tirupati	Andhra Pradesh		
Vijayawada Airport	Vijayawada	Andhra Pradesh		
Dabolim Airport	Dabolim	Goa	Terminated	
Sardar Vallabhbhai Patel International Airport	Ahmedabad	Gujarat	Hub	
Kandla Airport	Kandla	Gujarat		
Porbandar Airport	Porbandar	Gujarat		
Belagavi Airport	Belagavi	Karnataka		
Kempegowda International Airport	Bengaluru	Karnataka		
Bidar Airport	Bidar	Karnataka		
Mysore Airport	Mysuru	Karnataka		
Jindal Vijaynagar Airport	Ballari	Karnataka		
Devi Ahilya Bai Holkar Airport	Indore	Madhya Pradesh	Terminated	
Aurangabad Airport	Aurangabad	Maharashtra	Terminated	
Jalgaon Airport	Jalgaon	Maharashtra	Terminated	
Kolhapur Airport	Kolhapur	Maharashtra		
Chhatrapati Shivaji Maharaj International Airport	Mumbai	Maharashtra		
Shri Guru Gobind Singh Ji Airport	Nanded	Maharashtra	Terminated	
Nashik Airport	Nashik	Maharashtra		
Jaisalmer Airport	Jaisalmer	Rajasthan		
Chennai International Airport	Chennai	Tamil Nadu	Hub	
Coimbatore International Airport	Coimbatore	Tamil Nadu	Terminated	
Salem Airport	Salem	Tamil Nadu		
Rajiv Gandhi International Airport	Hyderabad	Telangana	Hub	

== Fleet ==
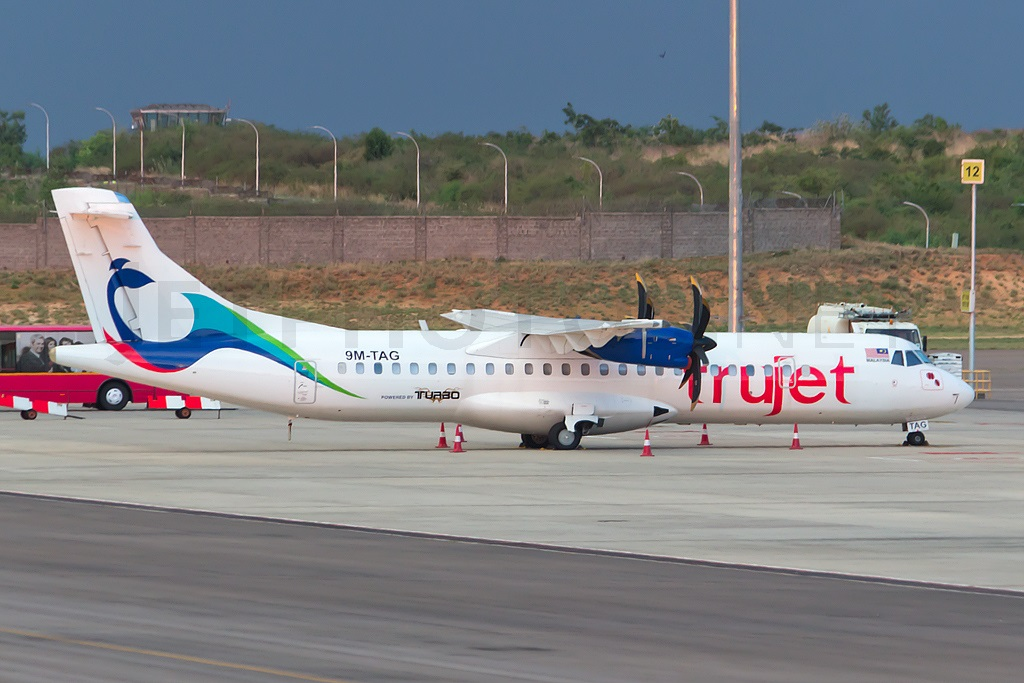
TruJet ATR 72-500

As of July 2022, TruJet operates the following aircraft:

TruJet fleet
Aircraft	In service	Orders	Passengers	Notes
ATR 72-500	0	—	70	
ATR 72-600	0	—	70	
Total	0			
