= Andhra Pradesh Airports Development Corporation Limited =

Indian state government–owned company

Andhra Pradesh Airports Development Corporation Limited (APADCL)
- Type: Public Sector Enterprise under Government of Andhra Pradesh
- Industry: Airport Construction and Maintenance
- Predecessor: Bhogapuram International Airport Corporation Limited (BIACL)
- Founded: 20 May 2015; 11 years ago
- Headquarters: Mangalagiri
- Area served: Andhra Pradesh, India
- Products: Airport management
- Owner: Government of Andhra Pradesh
- Website: www.apadcl.com

Andhra Pradesh Airports Development Corporation Limited (APADCL) is a state-owned enterprise and special purpose vehicle (SPV) established by the Government of Andhra Pradesh to develop, operate, and manage greenfield airports across Andhra Pradesh, India. The corporation is headquartered in Mangalagiri, Andhra Pradesh.

APADCL has received Government of Andhra Pradesh's approval for the development of airports in Amaravati, Dagadarthi, Kuppam and Srikakulam. It prepared proposals to develop nine new airports at a cost of Rs 6,416 crore. A new comprehensive aviation policy, Andhra Pradesh Aviation Policy (APAP-2026), was approved by the state cabinet targeting growth in private investment, air connectivity, MRO facilities and aerospace manufacturing. APADCL will serve as the nodal agency for implementing the policy. It will act as a single-window facilitation agency, coordinating aviation projects in the state through investor support, approvals, and monitoring.

== History ==
APADCL was originally incorporated in 2015 as the Bhogapuram International Airport Corporation Limited (BIACL). It was formed exclusively as a Special Purpose Vehicle (SPV) to accelerate the Bhogapuram International Airport Project near Visakhapatnam. It was restructured and rebranded under its current name in November 2017. This administrative shift expanded the corporation's legal and developmental mandate from a single-project entity into a state-wide civil aviation nodal agency.

== Projects ==
With two operational airports, two projects to upgrade closed airstrips, and four proposed greenfield airports, the APADCL project functional status is summarized in the table below:

Functional status	Description
Operational	Implies airport has active commercial service for public use airports
Non-operational	Implies airport currently has no active commercial service but had or will have commercial service
Proposed/under construction	Implies airport is proposed or under construction

List of all projects
Airport	IATA	ICAO	Type	Functional Status	Notes
Alluri Sitarama Raju International Airport	VTZ	VOVI	International	Operational	Public-Private Partnership (PPP) with GMR Group under a DBFOT framework.
Uyyalawada Narasimha Reddy Airport	KJB	VOKU	Domestic	Operational	
Nagarjuna Sagar Airport		VONS	Flying School	Closed	New airport approved under UDAN 2.0 Scheme.
Donakonda Airport		VODK	Airstrip	Closed.	Awaiting Technical and Economic Feasibility Report (TEFR).
Amaravati Airport			International	Proposed	Technical and Economic Feasibility Report (TEFR) finished.
Dagadarathi Airport			Domestic	Proposed	Land acquisition in progress.
Kuppam Airport			Domestic	Proposed	Technical and Economic Feasibility Report (TEFR) finished.
Srikakulam Airport			Domestic	Proposed	Technical and Economic Feasibility Report (TEFR) finished.

== See also ==
- List of airports in Andhra Pradesh
- Transport in Andhra Pradesh
