= VTZ =

VTZ may refer to:

- Alluri Sitarama Raju International Airport (IATA code VTZ), serving Visakhapatnam, Andhra Pradesh, India
- Visakhapatnam Airport (which previously had the IATA code VTZ)
- Volgograd Tractor Factory (Russian: Volgogradskiy traktornyy zavod)
