= Amaravati International Airport =

Proposed international airport in Amaravati, Andhra Pradesh, India

- IATA: none; ICAO: none

Summary
- Airport type: Public
- Owner: Government of Andhra Pradesh
- Serves: Amaravati
- Location: Tadikonda, Guntur district, Andhra Pradesh, India
- Coordinates: 16°27′54″N 80°25′37″E

Map
- Location of the planned airport in Andhra Pradesh

Amaravati International Airport is a proposed greenfield international airport located in Amaravati, Andhra Pradesh, India. The planned airport is expected to improve air connectivity to Amaravati and support the region’s development.

== History ==
=== Planning and development ===
In 2015, the Government of Andhra Pradesh proposed the construction of a new greenfield airport within the capital region. The initial plan envisaged acquiring approximately 5,000 acres of land for the airport. This requirement was later revised to 7,500 acres, as part of the Amaravati master plan.

Tenders were invited from consultancy firms to prepare a Technical and Economic Feasibility Report (TEFR) for the proposed greenfiled airport. The selected firm would assess the suitability of potential locations, develop financial models, evaluate the project’s environmental impact, and prepare a 35-year conceptual master plan.

The state government also approved a proposal submitted by the Andhra Pradesh Airports Development Corporation Limited to provide a guarantee for obtaining loans totaling ₹1,000 crore. The funds were intended to support, among other works, the development of external infrastructure for the proposed airport.

In 2026, the Government of Andhra Pradesh decided to allocate 4,500 acres of land for the construction of the greenfield airport under the second phase of the Land Pooling Scheme. Phase 1 of the project was estimated to cost approximately ₹4,700 crore and was proposed to be developed through a public–private partnership (PPP) on a design–build–finance–operate–transfer (DBFOT) basis. The PPP model was approved by the state cabinet under the new comprehensive Andhra Pradesh Aviation Policy (APAP-2026).

The Techno-Economic Feasibility Reports (TEFRs) have been finalized and Andhra Pradesh Airports Development Corporation Limited has submitted proposals seeking site clearance from the Ministry of Civil Aviation. It was reported that following approval from the central government, the agencies selected will prepare the Detailed Project Reports (DPRs).

== Project Details ==
Technical specifications for Phase 1 of the airport were outlined in the Request for Quotation (RFQ) document issued by RITES Limited. As the designated consultant, RITES was responsible for preparing the Techno-Economic Feasibility Report (TEFR) for the greenfield airport. The preliminary parameters derived from this report include:

Item	Details
Airport type	Greenfield international airport
Development model	Public–private partnership
Concession model	Design–build–finance–operate–transfer
Estimated cost of Phase I	Approximately ₹4,700 crore
Proposed land area	Approximately 4,500 acres
Feasibility study	Techno-Economic Feasibility Report
Runways	1
Runway length	4,000 m
Taxiways	2
Instrument Landing System	Category 1

== See also ==
- Alluri Sitarama Raju International Airport
- Andhra Pradesh Airports Development Corporation Limited
- Vijayawada International Airport
