= Kadapa Airport =

Airport serving Kadapa, Andhra Pradesh, India

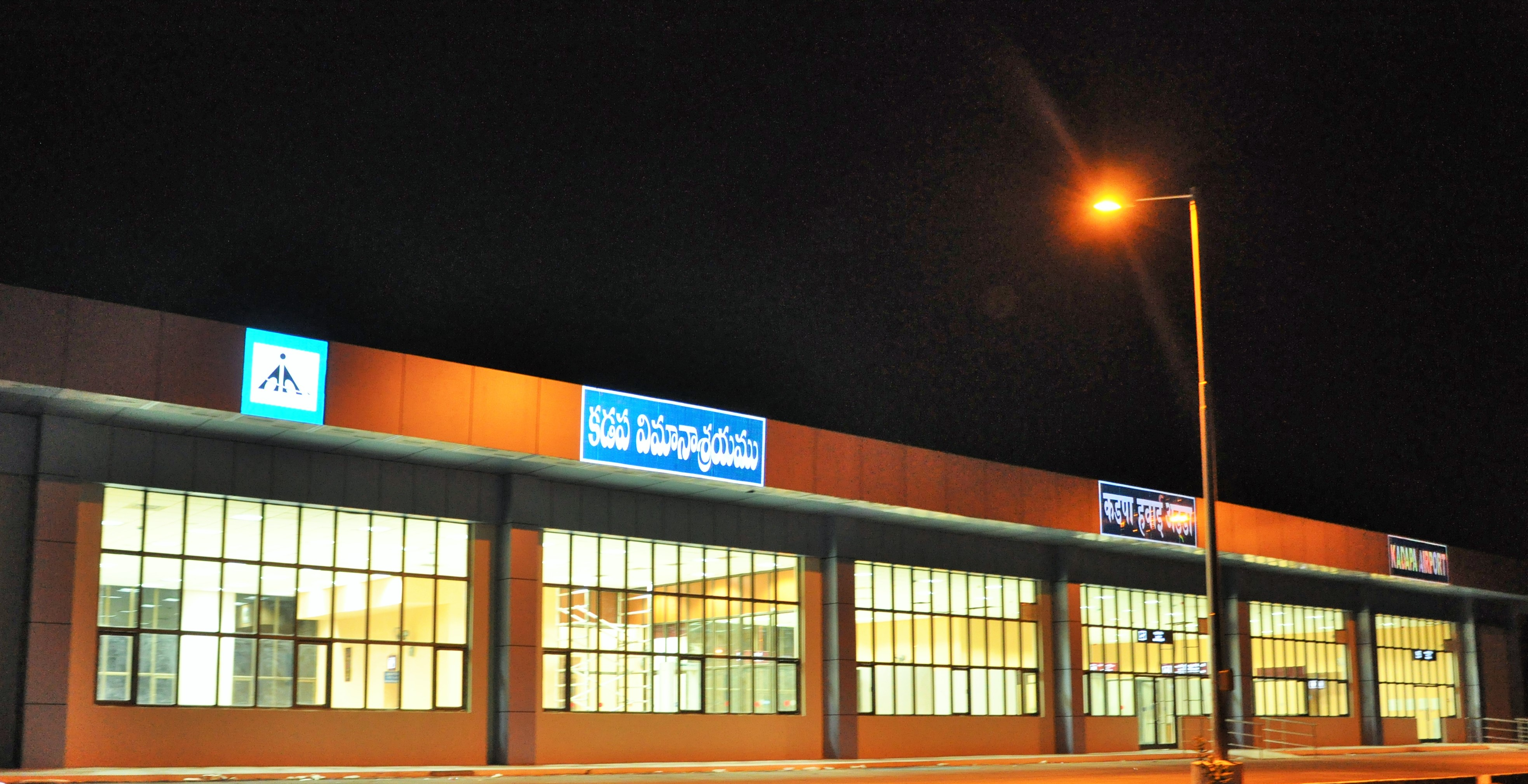
- IATA: CDP; ICAO: VOCP

Summary
- Airport type: Public
- Owner: Airports Authority of India
- Operator: Airports Authority of India
- Serves: Kadapa
- Location: Kadapa, Andhra Pradesh, India
- Opened: 1953; 73 years ago
- Elevation AMSL: 430 ft (130 m)
- Coordinates: 14°30′36″N 078°46′22″E
- Website: Cuddapah Airport

Map
- Location of airport in Andhra Pradesh CDP (India)

Runways
Direction	Length		Surface
Direction	ft	m	Surface
11/29	8,248	2,514	Asphalt

Statistics (April 2025 - March 2026)
- Passengers: 70,450 (▲33.6%)
- Aircraft movements: 1,672 (▲7.4%)
- Cargo tonnage: 0 ( 0%)
- Source: AAI

Kadapa Airport (IATA: CDP, ICAO: VOCP) is a domestic airport serving Kadapa in Andhra Pradesh, India. It is located 12 km (7.5 mi) from the city, and is spread over 669.5 acres (270.9 ha) of land. It has been upgraded at a cost of ₹ 42 crore. The upgraded airport was inaugurated on 7 June 2015 by the then Minister of Civil Aviation, Ashok Gajapathi Raju. The terminal building has a capacity to handle 100 peak hour passengers at a time and the apron can accommodate seven ATR-72 type aircraft.

== History ==
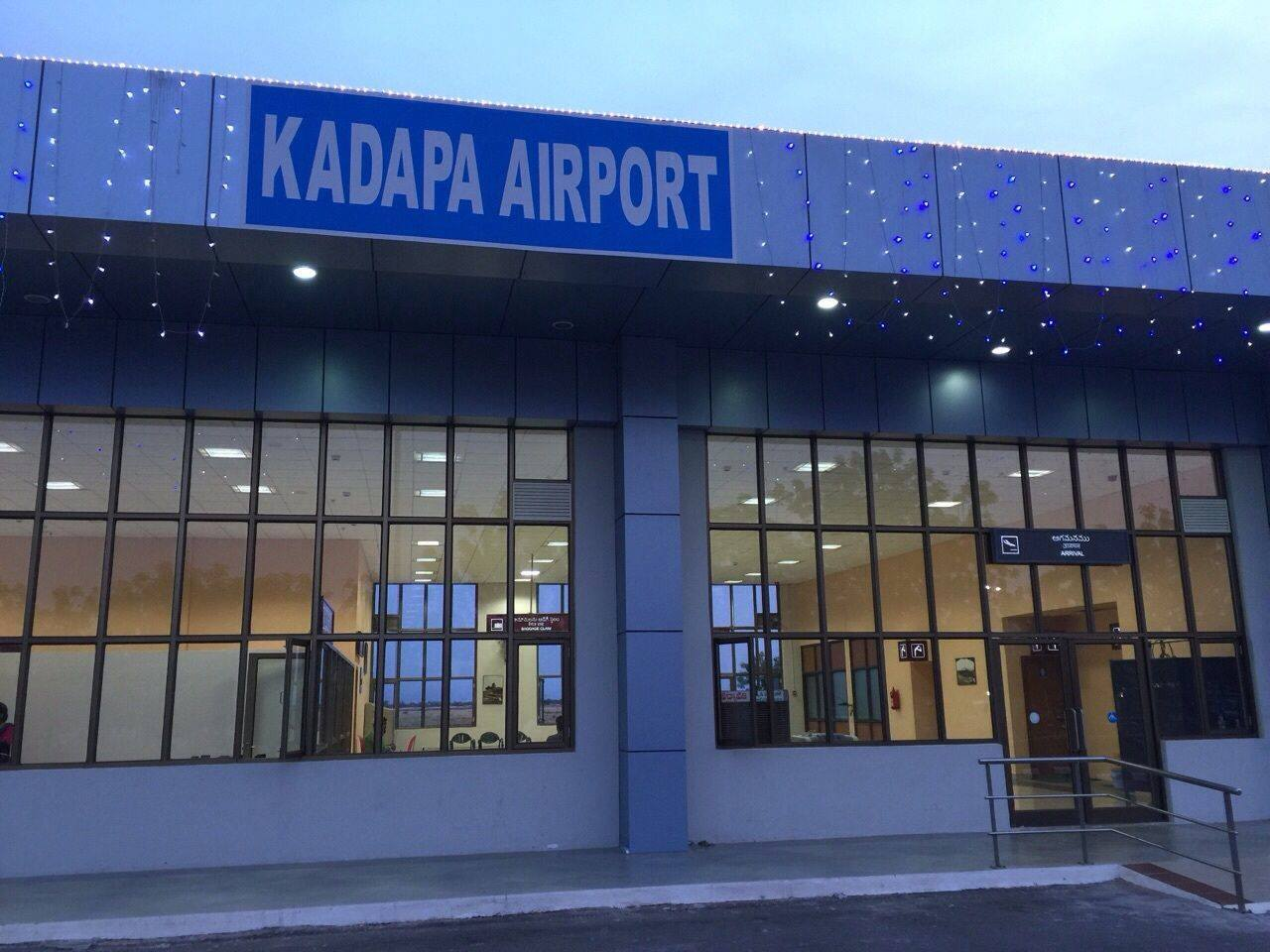
Terminal of the airport

The airport was constructed in 1953, and initially had a 3,500 ft (1,067 m) runway. In the 1980s, Vayudoot operated services to Kadapa from Hyderabad. The State Government and the Airports Authority of India (AAI) entered into a memorandum of understanding in March 2007 for developing the existing airports at Kadapa and Warangal to handle ATR-42 and ATR-72 type of aircraft.

In 2009, a new 6,562 ft × 150 ft (2,000 m × 46 m) runway was completed under the Build, Operate and Transfer (BOT) basis at a cost of ₹ 21 crore. In addition, an 11 km-long (6.8-mile) compound wall was constructed with an outlay of ₹ 24 crore. In the second phase, an air traffic control building, passenger terminal, parking bays and internal roads were built at a cost of ₹ 13 crore. Other facilities were developed at an estimated cost of ₹ 8 crore.

Scheduled commercial flights to the airport resumed on 7 June 2015 when Air Pegasus launched thrice weekly ATR 72 service to Bengaluru. However, flights were soon cancelled due to poor passenger loads. In April 2016, TruJet introduced flights to Hyderabad, which were too cancelled after a few months.

The airport was one of the 70 airports selected under the government's UDAN scheme to increase regional air connectivity. In March 2017, TruJet reintroduced daily flights to Hyderabad in September 2017, to Mysore via Chennai in November 2017, and to Vijayawada in March 2018. The airport is now connected by IndiGo with Bengaluru, Hyderabad, and Visakhapatnam.

== Facilities ==
=== Terminal ===
The existing terminal has mostly basic facilities available due to its small size. It has booking counters, check-in kiosks, seating areas, conveyor belts, baggage handling and scanning systems, washrooms, CCTVs, restaurants, a few retail stores and souvenir shops, a lost and found service, free WiFi, child care facilities, cargo handling services, medical facilities, facilities for physically challenged passengers, duty free, porter service, foreign exchange counters and tourist information desks.

=== Airfield ===
The airport has a passenger terminal covering an area of about 1,250 m^{2} (13,500 sq ft) and is capable of handling over 100 passengers during peak hours and 100,000 passengers annually, an Air Traffic Control (ATC) tower, a fuel and a fire station, a technical block, an apron for handling seven ATR-72 type aircraft, with two taxiways connecting to the runway, and the runway, oriented 11/29, which has been extended from 2,000 m (6,600 ft) to 2,514 m (8,248 ft) in February 2024, making it capable of serving narrowbody aircraft like the Airbus A320 and Boeing 737.

== Expansion ==
The airport has been under development since 2007. As of April 2024, the runway has been extended to 2,514 m (8,248 ft) with a width of 45 m (148 ft) from 1,517 m (4,977 ft) and 2,000 m (6,600 ft), respectively, and the apron has been expanded to handle seven ATR-72 type aircraft from only two aircraft at a time in 2023. The existing terminal was built in 2012. In order to cater to the growing traffic, demands and stimulate socio-economic development and tourism in the state, a new terminal was proposed by the Airports Authority of India (AAI) and the Government of Andhra Pradesh, which will be much larger than the existing terminal. Hence, the new terminal's foundation stone was laid virtually by Prime Minister Narendra Modi on 10 March 2024.

The new terminal will be built adjacent to the existing terminal to its east, at an estimated cost of ₹266 crore (US$28 million). It will be spread across an area of 16,455 m^{2} (177,120 sq ft) and will be equipped with 24 check-in counters, two conveyor belts, three X-ray baggage scanning machines, a parking space for accommodating 375 cars and three aerobridges. It will have a peak-hour serving capacity of 1,800 people and an annual footfall of 2.5 million passengers. The terminal will also have several other facilities and amenities to enhance passenger experience, ensure efficiency and conservation of the environment, like escalators, elevators, restaurants, retail stores, lounges, specialised facilities for physically challenged and senior citizen passengers, adequate greenery in its premises, rainwater harvesting systems and consuming electricity through solar power. In addition to the terminal, the key roads connecting Kadapa to Bengaluru, Tirupati, and Nellore will be widened to strengthen the district's connectivity and infrastructure, owing to increased traffic flow on the roads after the completion of the terminal. Construction on the terminal will begin in the latter half of 2024, and will be completed by 2–3 years, i.e., 2026/27.

== Airlines and destinations ==
Airlines	Destinations
IndiGo	Chennai, Hyderabad, Vijayawada

== See also ==
- Vijayawada Airport
- Bhogapuram Airport
- Kurnool Airport
