= Orvakal =

Village in Andhra Pradesh, India

- Village
- Orvakallu
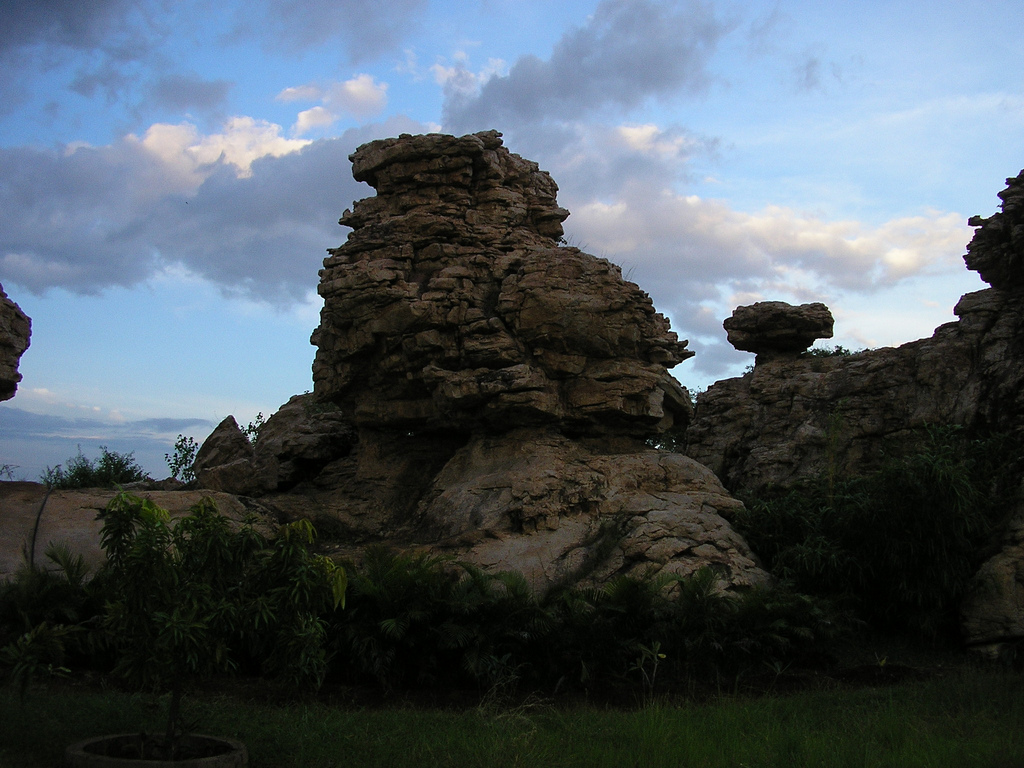
- Orvakal Rock Garden
- Nickname: Rock Town
- Interactive map of Orvakal
- Location in Andhra Pradesh, India
- Coordinates: 15°41′03″N 78°10′34″E
- Country: India
- State: Andhra Pradesh
- District: Kurnool
- Mandal: Orvakal

Government
  - Type: Grama Panchayat

Population (2011)
  - Total: 4,869

Languages
  - Official: Telugu
- Time zone: UTC+5:30 (IST)
- Postal code: 518010

Orvakal is a village and the headquarters of Orvakal mandal, located in the Kurnool district of Andhra Pradesh, India. Orvakal is part of the Kurnool Urban Development Authority (KUDA) and also situated along the Hyderabad-Bengaluru Industrial Corridor (HBIC).

== Geography ==
The village is known for the Orvakal Rock Garden, featuring silica and quartz rock formations interspersed with water pools. The Kethavaram Rock paintings, dating back to the Paleolithic era, are also located within the Orvakal Rock Formations.

== Administration ==
Orvakal is a Gram panchayat, headed by a Sarpanch. It is part of the Panyam Assembly constituency in the Andhra Pradesh Legislative Assembly, currently represented by Gowru Charitha Reddy of the Telugu Desam Party (TDP). Orvakal is also part of the Nandyal Lok Sabha constituency, which is represented by Byreddy Shabari, also from the TDP.

The village falls under the Kurnool revenue division and is governed by a Mandal Revenue Officer (MRO), also known as the Tehsildar. Orvakal comes under the jurisdiction of the Kurnool civil court.

== Transport ==
A four-lane section of National Highway 40 (NH40), formerly NH18 passes through Orvakal, providing road connectivity to Kurnool, Nandyal, Hyderabad, Bengaluru, Tirupati, and Chennai. The nearest railway station is the Kurnool City railway station, situated in Kurnool. Orvakal is also home to the Uyyalawada Narasimha Reddy Airport, which began operations on 25 March 2021. The airport currently offers flights to Bengaluru, Chennai, and Visakhapatnam.

== Health ==
Orvakal has a Community Health Center (CHC) serving both Orvakal and Kallur mandals.

== Education ==
The primary and secondary school education is provided by government, aided, and private schools, under the state's School Education Department, with instruction in English and Telugu.
