= Sri Sathya Sai Airport =

Airport of Andhra Pradesh, India

- IATA: PUT; ICAO: VOPN

Summary
- Airport type: Private
- Location: Puttaparthi
- Elevation AMSL: 1,558 ft (475 m)
- Coordinates: 14°08′57″N 077°47′28″E

Map
- Location within Andhra Pradesh Location within India

Runways
Direction	Length		Surface
Direction	ft	m	Surface
09/27	7,315	2,230	Asphalt

Sri Sathya Sai Airport (IATA: PUT, ICAO: VOPN) is located at Puttaparthi, Sri Sathya Sai district in the state of Andhra Pradesh, India. The airport is named after Sathya Sai Baba, a spiritual guru and philanthropist. It is a small airport with facilities for chartered flights rather than commercial aircraft. The airport was inaugurated in 1990 to serve the Sri Sathya Sai Institute of Higher Medical Sciences during emergency situations. The airport's 1000-metre-long airstrip and terminal building were constructed by L&T ECC. The runway was later extended to enable the operation of larger jet aircraft.

== History ==
The Sri Sathya Sai Airport was opened on 24 November 1990 to provide emergency air service to the Sri Sathya Sai Institute of Higher Medical Sciences, as well as commercial service for visitors to Prasanthi Nilayam, Sathya Sai Baba's ashram located in the village.

Until 2006, the Sri Sathya Sai Airport had scheduled flights to Mumbai and to Chennai airport operated by Indian Airlines. From 2006 to 2008, Indian Airlines operated flights to Puttaparthi as a stopover for their Hyderabad-Vishakhapatnam services. Indian Airlines also offered flights to Bangalore thrice a week in 2005. On 12 November 2005, the Indian low-cost carrier Air Deccan commenced operations from and to Hyderabad and Chennai twice a day. Delhi-based charter airline Jagson Airlines also began service to Puttaparthi from Chennai in 2007, before they ceased in 2008. Kingfisher Airlines served Puttaparthi from Hyderabad and Bangalore from 2007 until 2008, when all scheduled flights to Puttaparthi ceased. The airport continues to serve the Sri Sathya Sai Institute of Higher Medical Sciences, Puttaparthi for emergency purposes, and hosts dignitaries who visit Prashanti Nilayam and the surrounding area.

== See also ==
- List of airports in Andhra Pradesh
