= Kurnool Airport =

Domestic airport in Andhra Pradesh, India

Uyyalawada Narasimha Reddy Airport
- IATA: KJB; ICAO: VOKU

Summary
- Airport type: Public
- Owner: Andhra Pradesh Airports Development Corporation Limited
- Serves: Kurnool
- Location: Orvakal, Kurnool district, Andhra Pradesh, India
- Opened: 28 March 2021; 5 years ago
- Time zone: Indian Standard Time (+5:30)
- Elevation AMSL: 344.11 m (1,129.0 ft)
- Coordinates: 15°42′22″N 78°09′39″E
- Website: Official website

Map
- Location of airport in Andhra Pradesh KJB (India)

Runways
Direction	Length		Surface
Direction	ft	m	Surface
10/28	6,562	2,000	Asphalt

Statistics (April 2025 - March 2026)
- Passengers: 20,563 (▲5.8%)
- Aircraft movements: 1,106 (▲14.5%)
- Cargo tonnage: —
- Source: AAI

Kurnool Airport (IATA: KJB, ICAO: VOKU), also known as Orvakal Airport and officially known as Uyyalawada Narasimha Reddy Airport, is a domestic airport serving the city of Kurnool, Andhra Pradesh, India.

It is located at Orvakal, situated on National Highway 40, about 18 km (11 mi) from Kurnool and 54 km (34 mi) from Nandyal. The airport covers an area of 1,008 acres (4.08 km^{2}), and has been built at a cost of ₹153 crore (equivalent to ₹187 crore or US$19 million in 2026) as a low-cost airport to improve connectivity to remote areas. It began commercial operations on 28 March 2021. It has been named after Uyyalawada Narasimha Reddy, who was a prominent independence activist in the 19th century. A flight training school operates at this airport.

== History ==
=== Planning ===
In 2008, the Government of Andhra Pradesh invited for expressions of interest to develop eight minor airports in the state, including an airport at Kurnool. Each airport was expected to cost ₹50 crore (equivalent to ₹152 crore or US$16 million in 2026). The airports were to be built in 500–600 acres (2.0–2.4 km^{2}) with a runway length of 6,000 feet (1,800 m). The construction of this airport was chosen, because Kurnool has a large paper mill producing 300 tonnes of paper every day.

In July 2009, the government scrapped the plans as no companies posted bids for the construction of the airport. The companies sought the construction to be infeasible due to low expectations of revenues. In October 2009, the government planned to invite fresh bids for 4 airports including Kurnool Airport, to be constructed in 500 acres (2.0 km^{2}). The government offered additional incentives including exemption from value-added taxes and waiver of lease rentals for the first seven years, once the airport is operational.

Later in 2013, the Government of India identified Kurnool as one of the 50 locations for the development of low-cost airports, in order to improve connectivity to remote areas.

=== Construction ===
The airport was originally planned to be constructed over 639 acres (2.59 km^{2}), of which 456 acres (1.85 km^{2}) are in Pudicherla, 115 acres (0.47 km^{2}) in Orvakal and 67 acres (0.27 km^{2}) in Kannamadakala. The Ministry of Civil Aviation gave the site clearance in February 2016. The state government approved the allocation of land in February 2017. The final construction was done in 1,008 acres (4.08 km^{2}) at a cost of ₹153 crore (equivalent to ₹187 crore or US$19 million in 2026).

The foundation stone was laid in June 2017 by the then Chief Minister of Andhra Pradesh, N. Chandrababu Naidu. After trial runs were successfully conducted at the end of 2018, he inaugurated the airport on 8 January 2019. At this time, the runway and terminal buildings were constructed, however, works related to the Air Traffic Control (ATC) tower was not completed. Two years later, on 15 January 2021, the Directorate General of Civil Aviation (India) (DGCA) granted the license to the airport for public use. Later, on 27 January, the Bureau of Civil Aviation Security (BCAS) granted security clearance.

On 25 March 2021, the airport was re-inaugurated by the current Chief Minister of Andhra Pradesh, Y. S. Jagan Mohan Reddy. He also named the airport as Uyyalawada Narasimha Reddy Airport, commemorating the prominent freedom fighter, Uyyalawada Narasimha Reddy, who originated from Kurnool district during the 19th century. The government also started discussion for a pilot training institute and an aircraft repair centre. On 28 March 2021, commercial operations began with a ceremonial IndiGo flight from Bangalore.

== Facilities ==
The airport has a passenger terminal, an ATC tower, a 2,000-metre (6,600-foot) runway, with an apron for parking of four aircraft, among other ancillary facilities, like the fire station. It has been categorized as '3C' category airport, and is capable of handling turboprop aircraft like ATR-72 and Bombardier Q-400.

== Airlines and destinations ==
Airlines	Destinations
IndiGo	Bengaluru, Vijayawada, Visakhapatnam

== Statistics ==
Passenger traffic at Kurnool Airport (2025–2026)
Month	2025	2026	Change (%)
January	2,100	1,975	−6.0%
February	1,460	1,648	+12.9%
March	1,683	1,577	−6.3%
April	1,817	1,341	−26.2%
May	2,055	1,851	−9.9%
June	1,719	1,702	−1.0%
July	1,783	1,374	−22.9%
August	1,778	1,361	−23.5%
January–August total	14,395	12,829	−10.9%

== Access ==
The airport is located directly on National Highway 40 connecting Kurnool and Nandyal. There are no railway lines connecting the airport.

== See also ==
- Aviation in India
- List of Airports in India
- Vijayawada Airport
