= Nagarjuna Sagar Airport =

Airport of Andhra Pradesh, India

- IATA: none; ICAO: VONS

Summary
- Airport type: Public
- Owner/Operator: Airport Authority of India
- Serves: Nagarjuna Sagar
- Location: Nagarjuna Sagar, Andhra Pradesh
- Time zone: Indian Standard Time (+5:30)
- Elevation AMSL: 656 ft / 200 m
- Coordinates: 16°32′33″N 079°19′07″E

Map

Runways
Direction	Length		Surface
Direction	ft	m	Surface
27/09	5,050	1,539	Asphalt

Nagarjuna Sagar Airport is an airport located in Palnadu district in the state of Andhra Pradesh, India. The airport is used by private and chartered aircraft and has no scheduled services. There are plans to upgrade the facility to enable scheduled commercial operations. In March 2020, the Airports Authority of India announced it was considering developing the airport into a water aerodrome for use by seaplanes.
