= Donakonda Airport =

- IATA: none; ICAO: VODK

Summary
- Airport type: Public
- Owner: Airports Authority of India
- Operator: Airports Authority of India
- Location: Donakonda, Andhra Pradesh
- Time zone: IST (UTC+05:30)
- Elevation AMSL: 467 ft (142 m)
- Coordinates: 15°49′28″N 079°29′12″E

Maps
- Location in Andhra Pradesh VODK (India)
- Interactive map of Donakonda Airport

Runways
| Direction | Length | | Surface |
| Direction | ft | m | Surface |
|---|---|---|---|
| 05/23 | 3,000 | 914 | N/A |

Donakonda Airport (ICAO: VODK) is located at Donakonda in the Prakasam district of Andhra Pradesh, India. It was constructed during the Second World War by the British to refuel its aircraft. It is owned by the Airports Authority of India and is closed. There have been plans to redevelop the airstrip by the Airports Authority of India, but so far there is no further development.

== History ==
The airport was constructed during World War II by the British administration for military purposes and emergency aircraft refuelling operations. After Indian independence, the airport remained under limited use and gradually became inactive.

In later years, the Government of Andhra Pradesh proposed redevelopment of the airport for regional connectivity and industrial development in the Donakonda region.

== Infrastructure ==
The airport has a single runway designated 05/23. The airport currently lacks a passenger terminal and modern navigational facilities. The airstrip is maintained by the Airports Authority of India.

== Airlines and destinations ==
There are no scheduled commercial air services.
