= Rajahmundry Airport =

Airport of Andhra Pradesh, India

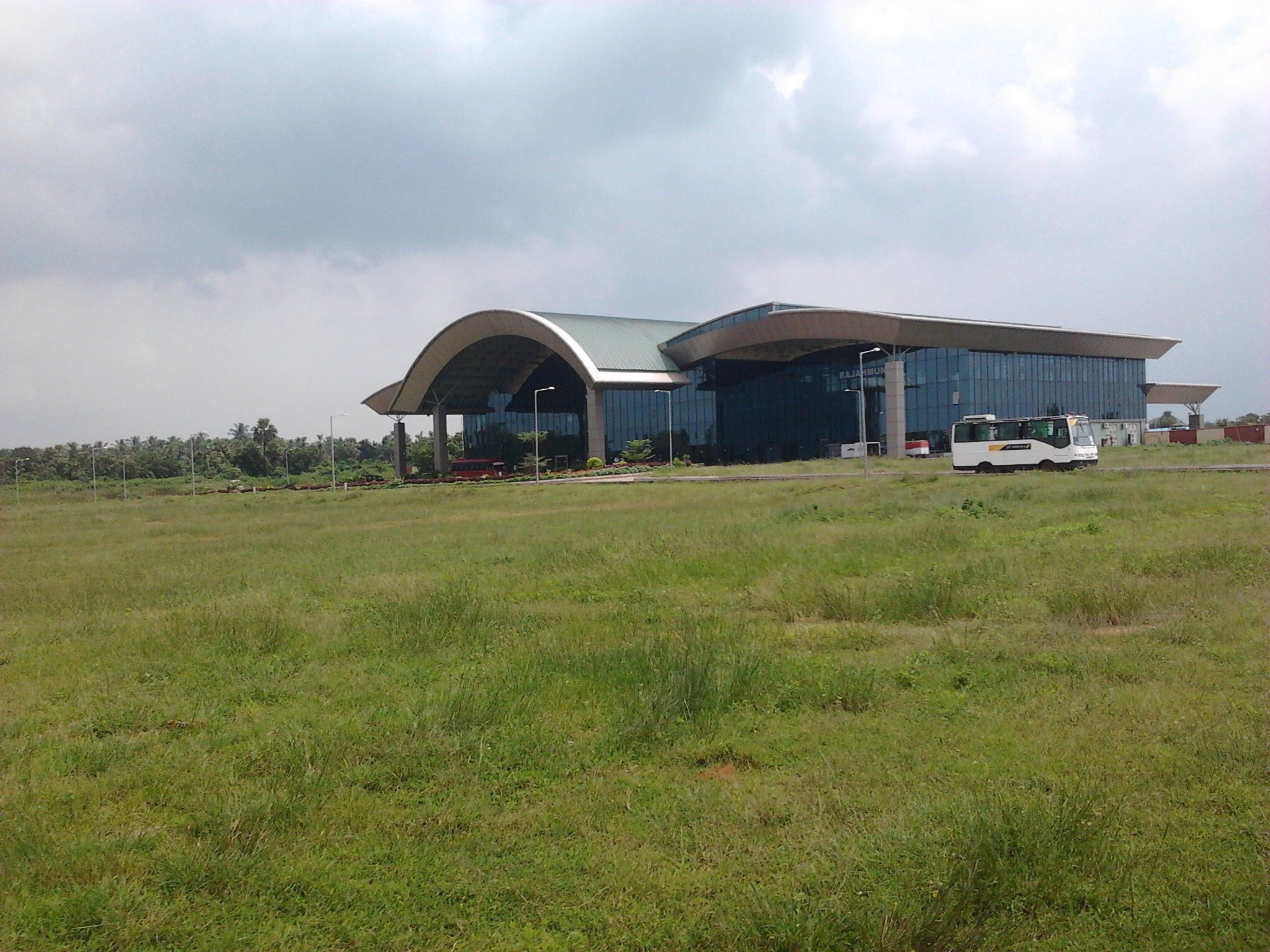
- IATA: RJA; ICAO: VORY

Summary
- Airport type: Public
- Operator: Airports Authority of India
- Serves: Rajamahendravaram
- Location: Madhurapudi, near Rajamahendravaram, Andhra Pradesh, India
- Elevation AMSL: 151 ft (46 m)
- Coordinates: 17°06′37″N 081°49′06″E
- Website: Rajahmundry Airport

Map
- Location within Andhra Pradesh Location within India

Runways
Direction	Length		Surface
Direction	ft	m	Surface
05/23	10,384	3,165	Asphalt

Statistics (April 2025 – March 2026)
- Passengers: 561,320 (▲14.8%)
- Aircraft movements: 8,441 (▲0.2%)
- Cargo tonnage: 25.2 (▲33.3%)
- Source: AAI

Rajahmundry Airport (IATA: RJA, ICAO: VORY) is a domestic airport serving the city of Rajamahendravaram, Andhra Pradesh, India. It is located at Madhurapudi, 16 km (9.9 mi) north from the city centre, on National Highway 516E (NH-516E). Before modernisation, it was used by Vayudoot. It is used by the helicopters of Oil and Natural Gas Corporation (ONGC) and other government agencies for offshore oil exploration operations.

== History ==
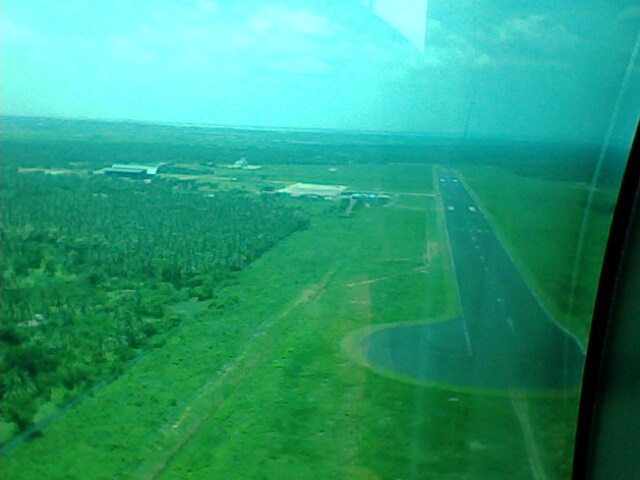
Aerial view of the airport before modernisation

The airport was constructed during the British era and is spread over an area of 1,214 acres (491 ha). It was served by Vayudoot between 1985 and 1994 and by VIF Airways in 1995. The Government of Andhra Pradesh signed a Memorandum of Understanding (MoU) worth ₹23 crore (equivalent to ₹76 crore or US$7.9 million in 2026) with the Airports Authority of India (AAI) in February 2007 for modernising the airport. Works on a new terminal building to accommodate 150 passengers and an Air Traffic Control (ATC) tower were completed in 2011 at a cost of ₹38 crore (US$3.9 million). The terminal was inaugurated on 16 May 2012.

Limited by the runway length, airlines operated smaller 70-seater turboprop aircraft like the ATR-72 and the De Haviland Canada Dash 8-Q400. The AAI has extended the existing runway from 1,749 metres (5,738 ft) to 3,165 metres (10,384 ft) to enable landing of aircraft like the Airbus A320, Boeing 737 Max and Airbus A321, which was inaugurated by the former Minister of Civil Aviation, Suresh Prabhu, on 12 February 2019. Approximately, 800 acres have been acquired for this expansion. The government is aiming to develop this airport to international standards. IndiGo started Airbus A320 operations to Mumbai and Delhi from 1 and 12 December 2024.

== Expansion ==
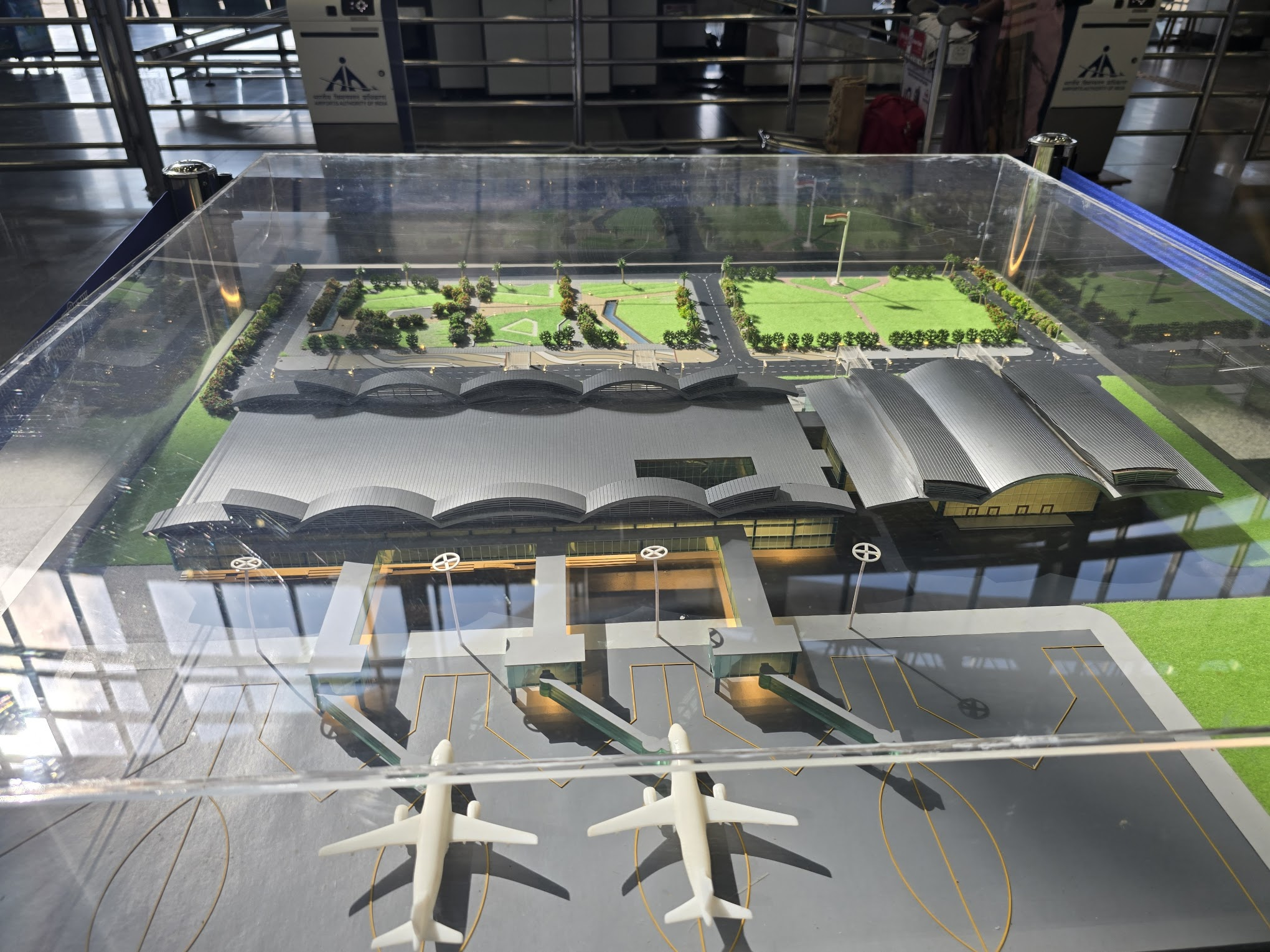
New Terminal Model at display in Rajahmundry Airport waiting hall

To facilitate trade, connectivity, socio-economic development and tourism in the state, the airport has been undergoing stages of expansion since the Airports Authority of India (AAI) first drafted the plan for future development of the airport in 2007. The present state of the airport will not be able to cope with the rising traffic and demands in the future. Following the runway's extension to its current length in 2019, the airport was proposed for an upgrade to international standards. The existing terminal was proposed to be small in area, leaving space for a larger terminal to serve future requirements.

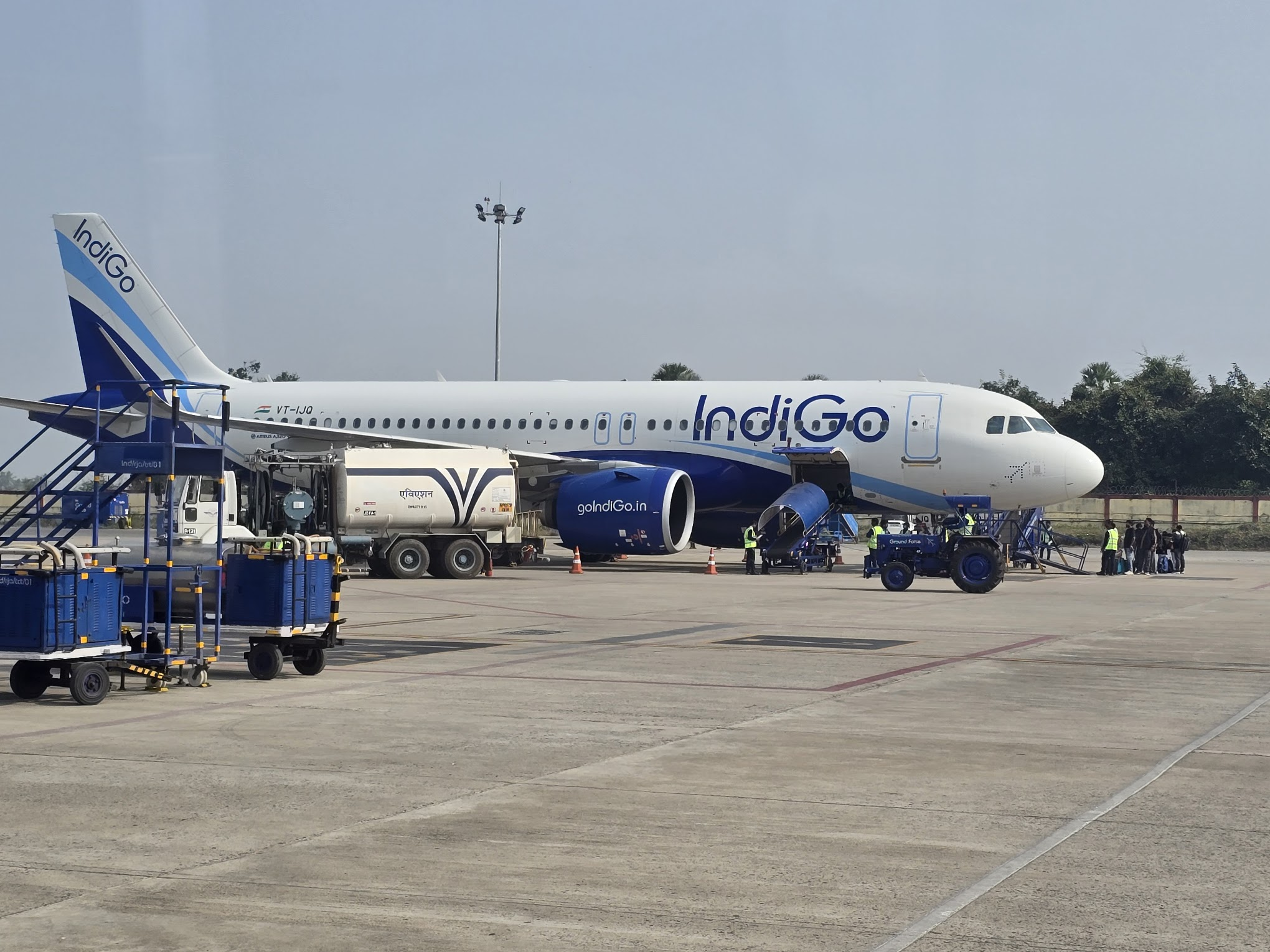
Indigo operates A320 from Rajahmundry to destinations such as Delhi, Mumbai while ATR aircraft fly to Hyderabad, Bangalore and Chennai.

In December 2023, the Minister of Civil Aviation, Jyotiraditya Scindia, laid the foundation stone for the construction of the new passenger terminal building. The new terminal, to be developed by the AAI, at an estimated cost of ₹ 350 crore, will span an area of about 22,000 sq.m. It will have 28 check-in counters and four aerobridges for handling Airbus A320 and Boeing 737 type aircraft, and will be able to serve over 2,100 passengers during peak hours and 3 million passengers annually, which is ten times more than the current capacity of the existing terminal, thus, making it possible for the airport to achieve the target of converting into an international airport. For improving trade, like the export of flowers and aqua products from Rajamahendravaram and adjoining regions, a cargo terminal will also be established within the area of the new terminal. An additional 17,000 sq m will also be acquired for future expansion. The new terminal, along with the cargo terminal, are expected to be completed after 2 years of construction, by December 2025.

IndiGo Airlines has introduced a new daily flight service connecting Puducherry and Rajahmundry as part of its revised winter schedule, operating via Hyderabad to enhance regional connectivity across South India. The inclusion of Rajahmundry in the existing Puducherry–Hyderabad–Bengaluru route is expected to greatly benefit government officials, business travellers, and passengers heading to Yanam — a key region of the Union Territory situated approximately 73 km from Rajahmundry.

== Airlines and destinations ==
Airlines	Destinations
Alliance Air	Tirupati
Fly91	Hyderabad, Tirupati
IndiGo	Bengaluru, Chennai, Delhi, Hyderabad, Mumbai

== Statistics ==
Passenger traffic at the airport has increased from 2024 to 2025, with annual volumes ranging between 0.4 to 0.5 million passengers.

Passenger traffic at Rajahmundry Airport (2025–2026)
Month	2025	2026	Change (%)
January	53,813	48,740	−9.4%
February	46,524	41,684	−10.4%
March	49,275	41,449	−15.9%
April	48,784	40,833	−16.3%
May	54,963	50,766	−7.6%
June	47,677	47,758	+0.2%
July	44,108	45,058	+2.2%
August	45,802	44,652	−2.5%
January–August total	390,946	360,940	−7.7%

== See also ==
- List of airports in Andhra Pradesh
- UDAN Scheme
- Airports Authority of India
