= Tirupati Airport =

Airport serving Tirupati, Andhra Pradesh, India

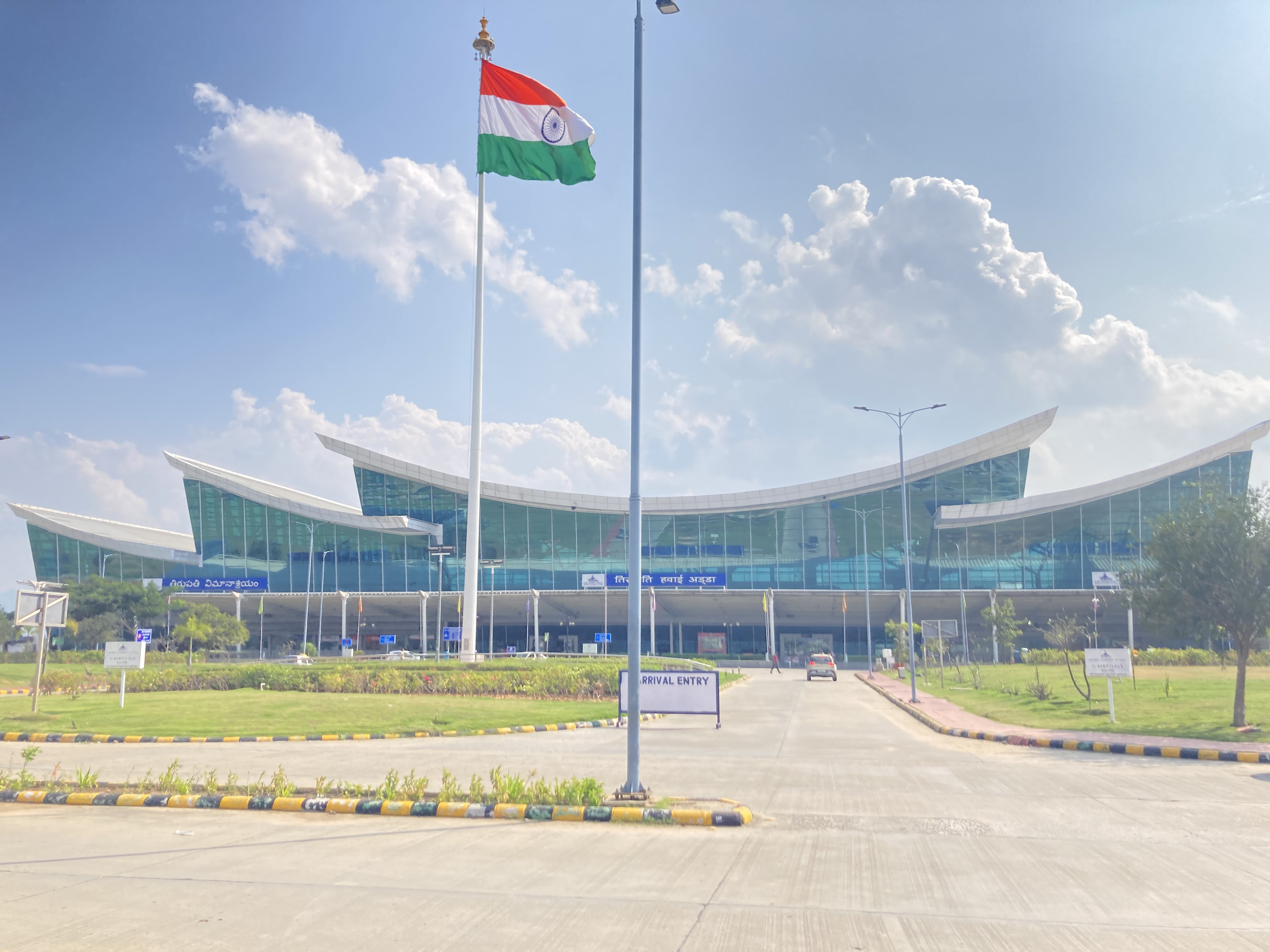
- IATA: TIR; ICAO: VOTP

Summary
- Airport type: Public
- Owner/Operator: Airports Authority of India
- Serves: Tirupati
- Location: Renigunta, Tirupati district, Andhra Pradesh, India
- Opened: 1971; 55 years ago
- Elevation AMSL: 107 m (351 ft)
- Coordinates: 13°38′16″N 079°32′50″E
- Website: Tirupati Airport

Map
- Location within Andhra Pradesh Location within India

Runways
Direction	Length		Surface
Direction	m	ft	Surface
08/26	3,810	12,500	Asphalt

Statistics (April 2025–March 2026)
- Passengers: 11,96,176 (▲20.1%)
- Aircraft movements: 13,229 (▲9.8%)
- Cargo tonnage: 333.1 (▲147.1%)
- Source: AAI

Tirupati Airport (IATA: TIR, ICAO: VOTP) is an international airport serving Tirupati, Andhra Pradesh, India. It is located off the National Highway 71, in Renigunta, about 14 km (8.7 mi) from Tirupati.

== History ==
The airport was commissioned in 1971. In 2008, an expansion plan was proposed, and the project got underway in 2010. The construction of a new passenger terminal began in 2012, and was inaugurated in October 2015. The airport was declared an international airport by the Government of India in June 2017. In 2018, the Airports Authority of India proposed an expansion of the existing runway and apron to accommodate larger aircraft, and the foundation stone for the project was laid on 20 February 2019. In November 2019, the minister of civil aviation announced plans for a construction of a new lounge at the airport and that the runway expansion, estimated to cost ₹1.77 billion (US$18 million), would be completed by 2021. However, the expansion of the runway and installation of supporting aids, were completed only in February 2025.

== Privatisation ==
The Public–Private Partnership Appraisal Committee (PPPAC) approved the Ministry of Civil Aviation’s proposal to privatise 11 Airports operated by Airports Authority of India, which will be offered in five public–private partnership (PPP) bundles. Under the proposal, Tirupati Airport would be placed under private management through a 50-year PPP agreement, with a one-year joint-management period. As of 24 August 2026, no private operator had been selected.

== Facilities ==
=== Runway ===
The airport has a single asphalt runway, designated as 8/26. The runway was extended from 2,286 m (7,500 ft) to 3,810 m (12,500 ft) in February 2025. It is equipped with an Instrument Landing System, Precision approach path indicator, and other landing aids.

=== Apron ===
The airport has a parking space for three narrow body aircraft in the main apron attached to the old terminal building. A new apron, capable of accommodating two wide body aircraft and one narrow body aircraft, was added later. It is planned to be expanded to include four parking bays for narrow body aircraft, and was equipped with night parking facilities.

=== Terminal ===
A new integrated terminal referred to as Garuda terminal was opened adjacent to the existing domestic terminal in 2015. Spread over an area of 16,500 m^{2} (178,000 sq ft) and built at a cost of ₹1.75 billion (US$18 million), it has a capacity to handle 500 domestic and 200 international passengers at a time.

== Airlines and destinations ==
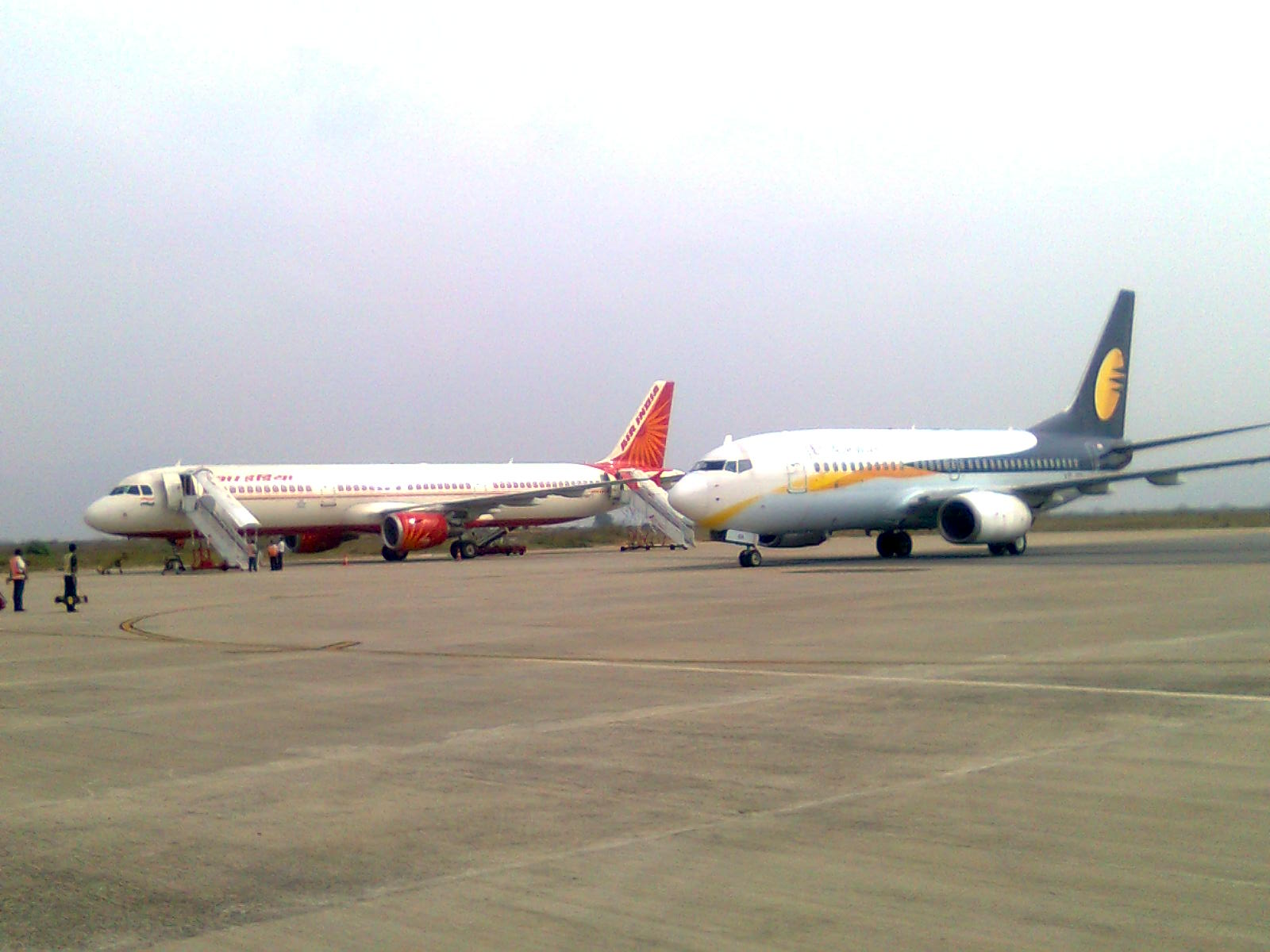
Apron area of the airport

As of August 2026, the airport has scheduled commercial services operated by five airlines. Though declared an international airport earlier in 2017, the first international flight took off from the airport only on 6 December 2024. While e-visa facility was introduced in the airport in August 2026, it does not have operational regular international services.

Airlines	Destinations
Air India	Delhi
Air India Express	Hyderabad
Alliance Air	Rajamahendravaram
Fly91	Bengaluru, Hyderabad, Vijayawada, Rajamahendravaram
IndiGo	Bengaluru, Hyderabad
Star Air	Shimoga

== Accidents and incidents ==
- On 15 November 1993, Indian Airlines flight 440 (IC-440), an Airbus A300 (registered VT-EDV), operating on a scheduled flight from Madras (now Chennai) to Hyderabad, crashed into the paddy fields near Tirupati Airport. It had been diverted to the airport due to poor weather and ran out of fuel. There were no casualties, but the aircraft was damaged beyond repair.

== Stats ==
Passenger traffic at Tirupati Airport (2025–2026)
Month	2025	2026	Change (%)
January	98,178	101,664	+3.6%
February	96,222	82,694	−14.1%
March	110,058	86,983	−21.0%
April	104,584	65,441	−37.4%
May	106,200	71,911	−32.3%
June	102,726	66,595	−35.2%
July	112,120	62,868	−43.9%
August	90,685	57,426	−36.7%
January–August total	820,773	595,582	−27.4%

== See also ==
- List of airports in Andhra Pradesh
