= Vijayawada Airport =

Airport serving Vijayawada, Andhra Pradesh, India

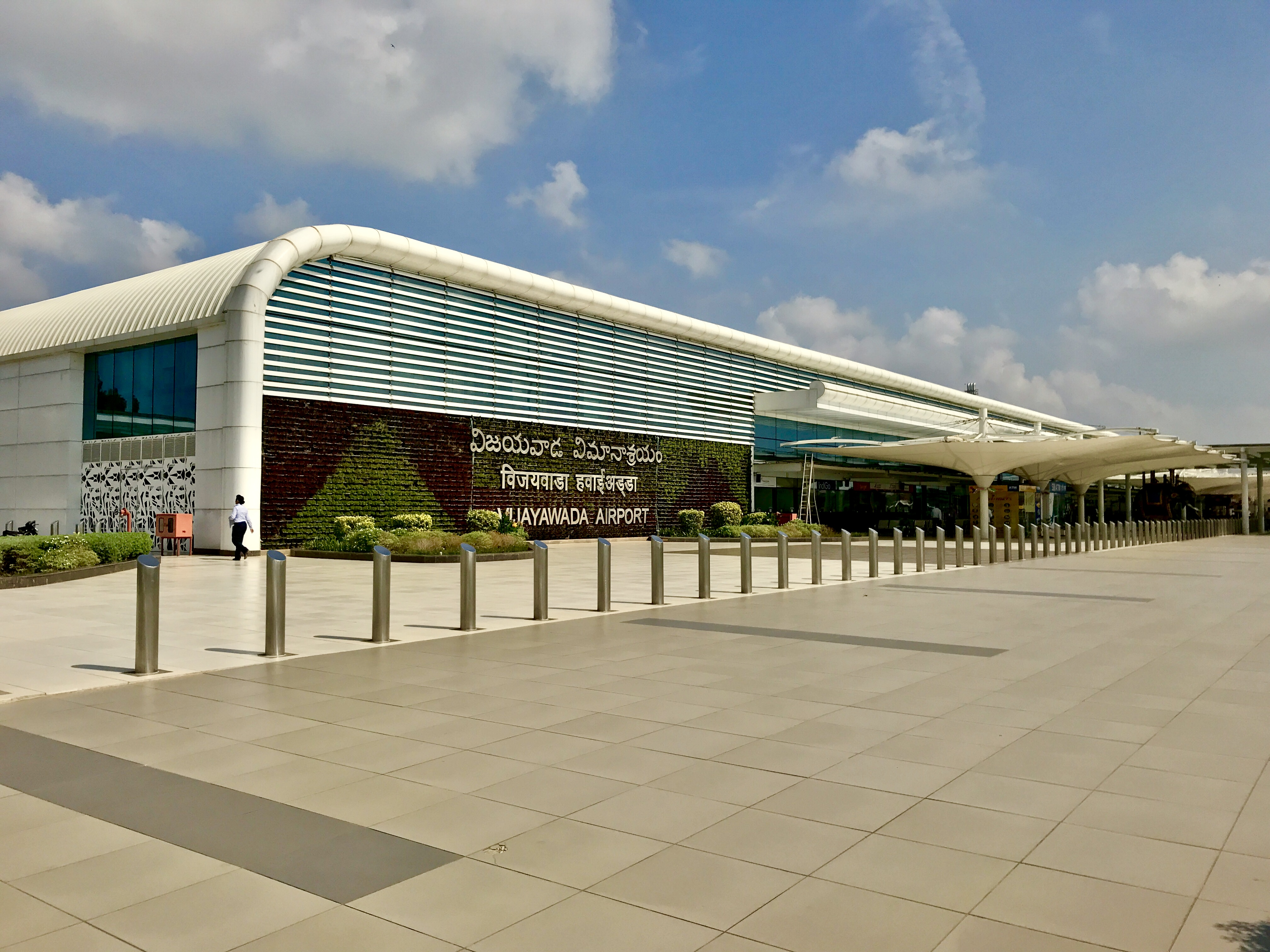
- IATA: VGA; ICAO: VOBZ

Summary
- Airport type: Public
- Owner: Airports Authority of India
- Operator: Airports Authority of India
- Serves: Vijayawada, Andhra Pradesh Capital Region
- Location: Gannavaram, Krishna district, Andhra Pradesh, India
- Elevation AMSL: 82 ft (25 m)
- Coordinates: 16°31′44″N 80°47′45″E
- Website: Vijayawada Airport

Map
- Location within Andhra Pradesh Location within India

Runways
| Direction | Length | | Surface |
| Direction | ft | m | Surface |
|---|---|---|---|
| 08/26 | 11,024 | 3,360 | Asphalt |

Statistics (April 2025 – March 2026)
- Passengers: 14,11,958 (▲1.7%)
- Aircraft movements: 17,112 (▼7.8%)
- Cargo tonnage: 1,264.5 (▼10.5%)
- Source: AAI

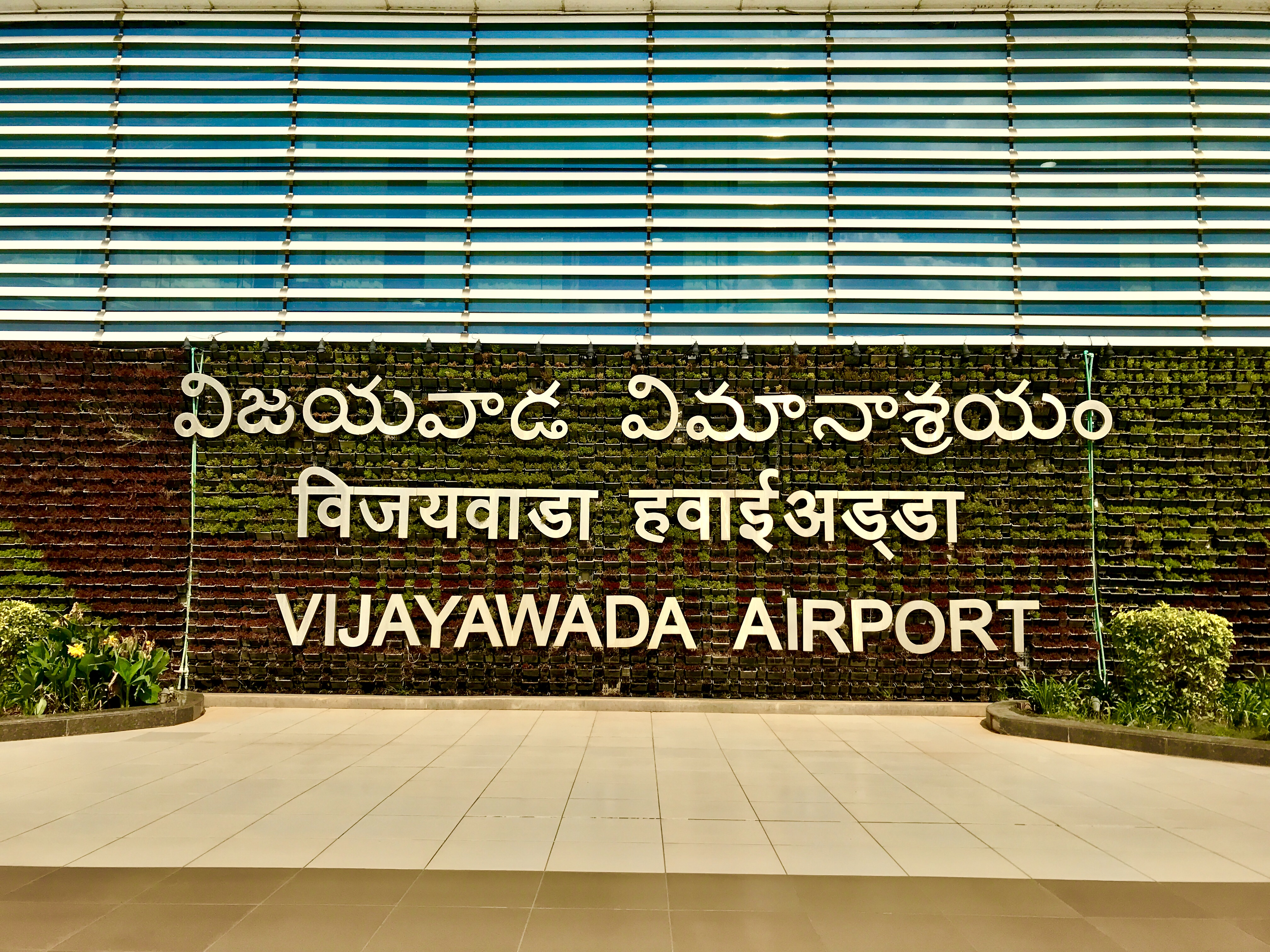
Name board at the airport

Vijayawada Airport (IATA: VGA, ICAO: VOBZ) is an international airport serving the city of Vijayawada and the Andhra Pradesh Capital Region in India. The airport is located in Gannavaram, approximately 20 kilometres (12 mi) from Vijayawada.

== History ==
The airfield at Gannavaram served as an army base during World War II, after which it was converted into a civilian airport. Passenger operations remained limited for decades. Air Deccan introduced a daily service between Hyderabad and Vijayawada in September 2003. Until 2011, the airport accommodated only four flights a day, operated primarily by Kingfisher Airlines.

To cater to increasing passenger traffic, the foundation stone for a new interim terminal building was laid in October 2015. The terminal, designed to handle two million passengers per annum, was inaugurated on 12 January 2017. Following the shift of domestic operations to the interim terminal, the old airport terminal building was closed, refurbished, and equipped with customs and immigration facilities to handle international services.

The Government of India officially granted international status to the airport on 3 May 2017. After the state government offered viability gap funding (VGF) to airlines, private operator IndiGo secured the contract to operate international routes. On 4 December 2018, an IndiGo flight departed for Singapore Changi Airport, marking the inaugural international flight from Vijayawada.

== Facilities ==
=== Runways and structure ===
The airport features a single runway, designated 08/26, which was extended to 3,360 by 45 metres (11,024 ft × 148 ft) in 2019. The runway is capable of handling both narrow-body and wide-body aircraft such as the Boeing 777 and Boeing 747, and is equipped with a Category I ILS. The airport's apron has been expanded in phases and currently features 24 parking bays capable of accommodating Airbus A320, Boeing 737, ATR-72, and Bombardier Q400 aircraft.

=== Interim terminal ===
The interim terminal spreads over 12,999 square metres and includes a check-in area, arrival hall, meet-and-greet service staircase, aviation lounge, and a baggage pick-up area. The terminal handles up to 500 passengers at peak hours and features 18 check-in counters, two conveyor belts, and six boarding gates.

== Expansion ==
To accommodate future growth, a new integrated terminal building is currently under construction. The foundation stone was laid on 4 December 2018 by the then Minister of Civil Aviation, Suresh Prabhu, and Vice-President Venkaiah Naidu. The 51,315-square-metre steel and glass structure is being developed by the Airports Authority of India (AAI) at an estimated cost of ₹824.28 crore.

The new terminal is designed to handle 3.5 million passengers annually and accommodate up to 1,200 peak-hour passengers (800 domestic and 400 international). It will feature 24 check-in counters, eight customs and immigration counters, six passenger boarding bridges, nine departure gates, and modernized infrastructure to support larger flight volumes. Due to delays caused by the COVID-19 pandemic and subsequent contractor changes in early 2026, the completion deadline was revised. The terminal is scheduled for full operational readiness by late 2026.

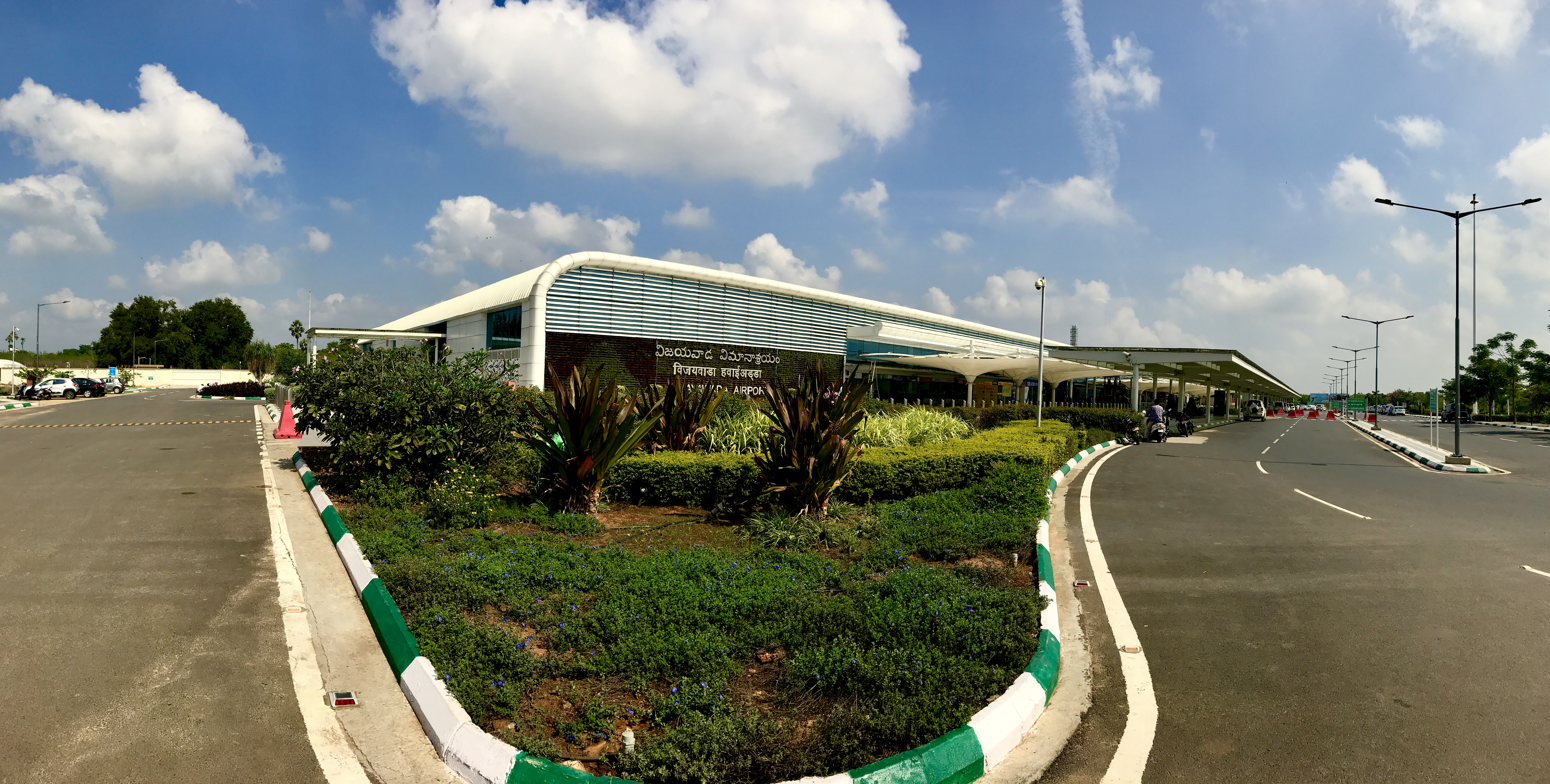
Panorama of interim terminal

== Transport ==
Vijayawada Airport is situated on National Highway 16, which connects Chennai and Kolkata. The airport is accessible from the city via public buses, airport taxis, and ride-hailing services.

== Airlines and destinations ==
| Airlines | Destinations |
|---|---|
| Air India | Delhi, Mumbai |
| Air India Express | Bengaluru, Hyderabad, Sharjah, Visakhapatnam |
| Fly91 | Hyderabad, Tirupati |
| IndiGo | Bengaluru, Chennai, Delhi, Hyderabad, Kadapa, Kurnool, Mumbai, Singapore, Tirupati, Varanasi, Visakhapatnam |

== Statistics ==
Annual domestic passenger traffic and aircraft movements at Vijayawada Airport
| Year | Domestic passenger traffic | | Domestic aircraft movements | |
| Year | Passengers | Percent change | Aircraft movements | Percent change |
|---|---|---|---|---|
| 2025–26 | 1,411,325 | +1.6% | 17,536 | −5.5% |
| 2024–25 | 1,388,943 | +35.4% | 18,558 | +24.3% |
| 2023–24 | 1,025,734 | +10.3% | 14,934 | +4.4% |
| 2022–23 | 929,765 | +60.6% | 14,300 | +61.9% |
| 2021–22 | 579,111 | +33.2% | 8,833 | +28.7% |
| 2020–21 | 434,737 | −61.4% | 6,863 | −54.8% |
| 2019–20 | 1,125,551 | −4.5% | 15,190 | −19.9% |
| 2018–19 | 1,178,559 | +57.9% | 18,957 | +58.0% |
| 2017–18 | 746,392 | +19.9% | 11,999 | +16.1% |
| 2016–17 | 622,354 | +56.1% | 10,333 | +54.8% |
| 2015–16 | 398,643 | +71.9% | 6,676 | +43.9% |
| 2014–15 | 231,931 | NA | 4,639 | NA |

Passenger traffic at Vijayawada Airport (2025–2026)
| Month | 2025 | 2026 | Change (%) |
|---|---|---|---|
| January | 131,061 | 135,389 | +3.3% |
| February | 127,552 | 115,025 | −9.8% |
| March | 130,775 | 113,807 | −13.0% |
| April | 112,011 | 109,585 | −2.2% |
| May | 113,562 | 125,059 | +10.1% |
| June | 115,744 | 115,492 | −0.2% |
| July | 110,740 | 111,986 | +1.1% |
| August | 118,965 | 117,204 | −1.5% |
| January–August total | 960,410 | 943,547 | −1.8% |

== Accidents and incidents ==
- On 28 August 1980, Vickers Viscount VT-DJC of Huns Air was damaged beyond economic repair when the nosewheel collapsed after the aircraft bounced three times on landing.

== See also ==
- Alluri Sitarama Raju International Airport
- Rajahmundry Airport
- Tirupati Airport
