= Alluri Sitarama Raju International Airport =

International Airport in Andhra Pradesh, India

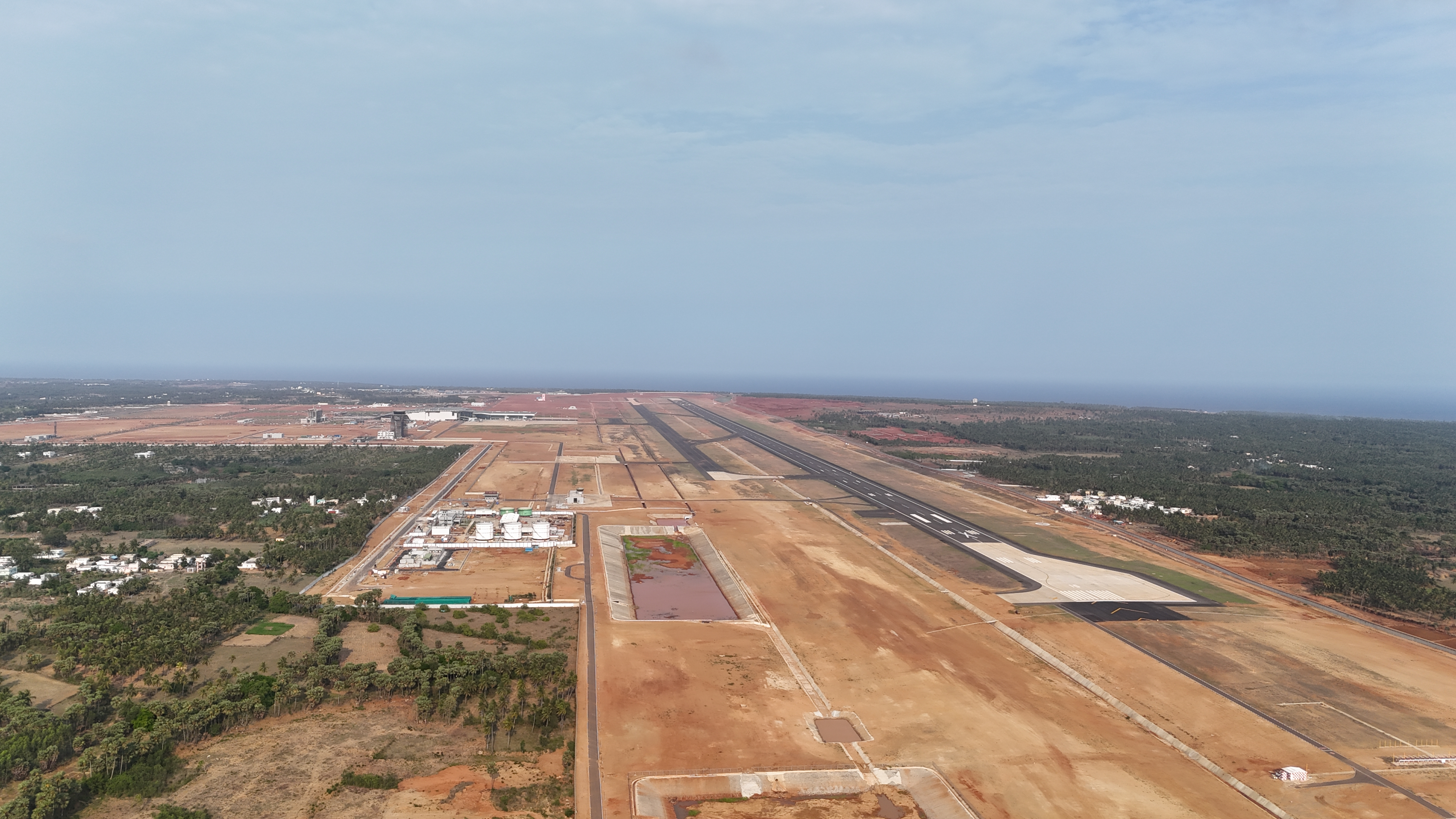
- The airport site in May 2026
- IATA: VTZ; ICAO: VOVI

Summary
- Airport type: Public
- Owner: Andhra Pradesh Airports Development Corporation Limited
- Operator: GMR Visakhapatnam International Airport Limited
- Serves: Visakhapatnam Metropolitan Region
- Location: Bhogapuram, Vizianagaram district, Andhra Pradesh, India
- Opened: 17 August 2026; 2 months ago
- Elevation AMSL: 18 m (59 ft)
- Coordinates: 17°58′34″N 083°30′14″E
- Website: Alluri Sitarama Raju International Airport

Map
- Location within Andhra Pradesh Location within India

Runways
Direction	Length		Surface
Direction	m	ft	Surface
10/28	3,800	12,467	Asphalt

Alluri Sitarama Raju International Airport (IATA: VTZ, ICAO: VOVI), also known as Visakhapatnam International Airport, is an international airport located at Bhogapuram in Vizianagaram district, Andhra Pradesh, India. The airport is located off the National Highway 16, about 45 km (28 mi) from Visakhapatnam and serves the Visakhapatnam Metropolitan Region.

The airport was developed by GMR Visakhapatnam International Airport Limited, a subsidiary of GMR Group. In September 2024, the airport was named after Indian revolutionary and freedom fighter Alluri Sitarama Raju. The first phase of the project was developed at a cost of ₹45.92 billion (US$480 million). The airport was inaugurated on 1 August 2026 and was opened for commercial operations on 17 August 2026.

== History ==
=== Background ===
The North Andhra region was previously served by a civil enclave, operated by the Airports Authority of India (AAI) at INS Dega, a naval air station of the Indian Navy. It was a designated customs airport, and was permitted to operate only limited international flights. The Indian Navy had stated that it was unable to allocate additional slots for commercial flights at the airport due to its increased utilisation for military activities.

=== Planning and development ===
In the 2015-16 budget, the state government, led by N. Chandrababu Naidu, proposed a greenfield airport at Bhogapuram. The site was located off the National Highway 16, about 45 km (28 mi) from Visakhapatnam. The Airports Authority of India gave its technical approval for this site in June 2015. The opposition, led by Y. S. Jagan Mohan Reddy, challenged the proposal arguing it as detrimental to farmers, and advocated for expanding the existing airport instead. Despite opposition from a section of farmers, the Ministry of Civil Aviation cleared the project in December 2015.

By March 2016, the state government had acquired 2,703 acres (1,094 ha) of land for the project, and further acquisition of land was delayed due to agitation from locals. The project was approved by the state government in September 2016, and was to be developed on a public–private partnership basis. The airport received environmental clearance in August 2017, and the bids for its development were submitted in the same month. The foundation stone for the airport was laid by the then chief minister Chandrababu Naidu, on 14 February 2019. In March 2020, the state government allocated 2,200 acres (890 ha) for the development of the airport, while keeping aside 500 acres (200 ha) of land for future development.

The contract for the development and operations of the airport was awarded to GMR Visakhapatnam International Airport Limited (GVIAL), a special-purpose entity owned by the GMR Group, which was set up in June 2020. In 2022, the state government signed an agreement with the Indian Navy to transition civilian operations from the existing Visakhapatnam airport to the new airport in phases over the next 30 years. The airport is being developed in three phases, with the first phase projected to cost ₹45.92 billion (US$480 million). Upon the completion of the first phase, the airport is expected to be able to handle 6.3 million passengers annually, that will increase to 12 and 18 million after the completion of the second and third phases, respectively. After the land acquisition was completed, then state chief minister Jagan Mohan Reddy re-laid the foundation stone for the project on 3 May 2023.

=== Construction and opening ===
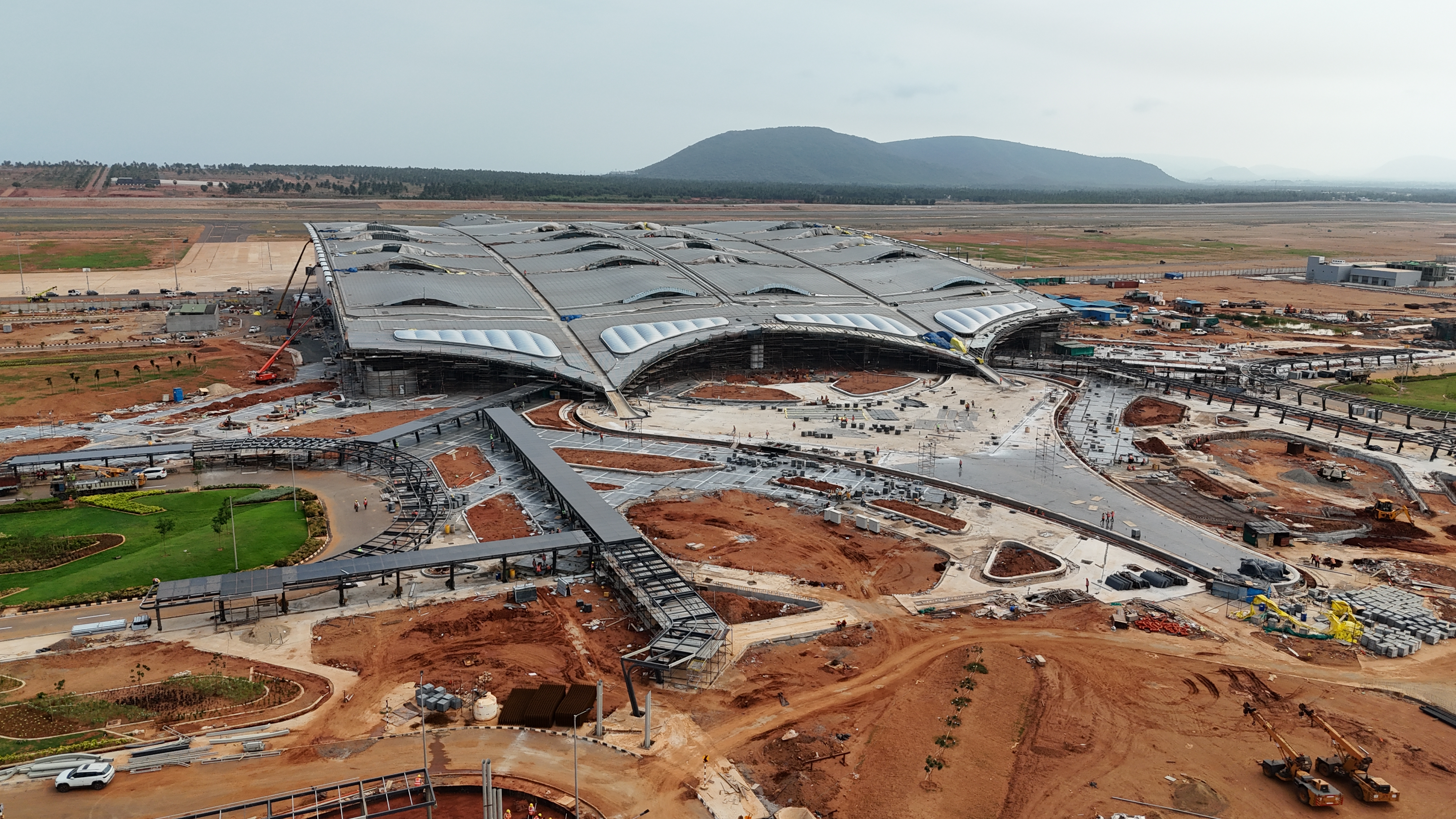
Aerial view of the under construction passenger terminal as of May 2026

Construction officially began later that year in November 2023, with Larsen & Toubro being awarded the contract for the civil works by the GMR group. In September 2024, the union minister for civil aviation said that the project would be completed six months ahead of schedule. In September 2024, the state cabinet, chaired by Chief Minister Chandrababu Naidu, officially decided to name the facility after Alluri Sitarama Raju, Indian revolutionary and freedom fighter from the region. In November 2024, Tata group announced plans for commercial development near the airport and sought land allotment from the government.

Inaugration of the airport.

On 4 January 2026, the first validation flight landed at the airport as part of the requirements for obtaining an operating licence. In July 2026, the airport received its aerodrome licence from the Directorate General of Civil Aviation and necessary clearances from the Bureau of Civil Aviation Security. The airport was inaugurated on 1 August 2026 by prime minister Narendra Modi, while the commercial operations started on 17 August 2026.

== Facilities ==
=== Runway and parking bays ===
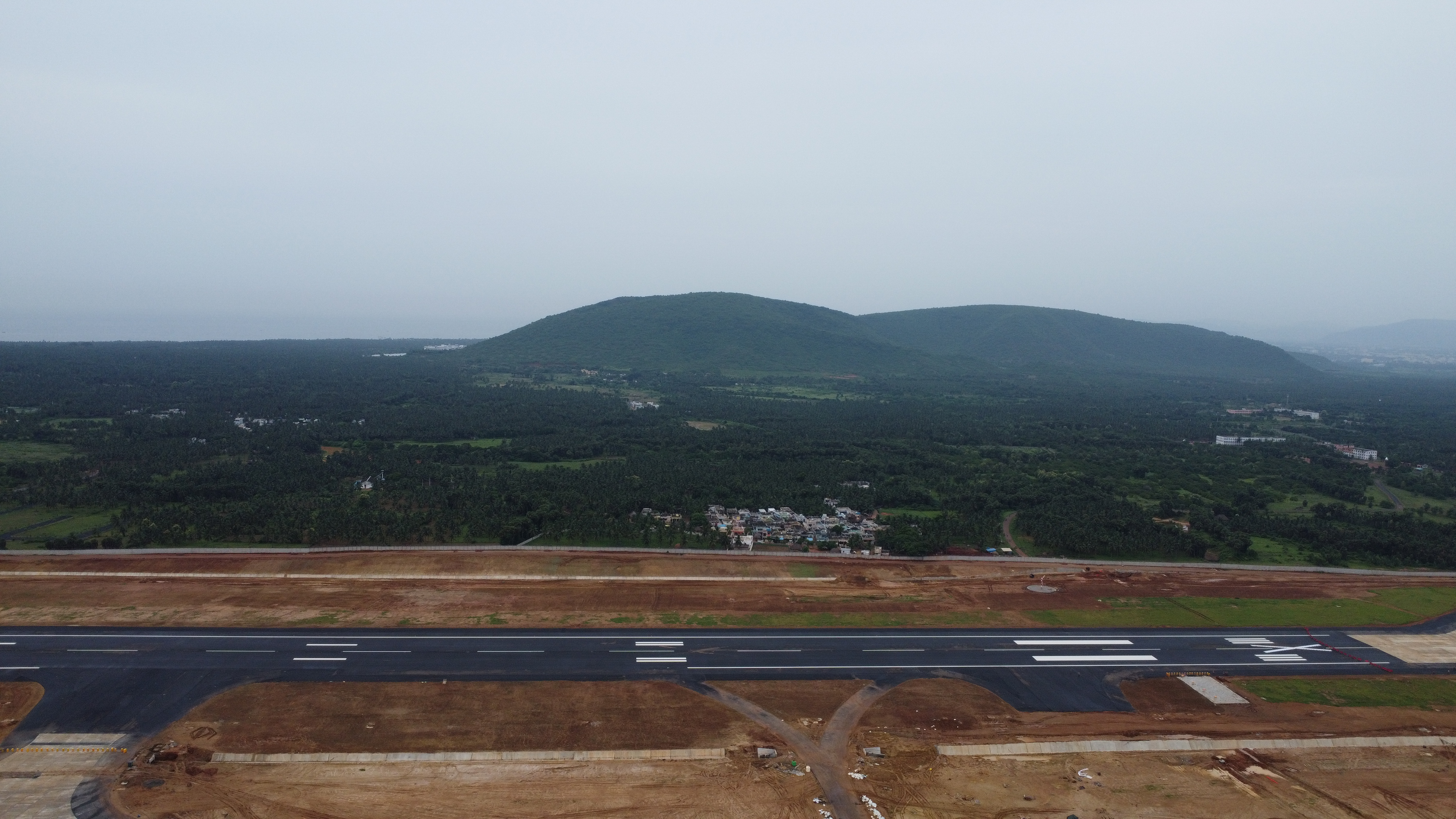
View of the runway

The airport has a single 3,800 m (12,500 ft) long and 45 m (148 ft) wide asphalt runway designated as 10/28 and equipped with a CAT I Instrument Landing System and VOR/DME. There is a 240 m × 90 m (790 ft × 300 ft) run off area on either end of the runway. The airport has a single main apron which has 14 parking bays numbered from 11 to 24. The main apron is connected by smaller taxiways B7 and B8 to the main taxiway. The main taxiway, designated as A, runs parallel to the runway, and has five approach ways to the main runway, which are designated as A3, A5, A7, A9, and A10. There are two parking bays for non-scheduled flights, an isolated parking bay for emergencies, and dedicated parking bays for cargo aircraft.

=== Terminals ===
The passenger terminal is spread over an area of 77,342 m^{2} (832,500 sq ft) and has a capacity to handle six million passengers per annum. The terminal is equipped with 22 check-in counters and 18 baggage drop counters, apart from security screening, baggage handling, and immigration facilities. There is a dedicated cargo terminal, which is spread over 5,000 m^{2} (54,000 sq ft) and is capable of handling up to 25,000 metric tonnes of cargo annually.

== Airlines and destinations ==
Effective 17 August 2026, commercial flight services that were operated from the earlier INS Dega were moved to this airport.

Airlines	Destinations
Air India	Delhi
Air India Express	Bangkok–Suvarnabhumi, Bengaluru, Hyderabad, Vijayawada
Akasa Air	Delhi
IndiaOne Air	Jeypore
IndiGo	Abu Dhabi, Bengaluru, Chennai, Delhi, Hyderabad, Kolkata, Mumbai, Navi Mumbai, Tirupati
Scoot	Singapore
