= Kurnool Lok Sabha constituency =

Constituency of the Indian parliament in Andhra Pradesh

Coordinates: 15.81°N 78.04°E

Kurnool AP-18
- Lok Sabha constituency
- Interactive Map Outlining Kurnool Lok Sabha constituency

Constituency details
- Country: India
- Region: South India
- State: Andhra Pradesh
- Assembly constituencies: Kurnool; Pattikonda; Kodumur; Yemmiganur; Mantralayam; Adoni; Alur
- Established: 1952
- Reservation: None

Member of Parliament
- 18th Lok Sabha
- Incumbent Bastipati Nagaraju Panchalingala
- Party: TDP
- Alliance: NDA
- Elected year: 2024
- Preceded by: Sanjeev Kumar

Kurnool Lok Sabha constituency is one of the twenty-five lok sabha constituencies of Andhra Pradesh in India. It comprises seven assembly segments and belongs to Kurnool district.

== Assembly segments ==
Kurnool Lok Sabha constituency presently comprises the following Legislative Assembly segments:

#	Name	District	Member	Party	Leading (in 2024)
137	Kurnool	Kurnool	Tumbalam Gooty Bharath	TDP	TDP
142	Pattikonda	Kurnool	K. E. Shyam Babu	TDP	TDP
143	Kodumur (SC)	Kurnool	Boggula Dastagiri	TDP	TDP
144	Yemmiganur	Kurnool	B. V. Jaya Nageswara Reddy	TDP	TDP
145	Mantralayam	Kurnool	Yellareddy Gari Balanagi Reddy	YSRCP	YSRCP
146	Adoni	Kurnool	P. V. Parthasarathi	BJP	TDP
147	Alur	Kurnool	Busine Virupakshi	YSRCP	TDP

== Members of Parliament ==
Year	Member	Party
1952	Y. Gadilingana Gowd	Praja Socialist Party
1952	H. Sitharama Reddy	Indian National Congress
1957	Osman Ali Khan	Indian National Congress
1962	Yashoda Reddy	Indian National Congress
1967	Y. Gadilingana Gowd	Swatantra Party
1971	K. Kodanda Rami Reddy	Indian National Congress
1977	Kotla Vijaya Bhaskara Reddy	Indian National Congress
1980	Kotla Vijaya Bhaskara Reddy	Indian National Congress (I)
1984	E. Ayyapu Reddy	Telugu Desam Party
1989	Kotla Vijaya Bhaskara Reddy	Indian National Congress
1991	Kotla Vijaya Bhaskara Reddy	Indian National Congress
1991^	Kotla Jayasurya Prakasha Reddy	Indian National Congress
1996	Kotla Vijaya Bhaskara Reddy	Indian National Congress
1998	Kotla Vijaya Bhaskara Reddy	Indian National Congress
1999	K. E. Krishna Murthy	Telugu Desam Party
2004	Kotla Jayasurya Prakasha Reddy	Indian National Congress
2009	Kotla Jayasurya Prakasha Reddy	Indian National Congress
2014	Butta Renuka	YSR Congress Party
2019	Sanjeev Kumar	YSR Congress Party
2024	Bastipati Nagaraju Panchalingala	Telugu Desam Party

== Election results ==
=== General Election 1989 ===
General Election, 1989: Kurnool
Party	Candidate	Votes	%	±%
INC	Kotla Vijaya Bhaskara Reddy	363,955	57.89	+9.38
TDP	Erasu Ayyapu Reddy	253,537	40.32	−9.62
Majority		110,418	17.57	
Turnout		628,754	64.91	−2.18
INC gain from TDP		Swing		

=== General Election 1991 ===
General Election, 1991: Kurnool
Party	Candidate	Votes	%	±%
INC	Kotla Vijaya Bhaskara Reddy	302,352	51.92	−5.97
TDP	S.V. Subba Reddy	249,885	42.91	+2.59
Majority		52,467	9.01	
Turnout		582,352	59.84	−5.07
INC hold		Swing		

=== General Election 1996 ===
General Election, 1996: Kurnool
Party	Candidate	Votes	%	±%
INC	Kotla Vijaya Bhaskara Reddy	323,208	46.43	−5.49
TDP	S.V. Subba Reddy	290,389	41.72	+1.19
Majority		32,819	4.71	
Turnout		696,103	60.58	+0.74
INC hold		Swing		

=== General Election 1998 ===
General Election, 1998: Kurnool
Party	Candidate	Votes	%	±%
INC	Kotla Vijaya Bhaskara Reddy	368,044	48.91	+2.48
TDP	K. E. Krishnamurthy	355,208	47.21	+5.49
Majority		12,836	1.70	
Turnout		752,475	66.16	+5.58
INC hold		Swing		

=== General Election 1999 ===
General Election, 1999: Kurnool
Party	Candidate	Votes	%	±%
TDP	K. E. Krishna Murthy	385,688	51.27	+4.06
INC	Kotla Vijaya Bhaskara Reddy	361,201	48.01	−0.90
Majority		24,487	3.26	
Turnout		752,286	64.66	−1.50
TDP gain from INC		Swing		

=== General Election 2004 ===
General Election, 2004: Kurnool
Party	Candidate	Votes	%	±%
INC	Kotla Jayasurya Prakasha Reddy	433,529	52.95	+4.94
TDP	K. E. Krishnamurthy	332,431	40.60	−10.67
Independent	James	17,410	2.13	
BSP	Reddipogu David	12,515	1.53	
Independent	T Seshaphani	8,899	1.09	
Pyramid Party of India	Dr Parameshwar Reddy	3,722	0.45	+0.04
Independent	Giri Nivarthi Rao Yadav	2,873	0.35	
TRS	V Ravinder Rao	2,723	0.33	
JP	R V Mohan Reddy	2,624	0.32	
Independent	K V Krishna Kumar	2,083	0.25	
Majority		101,098	12.35	
Turnout		818,809	62.48	−2.18
INC gain from TDP		Swing		

=== General Election 2009 ===
General Election, 2009: Kurnool
Party	Candidate	Votes	%	±%
INC	Kotla Jayasurya Prakasha Reddy	382,974	43.93	−9.02
TDP	B. T. Naidu	308,895	35.44	−5.16
PRP	Dr. Dandiya Khaja Peera	114,845	13.17	
Majority		74,079	12.35	
Turnout		871,708	62.48	−4.02
INC hold		Swing		

=== General Election 2014 ===
General Election, 2014: Kurnool
Party	Candidate	Votes	%	±%
YSRCP	Butta Renuka	472,782	44.36	
TDP	B. T. Naidu	428,651	40.22	
INC	Kotla Jayasurya Prakasha Reddy	116,603	10.94	
Majority		44,131	4.14	
Turnout		1,065,732	71.92	+9.44
YSRCP gain from INC		Swing		

=== General Election 2019 ===
2019 Indian general elections: Kurnool
Party	Candidate	Votes	%	±%
YSRCP	Sanjeev Kumar	602,554	50.98	
TDP	Kotla Jayasurya Prakasha Reddy	453,665	38.38	
INC	Ahmed Ali Khan	36,258	3.07	
Majority		148,889	12.60	
Turnout		11,90,672	75.69	+7.63
Registered electors		15,73,009		
YSRCP hold		Swing		

=== General election 2024 ===
2024 Indian general election: Kurnool
Party	Candidate	Votes	%	±%
TDP	Bastipati Nagaraju Panchalingala	658,914	49.50	
YSRCP	B. Y. Ramaiah	5,47,616	41.16	
INC	P. G. Rampullaiah Yadav	70,373	5.30	
NOTA	None of the above	10,511	0.80	
Majority		1,11,298	8.34	
Turnout		13,39,542	77.69	
TDP gain from YSRCP		Swing		

== See also ==
- List of constituencies of the Andhra Pradesh Legislative Assembly
