= Kotla Sujathamma =

Indian politician (born 1959)

Kotla Sujathamma (born 1959) is an Indian politician from Andhra Pradesh. She is a former Member of the Legislative Assembly from Dhone Assembly constituency representing the Indian National Congress.

Sujathamma is from Dhone, Nandyal district of Andhra Pradesh. She is married to former central minister Kotla Jayasurya Prakasha Reddy. She studied till Class 12.

Sujathamma first became an MLA winning the 2004 Andhra Pradesh Legislative Assembly election from Dhone Assembly constituency, in the erstwhile Kurnool district, representing the Indian National Congress. She polled 55,982 votes and defeated her nearest rival, Kambalapadu Ediga Prabhakar of the Telugu Desam Party, by a margin of 2609 votes. Dhone is the constituency formerly won by her father in law and former chief minister Kotla Vijaya Bhaskara Reddy. In the 2009 Andhra Pradesh Legislative Assembly election, she lost to K. E. Krishna Murthy of the Telugu Desam Party.
