= List of ministers of finance of Andhra Pradesh =

Head of the Ministry of Finance of the Government of Andhra Pradesh

Minister of Finance
- Ārdhika Śākha Mantrī
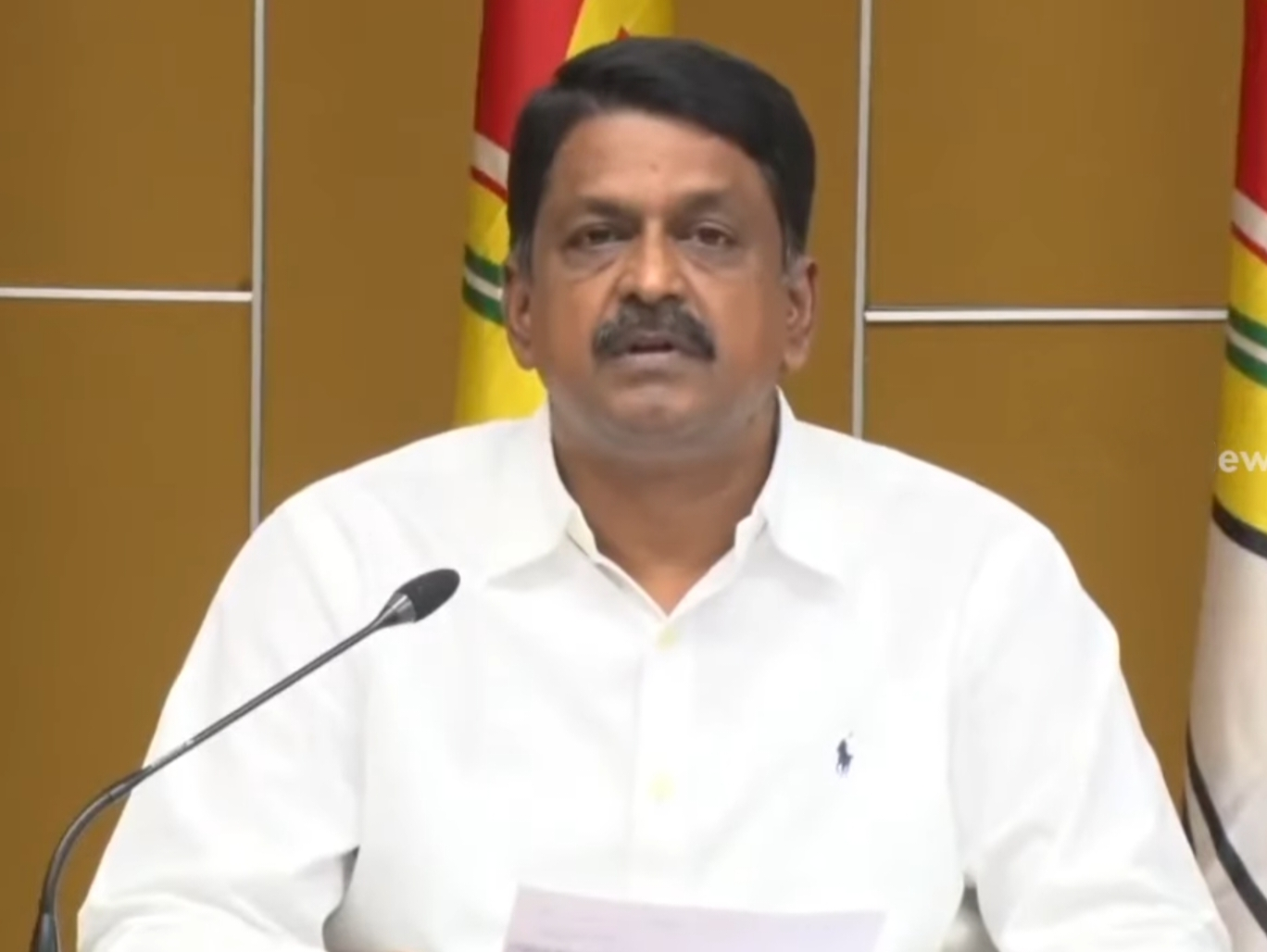
- Incumbent; Payyavula Keshav since 12 June 2024
- Department of Finance
- Abbreviation: FM
- Member of: Andha Pradesh Cabinet
- Reports to: Governor of Andhra Pradesh; Chief Minister of Andhra Pradesh; Andhra Pradesh Legislature
- Appointer: Governor of Andhra Pradesh; on the advice of the Chief Minister of Andhra Pradesh
- Inaugural holder: Yanamala Rama Krishnudu
- Formation: 8 June 2014

The Minister of Finance or Finance Minister is the head of the Department of Finance & Planning of the Government of Andhra Pradesh. The minister is one of the senior-most officers in the Cabinet of Andhra Pradesh, with as chief responsibility the maintenance of the state finances.

From June 2014 to May 2019, the Finance Minister of Andhra Pradesh was Yanamala Rama Krishnudu from the Telugu Desam Party, taking over the reins from Anam Ramanarayana Reddy before the bifurcation of the state into the present-day residual Andhra Pradesh and Telangana. Following the cabinet formation on 12 June 2024, Payyavula Keshav assumed the office under the Chief Ministership of N. Chandrababu Naidu.

== List of ministers ==
#	Portrait	Minister (Lifespan) Constituency	Term of office			Election (Term)	Party	Ministry	Chief Minister	Ref.
#	Portrait	Minister (Lifespan) Constituency	Term start	Term end	Duration	Election (Term)	Party	Ministry	Chief Minister	Ref.
1		Nara Chandrababu Naidu (born 1950); MLA for Kuppam	12 December 1994	1 September 1995	263 days	1994 (9th)	Telugu Desam Party	Rama Rao IV	N. T. Rama Rao	
2		Ashok Gajapathi Raju (born 1951); MLA for Vizianagaram	1 September 1995	11 October 1999	4 years, 40 days	1994 (10th)	Telugu Desam Party	Naidu I	Nara Chandrababu Naidu	
3		Yanamala Rama Krishnudu (born 1951); MLA for Tuni	11 October 1999	13 May 2004	4 years, 215 days	1999 (11th)	Telugu Desam Party	Naidu II	Nara Chandrababu Naidu	
4		Konijeti Rosaiah (born 1933); MLA for Bapatla & MLC	14 May 2004	24 November 2010	6 years, 194 days	2004 (12th) & 2009 (13th)	Indian National Congress	Reddy I & Reddy II & Rosaiah	Y. S. Rajasekhara Reddy & Konijeti Rosaiah	
5		Anam Ramanarayana Reddy (born 1950); MLA for Atmakur	25 November 2010	1 March 2014	3 years, 96 days	2009 (13th)	Indian National Congress	Kiran	Nallari Kiran Kumar Reddy	

#	Portrait	Minister (Lifespan) Constituency	Term of office			Election (Term)	Party	Ministry	Chief Minister	Ref.
#	Portrait	Minister (Lifespan) Constituency	Term start	Term end	Duration	Election (Term)	Party	Ministry	Chief Minister	Ref.
1		Yanamala Rama Krishnudu (born 1951); MLC	8 June 2014	29 May 2019	4 years, 355 days	2014 (14th)	Telugu Desam Party	Naidu III	N. Chandrababu Naidu	
2		Buggana Rajendranath Reddy (born 1970); MLA for Dhone	30 May 2019	11 June 2024	5 years, 12 days	2019 (15th)	YSR Congress Party	Jagan	Y. S. Jagan Mohan Reddy	
3		Payyavula Keshav (born 1965); MLA for Uravakonda	12 June 2024	Incumbent	2 years, 121 days	2024 (16th)	Telugu Desam Party	Naidu IV	N. Chandrababu Naidu	
