= K. E. Madanna =

Indian politician

Kambalapadu Ediga Madanna (28 May 1902 – 5 May 1994), well known as K.E. Madanna, was a social activist and political leader who fought against the Rayalaseema factionists and forward castes dominations in Kurnool district of Andhra Pradesh in India to bring social change and political awareness among the oppressed and weaker sections of the Rayalaseema people, particularly among Backward Castes, Muslims, Scheduled Castes, and Scheduled Tribes during both pre-independence and post-independence period of India.

== Family ==
K. E. Madanna was born on 28 May 1902 at Kambalapadu village of Dhone mandal in Kurnool district, Andhra Pradesh.

He later married and had four sons, Two are members of Legislative Assembly, K. E. Krishnamurthy from Dhone assembly constituency and another being K. E. Prabhakar from Pattikonda assembly constituency & also worked as a cabinet minister in the Telugu Desam Party government.

He died on 5 May 1994.

== Political career ==
He was elected as a District Board member in 1938, a position equivalent to the post-Indian independence role of Zilla Parishad Director. In order to advance his aims further he then moved from Dhone to Kurnool. From his new base he assisted the oppressed weaker sections of society. This brought enmity and resistance from factionists and forward castes who tried to prevent him reaching the weaker sections through all means to an extent of killing his supporters and scaring him with the same fatality.

After independence he contested the 1967 legislative assembly elections for Andhra Pradesh from Kurnool assembly constituency. These he won, and thus became MLA for Kurnool assembly on Indian National Congress political party.

In 1972 he got elected to Legislative Council of Andhra Pradesh. He also worked as president for Kurnool district Indian National Congress party till he retired from active politics in 1978.

He supported Damodaram Sanjivayya in the latter's successful campaign to become the first chief minister of Andhra Pradesh to have come from a Scheduled Caste. Sanjivayya was a close political associate and friend of K.E. Madanna along with fellow contemporary friends and associates who were Pendekanti Venkata Subbaiah, Narsappa, and B. V. Subbareddy.
