= Vasikeri Gopinath =

Indian politician

Member of Legislative Assembly
- In office 1989–1994
- Preceded by: Gurram Narayanappa
- Succeeded by: Payyavula Keshav
- Constituency: Uravakonda

Personal details
- Born: Uravakonda, Andhra Pradesh, India
- Party: Indian National Congress
- Spouse: Australia

Vasikeri Gopinath also known as V. Gopinath is an Indian politician from Andhra Pradesh, India. He is the leader of the Indian National Congress and has won once as an MLA from the Uravakonda constituency.

== Career ==
In 1985, he contested as MLA candidate from Uravakonda, but he lost to Gurram Narayanappa of Telugu Desam Party. In 1989, he won as MLA defeating same opponent with 16642 majority.
