= Ahmed Ali Khan =

Indian businessman and politician

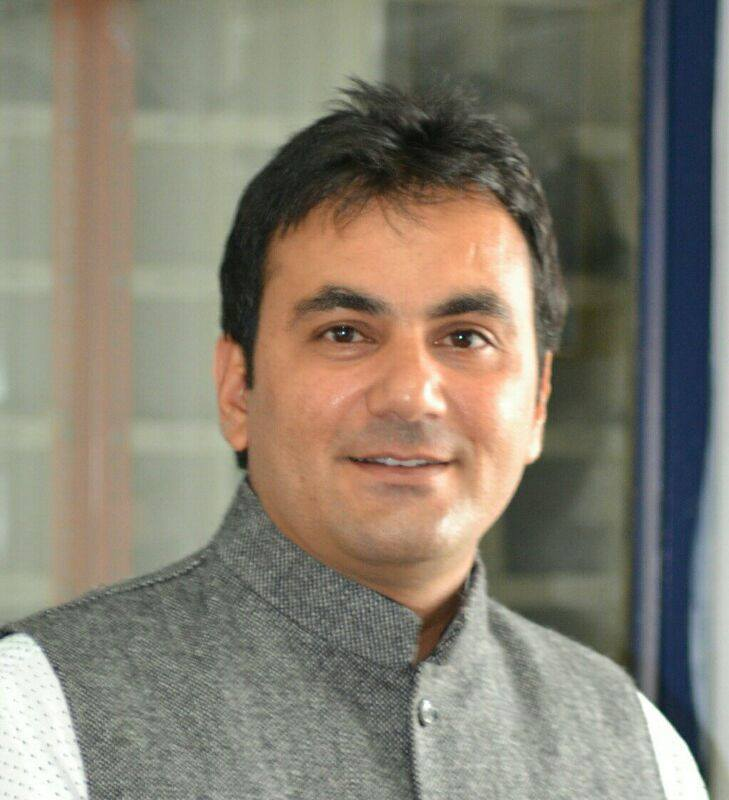
- Constituency: Kurnool

Personal details
- Born: Ahmed Ali Khan; 4 May 1977 (age 49) Kurnool, Kurnool district, Andhra Pradesh
- Party: Indian National Congress
- Education: B.Com Computers, Osmania College Kurnool.

Ahmed Ali Khan (born 4 May 1977) is an Indian businessman and politician. He is contesting from Congress party for Kurnool, Andhra Pradesh. He is a well-known person who is popular for public service.

== Early life ==
Ahmed Ali Khan has been described as being one of the good businessman in the Kurnool. He was born to Mehmood Ali Khan on 4 May 1977 in Kurnool, Kurnool district, Andhra Pradesh, and has a B.Com degree from Osmania College, Kurnool (1998–99).

== Business career ==
Ahmed Ali Khan has been an MSA Motors Kurnool dealer since 1998. Now he is the Director of MSA Motors. He has the other businesses that are MSA Traders and Kamal Enterprises.

== Political career ==
Ahmed Ali Khan is an All India Congress Committee member. He is playing a role as Kurnool city Assembly incharge and also he is a Chairman of Minority Department Andhra Pradesh Congress Committee.

Ahmed Ali Khan had participated in the Kurnool constituency as an Indian National Congress Party (INC) candidate in the 2014 state assembly elections.
