= Silver Jubilee Government Degree College =

College in Kurnool, India

Silver Jubilee Government Degree College (Autonomous)
- సిల్వర్ జూబిలీ డిగ్రీ కళాశాల
- Type: Government institution
- Established: 1972
- Affiliations: Cluster University, Kurnool
- Principal: Dr. G. Srinivas
- Location: Kurnool, Andhra Pradesh, India, Kurnool, Andhra Pradesh, India
- Campus: Urban
- Nickname: sjgc kurnool
- Website: http://www.sjgckurnool.edu.in

Silver Jubilee Government College is located in B- Camp, Kurnool, Andhra Pradesh, India. It was established on the occasion of Silver Jubilee Celebrations of independence India.

It was established in 1972 by the government of Andhra Pradesh. Both male and female students from Andhra Pradesh are admitted after passing an entrance test.

In the 2018 national government Ministry of Human Resource Development National Institutional Ranking Framework, the college was ranked 35th among colleges in India and first in the state of Andhra Pradesh. In the 2019 rankings, the college fell to 66th place in its category. In 2020, it was placed in the 101-150 rank band for colleges. In 2021, 2022, and 2023, it participated in the NIRF, but was not ranked.

It was the brain child of Sri. P.V. Narasimha Rao, then Chief Minister of Andhra Pradesh and Sri M. V. Rajagopal, I.A.S., the then Director and Secretary of Education, government of Andhra Pradesh. With the background of separatist movements, they had a dream of establishing a statewide educational institution to promote regional reconciliation, by admitting students from all the three regions of the state, the coastal Andhra, Telangana and Rayalaseema. They wanted to provide an atmosphere free from financial worries by providing free boarding, free lodging and free coaching. Their dream materialized and took shape in the form of Silver Jubilee Government College, a residential degree college, located in Kurnool, the first capital of Andhra Pradesh. The students were admitted from all the three regions of the state, coastal Andhra, Telangana and Rayalaseema in the ratio of 42:36:22, on merit basis through a statewide entrance test.

The University Grants Commission, New Delhi, conferred Autonomy in 2005. The National Accreditation and Assessment Council, Bangalore, has examined the academic and infra-structural facilities and awarded an "A" grade. The college has introduced vocational courses like Industrial Chemistry, Pharmaceutical Chemistry, Microbiology, Biochemistry, Computer science, and Travel and Tourism. Postgraduate courses in English, Telugu and Physics, Chemistry, Mathematics and Economics have been started. Jawahar Knowledge Centre train the students in communication skills, spoken English and software basics.

In 2015, the Union Ministry of Human Resource Development sanctioned the creation of a cluster university including Silver Jubilee Government Degree College (Autonomous), K.V.R. Government College for Women (Autonomous) and the Government Degree College for Men.

In 2022, due to the college's dilapidated physical condition, the government of Andhra Pradesh committed funding to building a new campus on a 50-acre site on Jagannatha Gattu. A cornerstone for the new building was laid by the state finance minister Buggana Rajendranath Reddy, education minister Audimulapu Suresh, and others.

The college also has co-curricular activities and organisations like NSS, NCC, sports, gym facilities for all the students.

== Academics ==
The college offers arts, commerce and science courses.

=== Bachelor Of Science (B.Sc) ===
- Mathematics, Physics, Chemistry
- Mathematics, Physics, Computer Science
- Mathematics, Physics, web technologies
- Zoology, Biotechnology, Chemistry & Botany, zoology Chemistry
- Botany, Microbiology, Chemistry
- Botany, Biotechnology, Chemistry
- Botany, Horticulture, chemistry

=== Bachelor of Commerce (B.com) ===
- computers
- General

=== Bachelor of Arts (B.A) ===
- History, Economics, Political Science English & Telugu medium

Postgraduate courses

- M.A Telugu, English, Economics
- M.Sc Maths, Physics, Chemistry
- M.Com
