= Butta Renuka =

Indian politician

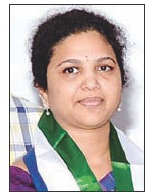

Member of Parliament from Kurnool, Andhra Pradesh
- In office 2014–2019
- Preceded by: Kotla Jayasurya Prakasha Reddy
- Succeeded by: Sanjeev Kumar

Personal details
- Born: 21 June 1971 (age 55)
- Party: YSR Congress Party
- Other political affiliations: Telugu Desam Party
- Spouse: Butta Neelakantam
- Children: 3
- Education: Dr. B.R. Ambedkar Open University

Butta Renuka is an Indian politician from Andhra Pradesh. She is a member of the Yuvajana Sramika Rythu Congress. Her husband Butta Neelakantam is the leader of the Yuvajana Sramika Rythu Congress. She is one of the richest parliamentarians with total assets of more than 300 crores.

== Biography ==
She hails from Pullagummi near Kurnool. She did her graduation from Dr. B.R. Ambedkar Open University and is also a member of chenetha community or Kurni Nesi a.k.a Kuruhinashetty.

== Career ==
In 2014, she won the 2014 Indian general election in Andhra Pradesh and became an MP for 16th Lok Sabha. On 1 September 2014, she became a member of the Committee on Empowerment of Women, Standing Committee on Rural Development, Consultative Committee, and Ministry of Human Resource Development. By 2015 she became a member of the General Body of the Central Social Welfare Board. In 2017, she became a member of the Central Supervisory Board.

YSRCP nominated her for the Yemmiganur seat for the 2024 Andhra Pradesh Legislative Assembly election.
