= Kangati Sreedevi =

Indian politician

Member of Legislative Assembly Andhra Pradesh
- In office 2019–2024
- Preceded by: K. E. Krishna Murthy
- Succeeded by: K. E. Shyam Babu
- Constituency: Pattikonda

Personal details
- Party: YSR Congress Party
- Spouse: K. Narayana Reddy

Kangati Sreedevi (born 1973) is an Indian politician from Andhra Pradesh. She was elected to the Andhra Pradesh Legislative Assembly from Pattikonda Assembly constituency as a member of the YSR Congress Party.

== Early life and education ==
Sreedevi was born in Burugula village Veldurthi mandal, Kurnool district.

== Career ==
Sreedevi won the 2019 Andhra Pradesh Legislative Assembly election defeating K. E. Shyam Kumar of Telugu Desam Party by a margin of 42,065 votes.

Her husband, Kangati Narayana Reddy of Cherukulapadu village, was murdered. She has been nominated again by YSR Congress Party to contest from Pattikonda seat in the 2024 Andhra Pradesh Legislative Assembly election.
