= Sanjeev Kumar (Andhra Pradesh politician) =

Member of 17th lok Sabha

Member of Parliament, Lok Sabha
- In office 23 May 2019 – 4 June 2024
- Preceded by: Butta Renuka
- Succeeded by: Bastipati Nagaraju Panchalingala
- Constituency: Kurnool

Personal details
- Born: 3 January 1967 (age 59)
- Party: YSR Congress Party (Until 2024)

Sanjeev Kumar is an Indian politician. He is a member of the 17th Lok Sabha, represented Kurnool constituency of Andhra Pradesh. He was previously a member of the YSR Congress Party.

Sanjeev Kumar quit the party after being denied a ticket from Kurnool for the 2024 Lok Sabha polls and was removed as YSRCP party in-charge of the Kurnool Lok Sabha constituency days after he announced his resignation from the party's primary membership and also to MP Post on 10 January 2024.
