= Y. Gadilingana Goud =

Indian politician (1909–1974)

Y. Gadiligana Goud
- Born: October 1, 1909
- Died: April 18, 1974 (aged 64)
- Occupation: politician

Y. Gadilingana Goud (1 October 1909 – 18 April 1974) was twice a member of the Parliament of India. He was the member of 1st Lok Sabha and 4th Lok Sabha of India.

He represented Kurnool parliamentary constituency of Andhra Pradesh twice as member of parliament. He got elected to the 1st Lok Sabha (1952–57) as a representative of the Praja Socialist Party and to the 4th Lok Sabha (1967–71) from the Swatantra Party, respectively.

== Personal life ==
He was born in 1909.

== Political career ==
Goud was elected as President of Gudikal Union Board at the age of 17 in 1926 and held that position till 1953. He defeated H. Sitaram Reddy, Minister of Revenue and Industries in the then Composite state of Madras with a majority of 45,000 votes. He also held various posts of public importance like

- Vice President of District Educational Council, Bellary.
- Secretary of Cooperative Union, Adoni.
- Joint Secretary of Provincial Union of Panchayats, Madras for 6 years.
- Member of Taluk Board, Adoni.
- President of Cooperative Marketing Society Ltd., Adoni.
- President of Kurnool District Cooperative Societies Union.
- President of Kunool district Swatantra Party.
- Member of Irrigation Advisory Committee.
- Member of T.B project, Kurnool.
- Member of Executive Committee, Kurnool District Cooperative Marketing Society Ltd., Kurnool.
- Got elected as M.P to enter 1st Lok Sabha between 1952 and 1957.
- Joint Secretary of Swatantra Party between 1966 and 1968.
- Elected as MP for the 4th Lok Sabha.
