= Gargeyapuram =

- village
- Interactive map of Gargeyapuram
- Location in Andhra Pradesh, India Gargeyapuram (India)
- Coordinates: 15.7796°N 78.1456°E
- Country: India
- State: Andhra Pradesh
- District: Kurnool

Population (2009)
  - Total: 7,228

Languages
  - Official: Telugu
- Time zone: UTC+5:30 (IST)

Gargeyapuram is a village in Kurnool district, Andhra Pradesh, India. It is located 12 km from Kurnool. It is only accessible by road.

The village is the site of a major Vedic religious ritual for the renewal of nature.

== Demographics ==
As of the 2011 Census, Gargeyapuram has a population of 7,561 people in 1,643 families. There are 3,798 males (50.2%) and 3,753 females (49.8%). In 2011, the literacy rate was 65.07%, which is lower than the state average.
