= Indian Institute of Information Technology, Design and Manufacturing, Kurnool =

Public University in Andhra Pradesh, India

Indian Institute of Information Technology Design and Manufacturing Kurnool
- Type: Public
- Established: 2015
- Chairman: H. A. Ranganath
- Director: B. S. Murthy
- Students: 1000
- Location: Kurnool, Andhra Pradesh, India
- Campus: 151 acres
- Website: www.iiitk.ac.in

The Indian Institute of Information Technology Design and Manufacturing Kurnool (IIITDM Kurnool) is a technical education institute in the field of Information Technology established by MHRD, Government of India in 2015. The institute started functioning at its permanent campus of in Kurnool.

== History ==
IIITDM Kurnool was established in 2015 by the Ministry of Human Resource Development (MHRD) as part as the government obligation under the Andhra Pradesh Reorganisation Act, 2014. The Indian Institutes of Information Technology (Amendment) Act, 2017 granted Institutes of National Importance (INI) status to the institute in August 2017.

== Admission ==
Admission to the undergraduate program is based on the All India Rank obtained in the JEE Main examination conducted by National Testing Agency (NTA). This institute Also Offers PhD program And also M.Tech Courses through GATE 2023 Rank.

COURSES OFFERED:

1.Computer Science and Engineering

2.Electronics and Communication Engineering with specialization in Design and Manufacturing

3.Mechanical Engineering with specialization in Design and Manufacturing

4.Artificial Intelligence and Data Science

5.Computer Science and Engineering (Dual Degree, 5 Years)

6.Electronics and Communication Engineering(Dual Degree, 5 Years)

7. Mechanical Engineering (Dual Degree, 5Years)
