= Kurnool =

Kurnool Kandanavōlu (Kandanōlu)
- City
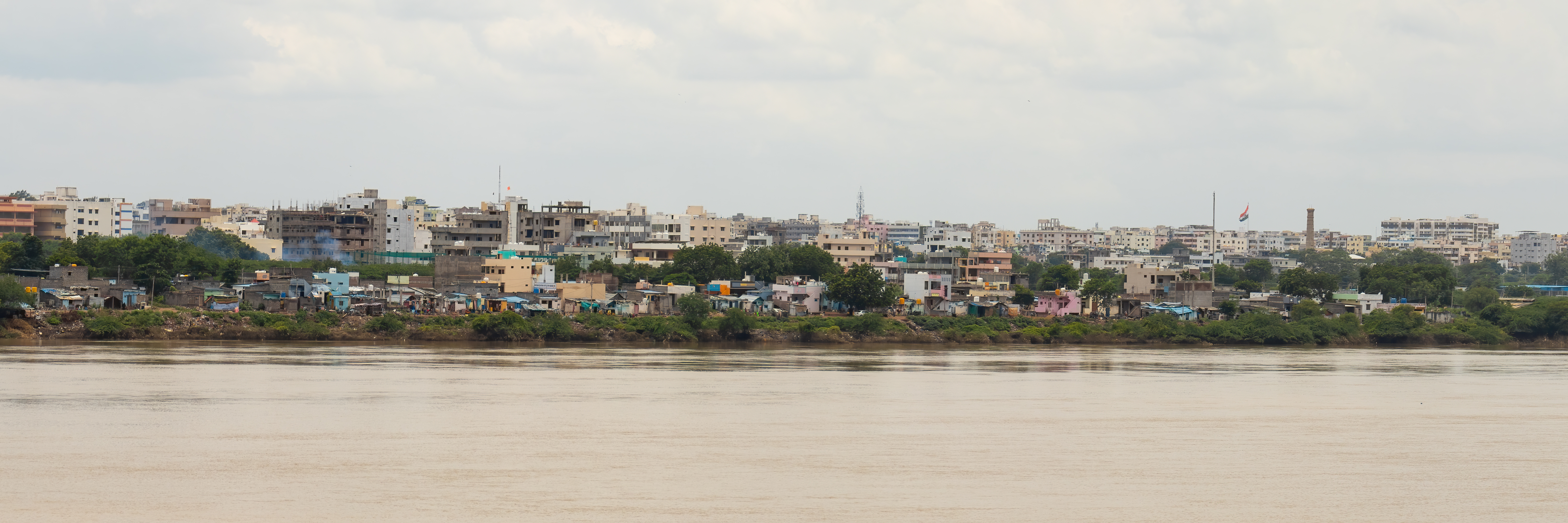
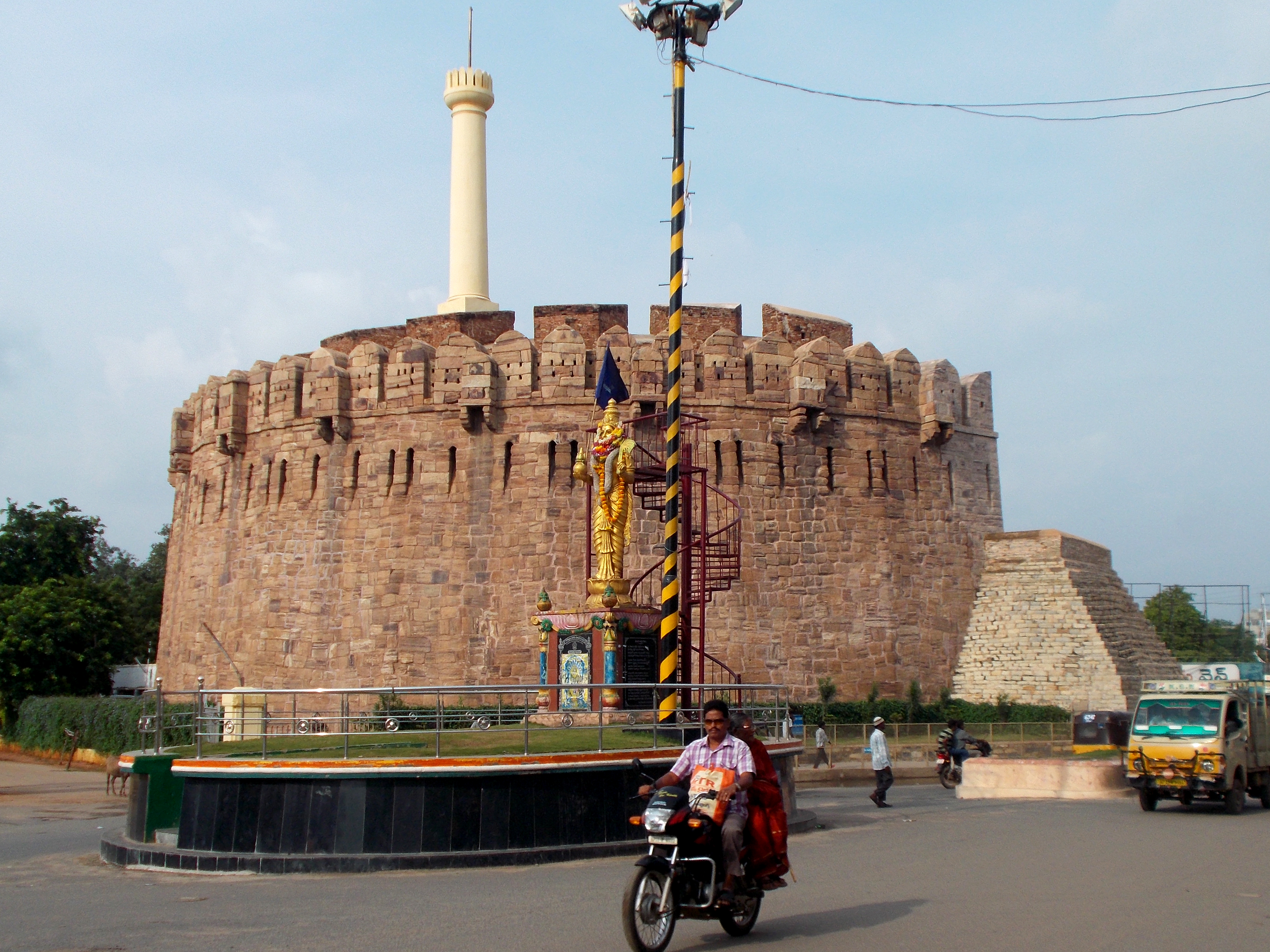
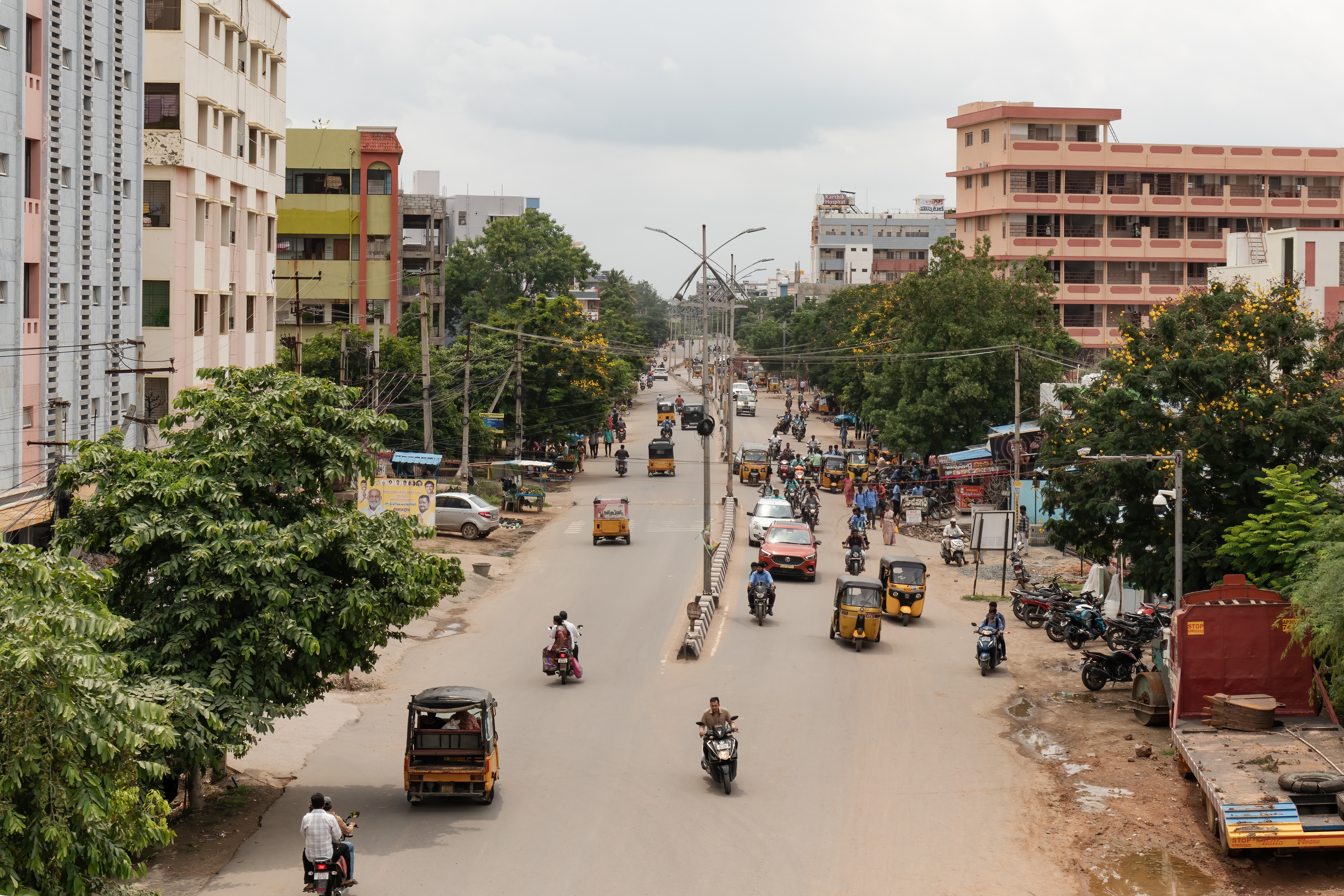
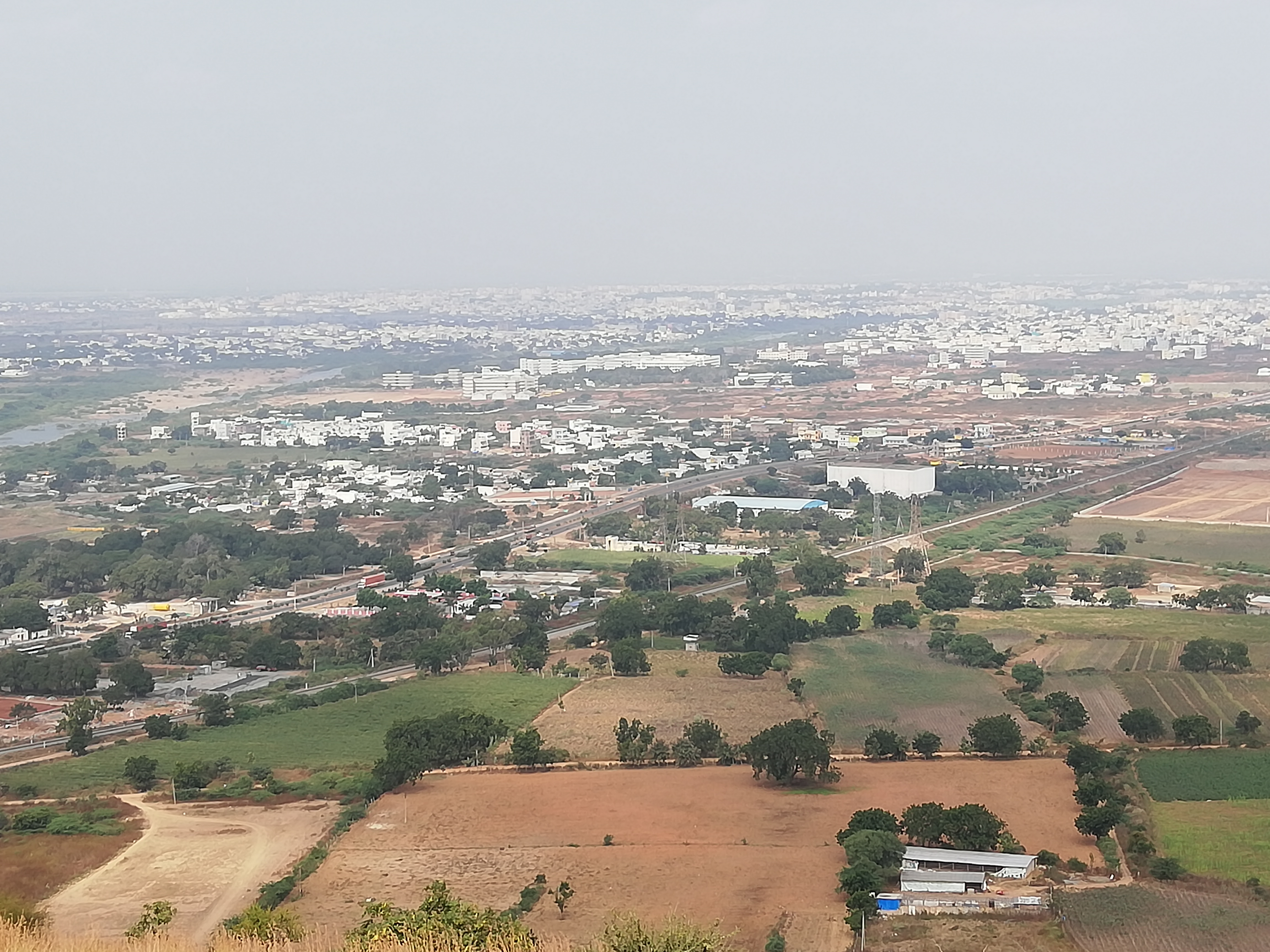
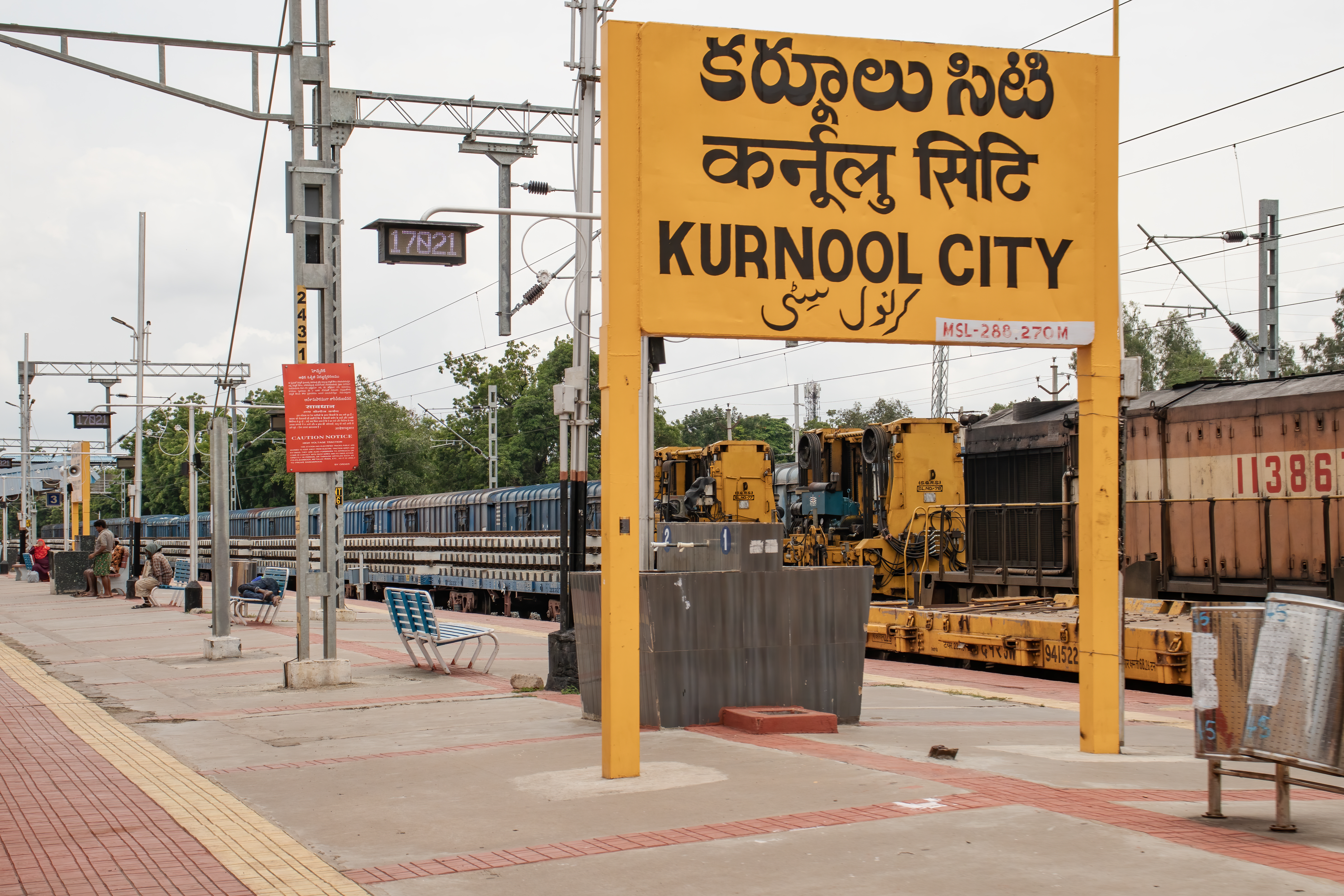
- Clockwise from top: Skyline of Kurnool from Tungabhadra River Bridge, Pumphouse road in Kurnool, Kurnool Railway station, Kurnool City from Jagannatha Gattu and Kondareddy Buruju
- Nickname: The Gateway of Rayalaseema
- Interactive map of Kurnool
- Location in Andhra Pradesh and in India Kurnool (India)
- Coordinates: 15.83°N 78.05°E
- Country: India
- State: Andhra Pradesh
- Region: Rayalaseema
- District: Kurnool

Government
  - Type: Municipal corporation
  - Body: Kurnool Municipal Corporation
  - Mayor: Vacant (since 18 March 2026)
  - MLA: T. G. Bharath
  - MP: Bastipati Nagaraju Panchalingala

Area
  - Total: 129.2 km^{2} (49.9 sq mi)
  - Rank: 107
- Elevation: 274 m (899 ft)

Population (2011)
  - Total: 425,214
  - Rank: 109th (India); 5th (Andhra Pradesh)
  - Density: 3,291/km^{2} (8,524/sq mi)
- Demonym: Kurnoolian

Languages
  - Official: Telugu
- Time zone: UTC+5:30 (IST)
- PIN: 518001, 518002, 518003, 518004, 518005, 518006, 518007
- Vehicle registration: AP-21
- Website: Kurnool Municipal Corporation

Kurnool is a city in the state of Andhra Pradesh, India. It formerly served as the capital of Andhra State (1953–1956). The city is often referred to as "The Gateway of Rayalaseema". Kurnool is also famous for Diamond hunting as diamonds can be found in the barren land of Kurnool after the top layers of soil are washed away by the monsoon rains. It also serves as the district headquarters of its Kurnool district. As of 2011 census, it is the fifth most populous city in the state with a population of 425,214. It is located on the banks of the Tungabhadra river. Although the area has been inhabited for thousands of years, modern Kurnool was founded in the 16th century CE with the construction of the Konda Reddy Fort.

== Etymology ==
The original name of Kurnool is found in historical records as Kandanavōlu or Kandanōlu. It used to be a crossing on the Tungabhadra River, where the bullock cart caravans are believed to have greased their wheels ("kandana" being a reference to grease). The city is often referred to as "The Gateway of Rayalaseema".

== History ==
=== Palaeolithic era ===
The Ketavaram rock paintings from the Palaeolithic era and are 18 kilometres from Kurnool. Also the Jurreru Valley, Katavani Kunta and Yaganti in Kurnool District have some important rock art and paintings in the vicinity that may be dated from 35,000 to 40,000 years ago.

Ashoka's rock edicts were inscribed in the 3rd century BCE. The inscription is in Prakrit language and Brahmi script. Both the major and minor edits are found at Erragudi (also called the Yerragudi or Jonnagiri site). These are among the oldest discovered inscriptions in India. The site is close to the Andhra-Karnataka border, in Kurnool district. It is an ASI protected site under Indian law.

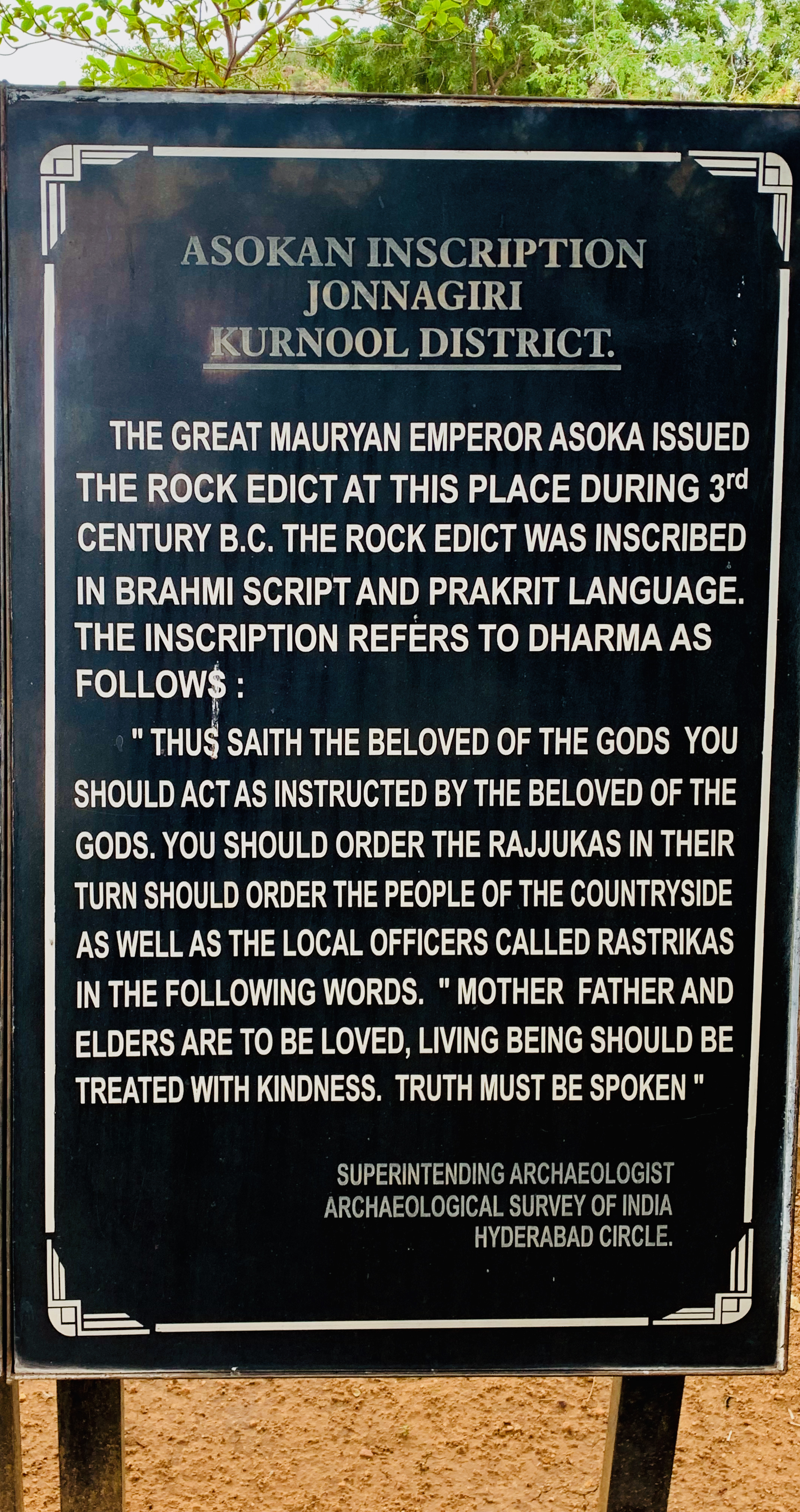
ASI board Kurnool

Belum Caves are geologically and historically important caves in the district. There are indications that Jain and Buddhist monks were occupying these caves centuries ago. Many Buddhists relics were found inside the caves. These relics are now housed in the Museum at Ananthapur. The Archaeological Survey of India (ASI) found remnants of vessels and other artifacts of the pre-Buddhist era and has dated the remnants of vessels found in the caves to 4500 BC.

=== Vijayanagara era ===
Kurnool town was Ruled by Chalukyas of Badami and Rashtrakutas before the 11th century. The earliest knowledge of this settlement dates from the 11th century. It has developed as a transit place on the southern banks of the river Tungabhadra.

Ruled by the Chalukya in the 12th century and later taken over by the Kakatiya dynasty in the 13th century, Kurnool developed into a transit point on the southern banks of the Tungabhadra River. It eventually fell under the rule of a jaghirdar before becoming a part of the Vijayanagar dynasty. King Achyuta Raya, successor of Sri Krishnadeva Raya constructed the Kurnool Fort during the 16th century.

=== Nawabs ===
The Abyssinian, Abdul Wahab Khan, defeated King Gopal Raja of the Vijayanagar Kingdom in the 17th century and went on to rule the land for 16 years until his death.

In 1686, Kurnool fell under the influence of the Mughals who were ruled by Emperor Aurangzeb. Later on in Kurnool's history, it was ruled by the Nawabs until the British Government took over in 1839.

=== British Rule ===
Ghulam Rasul Khan Bahadur (died on 12 July 1840) was the last Nawab of Kurnool, Andhra Pradesh. He ruled from 1823 to 1839 until the kingdom was defeated by the East India Company. On 12 October 1839, a war broke out between the British Indian Army and the kingdom and continued for six days until the king was detained on 18 October. He was subsequently sent to Tiruchirappalli Central Prison where he died on 12 July 1840.

=== After independence ===
Kurnool was the capital of erstwhile Andhra State between 1 October 1953 and 31 October 1956. The state was later merged with the Telugu-speaking districts of Hyderabad State to form Andhra Pradesh with Hyderabad as the state's capital on 1 November 1956. Currently Kurnool is in the divided Andhra Pradesh state.

== Geography ==
Kurnool is located at 15.8333°N 78.05°E. It has an average elevation of 273 metres (898 feet). Kurnool lies on the banks of the Tungabhadra River. The Hundri and Neeva rivers also flow through the city. The K.C.Canal (Kurnool–Cuddapah) was built by the Dutch for transportation, but later used for irrigation.

=== Cityscape ===
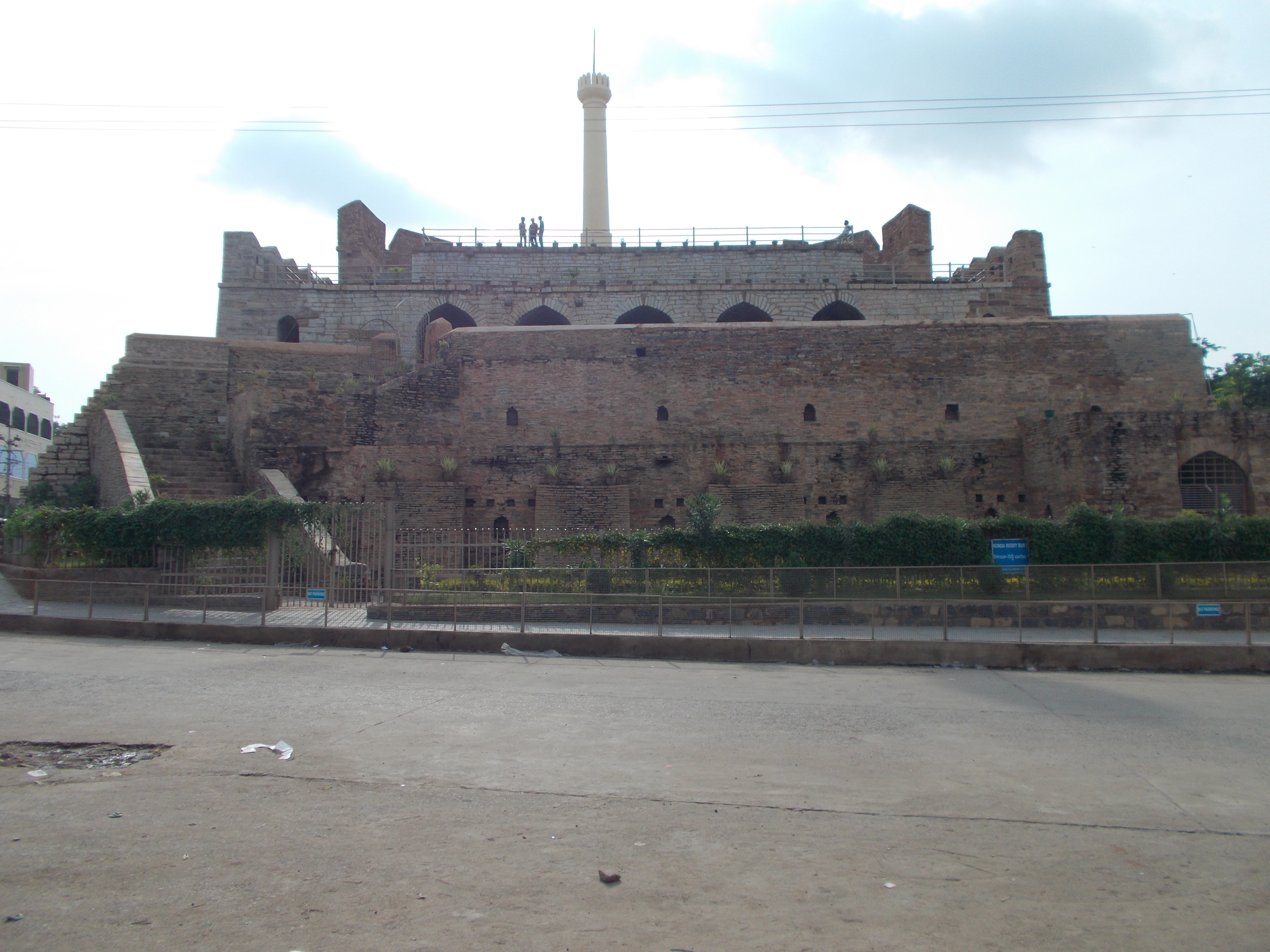
Front View of Kondareddy Buruju.

Landmarks in and around the city include Konda Reddy Fort Formerly called Kondareddy Burj is the historical monument and major tourist attraction of Kurnool located at the northeast part of the city. Orvakal rock Garderns is the sculpture garden with an ancient cave lying on the southeast of the city. Jagannatha Gattu Temple is a popular tourist site of Kurnool. It is famous for its Lord Shiva Temple and is located in B. Thandrapadu, in Kurnool. The history behind the Linga makes it a popular destination.

=== Climate ===
Kurnool has a tropical savanna climate bordering on hot semi arid climate (Köppen BSh) with temperatures ranging from 26 °C (78.8 °F) to 43 °C (109.4 °F) in the summer and 12 °C (53.6 °F) to 31 °C (87.8 °F) in the winter. The average annual rainfall is about 810 millimetres (32 in).Kurnool city gets decent to good share of rains from pre-monsoon to monsoon seasons. City location is influenced by the orography effect of Nallamala hills in the east. August and September are the rainiest months and February is the driest month. The highest amount of rainfall ever recorded in 24 hours is 386mm in the month of June 1989 and marking the rainiest month of all time with 527mm.

Climate data for Kurnool (1991–2020, extremes 1901–2020)
Month	Jan	Feb	Mar	Apr	May	Jun	Jul	Aug	Sep	Oct	Nov	Dec	Year
Record high °C (°F)	37.3 (99.1)	39.9 (103.8)	43.3 (109.9)	45.6 (114.1)	45.9 (114.6)	45.6 (114.1)	39.9 (103.8)	39.3 (102.7)	38.7 (101.7)	38.4 (101.1)	36.8 (98.2)	35.5 (95.9)	45.9 (114.6)
Mean daily maximum °C (°F)	32.5 (90.5)	34.9 (94.8)	38.1 (100.6)	40.5 (104.9)	39.8 (103.6)	35.8 (96.4)	33.7 (92.7)	32.8 (91.0)	32.8 (91.0)	32.8 (91.0)	31.5 (88.7)	30.5 (86.9)	34.7 (94.5)
Daily mean °C (°F)	24.8 (76.6)	27.4 (81.3)	31.0 (87.8)	34.0 (93.2)	33.7 (92.7)	30.6 (87.1)	28.6 (83.5)	28.2 (82.8)	28.0 (82.4)	27.6 (81.7)	26.1 (79.0)	24.2 (75.6)	28.7 (83.6)
Mean daily minimum °C (°F)	17.2 (63.0)	19.8 (67.6)	24.0 (75.2)	27.2 (81.0)	26.9 (80.4)	25.6 (78.1)	24.5 (76.1)	24.0 (75.2)	23.9 (75.0)	22.9 (73.2)	20.0 (68.0)	17.9 (64.2)	22.9 (73.2)
Record low °C (°F)	8.7 (47.7)	9.8 (49.6)	12.8 (55.0)	15.5 (59.9)	19.4 (66.9)	17.6 (63.7)	19.2 (66.6)	19.9 (67.8)	17.0 (62.6)	12.8 (55.0)	9.3 (48.7)	6.7 (44.1)	6.7 (44.1)
Average rainfall mm (inches)	4.7 (0.19)	2.9 (0.11)	9.8 (0.39)	30.1 (1.19)	62.0 (2.44)	102.7 (4.04)	131.9 (5.19)	152.0 (5.98)	154.1 (6.07)	130.6 (5.14)	30.8 (1.21)	3.8 (0.15)	815.6 (32.11)
Average rainy days	0.3	0.2	0.7	1.8	3.8	5.4	8.0	8.8	7.7	5.1	2.0	0.3	44.7
Average relative humidity (%) (at 17:30 IST)	41	29	30	32	39	50	60	64	63	58	52	46	49
Source 1: India Meteorological Department
Source 2: Tokyo Climate Center (mean temperatures 1991–2020)

Kurnool has been ranked 21st best “National Clean Air City” under (Category 2 3-10L Population cities) in India.

== Demographics ==
As per final data of the 2011 census, the Kurnool City had a population of 425,214, making it the fifth largest city in the state of Andhra Pradesh. The literacy rate of Kurnool was 77.37 per cent at the time of the 2011 census.

Literacy in Kurnool
All	77.37%
Male	83.01%
Female	71.24%

=== Religion ===
Religions in Kurnool city (2011)
Religion	Percent
Hinduism	67.20%
Islam	29.20%
Christianity	2.50%
Other or not stated	1.10%
Distribution of religions

As per final data of 2011 census, Hindus formed the majority in the Kurnool urban agglomeration. Other religious groups found in Kurnool are Muslims, Christians, and Jains.

=== Language ===
Languages of Kurnool City (2011)
1. Telugu (67.9%)
2. Urdu (28.2%)
3. Hindi (1.02%)
4. Others (2.90%)

Telugu (67.91%) is the official and most spoken language. Urdu (28.17%) and Hindi (1.02%) are also spoken.

== Government and politics ==
Kurnool serves as the district headquarters of its Kurnool district. The city is administered by Kurnool Municipal Corporation. State level Government institutions located in the city include:

- Andhra Pradesh Lokayukta
- Andhra Pradesh State Human Rights Commission
- Andhra Pradesh Electricity Regulatory Commission
- Andhra Pradesh State Wakf Tribunal, Kurnool
- CBI Court, Kurnool
- Government Regional Press, Kurnool

=== Villages ===
- Gargeyapuram

== Education ==
The primary and secondary school education is imparted by Government, aided and private schools of the School Education Department of the state. Notable institutions located in the city include:

- Dr. Abdul Haq Urdu University
- Indian Institute of Information Technology, Design and Manufacturing, Kurnool
- Kurnool Medical College
- Osmania College, Kurnool
- Rayalaseema University
- Silver Jubilee Government Degree College

== Transport ==
=== Roadways ===
National Highway 44 (India) which runs from Srinagar to Kanyakumari and also highway of Bangalore to Hyderabad. passes through Kurnool.

National highway 340C [ Kurnool-Dornala ] which connects to Srisailam, Vinukonda, Guntur, Vijayawada.

National Highway 40, [ Rayalaseema Expressway ] which runs from Kurnool to Chittoor, are the major highways passing through the city.

Surat–Chennai Expressway which is under construction also passes through the city outskirts.

The city also has an Outer Ring Road which is under construction connecting from Gargeyapuram National Highway 340C (India) and connects National Highway 40 (India), National Highway 44 (India), under construction Surat–Chennai Expressway and Kurnool - Bellari State Highway.

The city has a total road length of 519.22 km State owned bus transport system, APSRTC, operates buses from Kurnool bus station to other parts of the state.

=== Railways ===
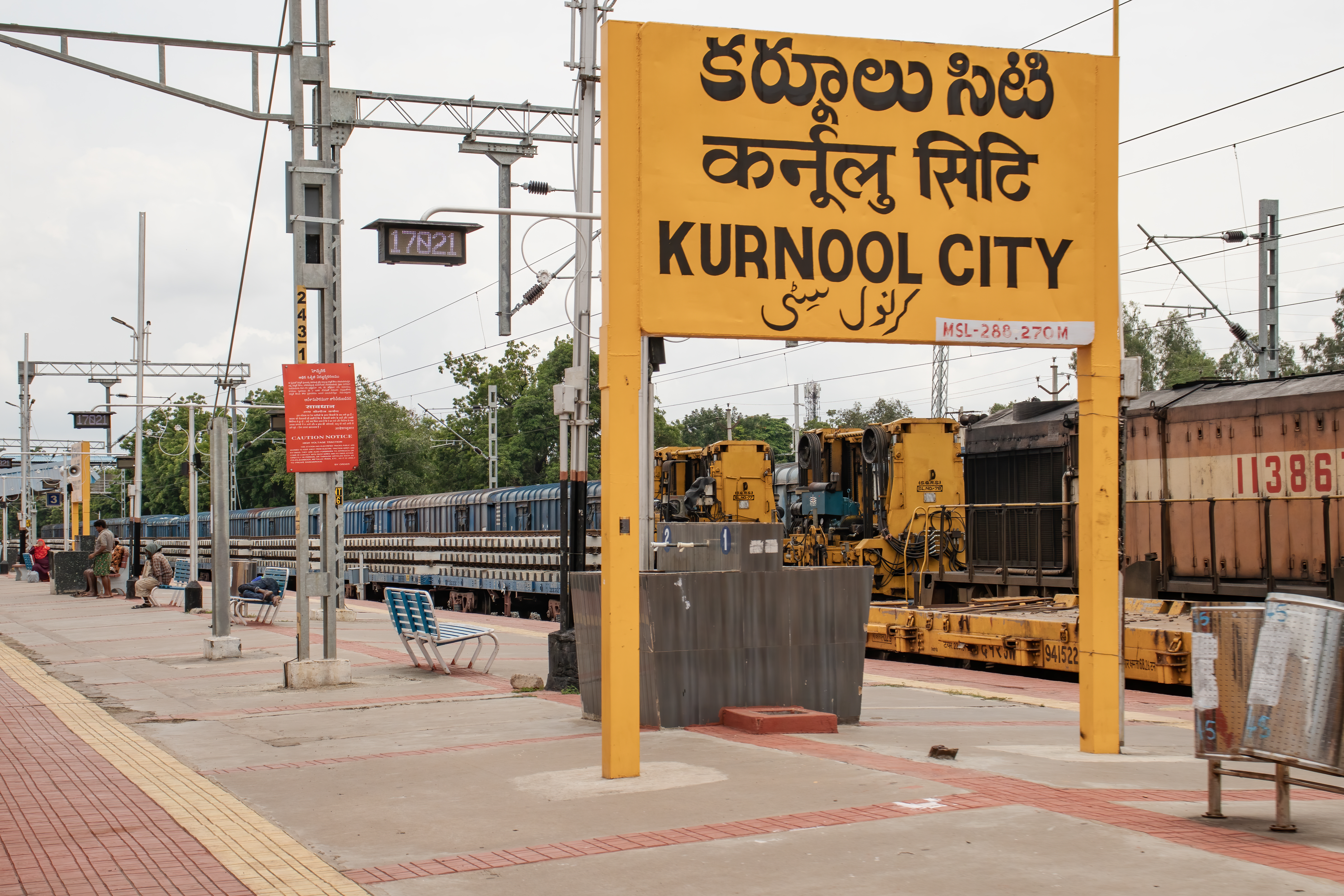
Kurnool City Railway Station board

Kurnool City railway station lies on the Bengaluru – Hyderabad railway line. It is classified as an A–category station in the Hyderabad railway division of South Central Railway zone. Another railway station name Kotla lies in the middle of the city.

=== Airport ===
Kurnool Airport, officially known as Uyyalawada Narasimha Reddy Airport, is located at Orvakal and is situated on the National Highway 40, about 18 km (11 mi) from Kurnool and 54 km (34 mi) from Nandyal. Commercial operations of the greenfield airport were started in March 2021.

== Economy ==
The GDP of Kurnool City is $3.266 Billion.

Kurnool is endowed with good mineral resources. The important minerals are iron ore, dolomite, limestone, ochre, quartz and silica.

== Notable people ==
- Abdul Hafeez Khan, Former MLA Kurnool, YSRCP
- K. E. Krishnamurthy, former Deputy Chief Minister, Andhra Pradesh
- Arcot Ramasamy Mudaliar - Founder of Justice party, Diwan of Mysore and the First President of UNESCO
- Kotla Jayasurya Prakasha Reddy, former member of parliament and Union minister, Railways
- Kotla Vijaya Bhaskara Reddy, former Chief Minister, United Andhra Pradesh
- Damodaram Sanjivayya, former Chief Minister, United Andhra Pradesh
- Machani Somappa, industrialist and recipient of Padma sri honour
- T. G. Venkatesh, Indian businessman and politician

== See also ==
- List of cities in Andhra Pradesh by population
- List of Urban Agglomerations in Andhra Pradesh
- List of municipal corporations in Andhra Pradesh
