= Machani Somappa =

Indian industrialist

- Born: 1904; Yemmiganur, Kurnool, Madras Presidency, India
- Died: 1978 (aged 73–74) yemmiganur, Kurnool
- Occupations: Social worker, industrialist
- Awards: Padma Shri

Machani Somappa was an Indian industrialist, educationist, social worker and the founder of Machani Somappa group of companies. Born in 1904 at Yemmiganur in Kurnool district of the Madras Presidency, Somappa came to the fore during the famine of 1934 when he opened a relief centre for the famine hit weavers of his area and founded a cooperative society for the weavers, Yemmiganur Weavers Cooperative Society (YWCS), in 1938. Two years later, he set up the Machani Group and the business group has grown since 1940 to have interests in manufacturing, engineering, transport, agriculture, Information technology, energy, rural BPO, and retail brands. In 1960, he established Stumpp, Schuele and Somappa, a joint venture with renowned German spring manufacturers, Stumpp + Schuele. He had presence in educational field with the school he founded, Machani Somappa English Medium High School, in 1978. The Government of India honoured him in 1954, with the award of Padma Shri, the fourth highest Indian civilian award for his contributions to the society, placing him among the first recipients of the award.
