= Payyavula Keshav =

Indian politician (born 1965)

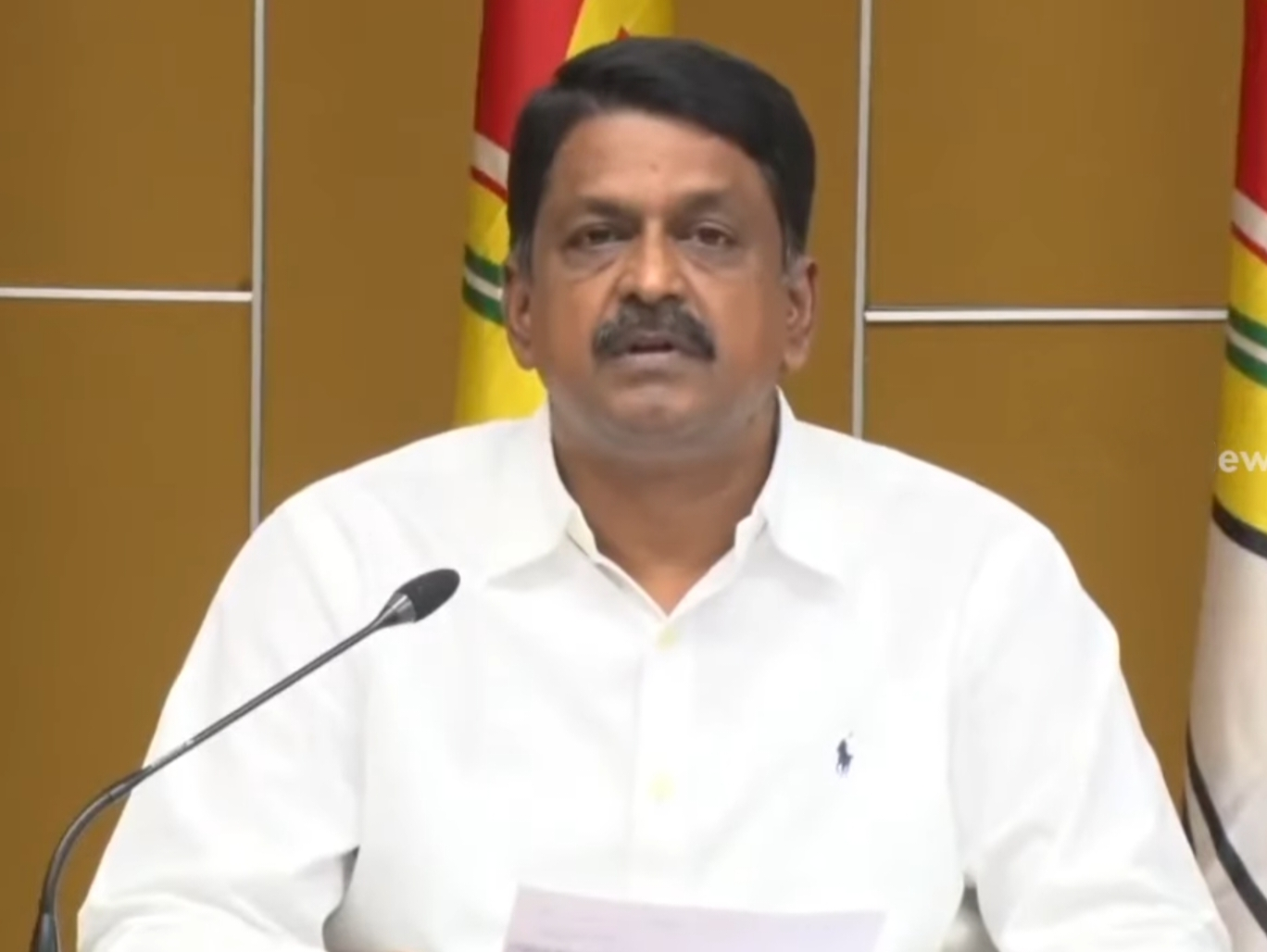

Minister of Finance, Planning, Commercial Taxes and Legislative Affairs Government of Andhra Pradesh
- Incumbent
- Assumed office 12 June 2024
- Governor: S. Abdul Nazeer
- Chief Minister: N. Chandrababu Naidu
- Preceded by: Buggana Rajendranath Reddy

Member of Legislative Council Andhra Pradesh
- In office 2015–2019
- Chairman: A. Chakrapani; N. M. D. Farooq
- Leader of the House: N. Chandrababu Naidu
- Constituency: Elected by Local Authorities

Member of Legislative Assembly Andhra Pradesh
- Incumbent
- Assumed office 23 May 2019
- Preceded by: Y. Visweswara Reddy
- Constituency: Uravakonda
- In office 11 May 2004 – 16 May 2014
- Preceded by: Yellareddy Gari Sivarama Reddy
- Succeeded by: Y. Visweswara Reddy
- Constituency: Uravakonda
- In office 5 December 1994 – 6 October 1999
- Preceded by: Vasikeri Gopinath
- Succeeded by: Yellareddy Gari Sivarama Reddy
- Constituency: Uravakonda

Personal details
- Born: 14 May 1965 (age 61) Bellary, Karnataka, India
- Party: Telugu Desam Party
- Spouse: P. Hemalatha
- Children: 2

Payyavula Keshav (born 14 May 1965) is a member of the Legislative Assembly of the Indian state of Andhra Pradesh representing the Uravakonda constituency of Anantapur. He is associated with the Telugu Desam Party and contested as an MLA six times from Uravakonda Assembly Constituency in the Rayalaseema region of Andhra Pradesh. He is currently serving as the cabinet minister in the Government of Andhra Pradesh.

== Early life and education ==
Keshav was born into a landlord family that owned more than 2000 acres till the land ceiling laws were enforced in independent India. His family was one of the richest in the Madras presidency. His father, Payyavula Venkata Narayana was elected as an MLA from Rayadurg constituency in 1975 and also served as the DCC President of the Indian National Congress party in Ananthapuram district. The family traditionally relied on agriculture as their main occupation. He was the younger son of his parents who had 2 sons and 5 daughters.

Keshav attended a local government school up to 10th grade and attended the Sri Sathya Sai School in Puttaparthi for 11th and 12th grades. Later, he joined the Bhadruka College in Hyderabad for his bachelor's degree. After his bachelor's, Keshav finished his post graduate diploma in management from T.A. Pai Management Institute, Manipal University, in 1987 at the age of 22.

Keshav is married to Ms Hemalatha and is blessed with two sons, Vikram Simha and Vijay Simha.

== Political career ==
Keshav's political career spans close to three decades in Telugu Desam Party. In 1994, he was chosen by the then TDP chief Nandamuri Taraka Ramarao to contest in the assembly elections at the age of 29, just a few months after his marriage. While his father contested from Rayadurg earlier, Keshav was allotted the seat of the Uravakonda constituency. Keshav won the elections of 1994 with a thumping majority of 17 thousand votes. In 1994 state assembly elections, TDP won 214 out of the total 294 seats in the assembly.

While Keshav contested six times from the Uravakonda seat, he was elected as an MLA four times. Notably, except during his first term as the MLA in 1994–99, TDP could not capture power in the state for him to wield his full hand. Keshav served the assembly and the people of his constituency as an opposition leader more than as a member of the ruling party.

=== As PAC Chairman ===
In the 2019 Assembly elections, Keshav won as an MLA from Uravakonda even when the whole of Andhra Pradesh voted decisively in favor of Jagan Mohan Reddy's YSRCP. Only three contestants from TDP won the election in the Rayalaseema region in 2019, the other two being the party chief Nara Chandra Babu Naidu and popular Telugu film actor Nandamuri Balakrishna. In July 2019, Keshav was appointed the chairman of Public Accounts Committee by the leader of the opposition Nara Chandra Babu Naidu.

As the PAC Chairman, Keshav raised issues related to public finances in the assembly and conducted several press conferences to bring issues to public notice. The issues primarily constituted the irregularities highlighted in CAG reports, the unconstitutionality of financing loans of Andhra Pradesh State Development Corporation through escrow agreements, and the unprecedented amount of borrowings of the state government. In July 2021, Keshav met the Governor of Andhra Pradesh to request a full-fledged audit of the state of public finances.

=== As MLA ===
Sl.no	Year	Assembly Constituency	Main Opponent	Votes	Difference	Result
1	1994	Uravakonda	Yellareddy Gari Sivarama Reddy (INC)	50306 - 32615	17691	Won
2	1999	Uravakonda	Yellareddy Gari Sivarama Reddy (INC)	45562 - 54063	8501	Lost
3	2004	Uravakonda	Y. Visweswara Reddy (CPI(ML) Liberation)	55756 - 47501	8255	Won
4	2009	Uravakonda	Y.Visweswara Reddy (INC)	64728 - 64499	229	Won
5	2014	Uravakonda	Y.Visweswara Reddy (YSRCP)	78767 - 81042	2275	Lost
6	2019	Uravakonda	Y.Visweswara Reddy (YSRCP)	90209 - 88077	2132	Won
7	2024	Uravakonda	Y.Visweswara Reddy (YSRCP)	102046 - 80342	21704	Won

2024 MLA Payyavula Kesav win to Telugu Desam Party

=== As MLC ===
Keshav lost the assembly elections in 2014 and contested an MLC seat in 2015 from Anantapur. After victory, he was appointed the chief whip on behalf of TDP in the Legislative Council.

S.no	Year	Constituency	Result
1	2015	Local Authorities (Anantapur)	Won

=== Notable political exigencies ===
==== Rift with People's War Group ====
As someone from a landlord family background, Keshav was the class enemy during phase 2 of left-wing extremism in India. In the 90s, Keshav's political career started with firm resistance from the People's War Group (PWG) in the region. The tiff-off between Keshav and the Naxalites culminated in two bomb attacks where two houses related to Keshav and his close relatives were blasted by the members of PWG. However, Keshav was not present at any of the blast scenes at the time of both incidents.

==== Samaikyandhra Movement ====
Keshav supported the Samaikyandhra movement during the political turmoil that culminated in carving out of Telangana as a separate state from the larger state of Andhra Pradesh in 2014.

==== Regional issues ====
Keshav has been an active proponent of water issues in the region as Rayalaseema lacks proper irrigation facilities for agriculture. On the political front, Keshav's relationship with Paritala Ravindra, a stalwart leader of TDP in the Anantapur region, has also been tested, owing to rumors about dominance in Anantapur.
