= Y. Visweswara Reddy =

Indian politician

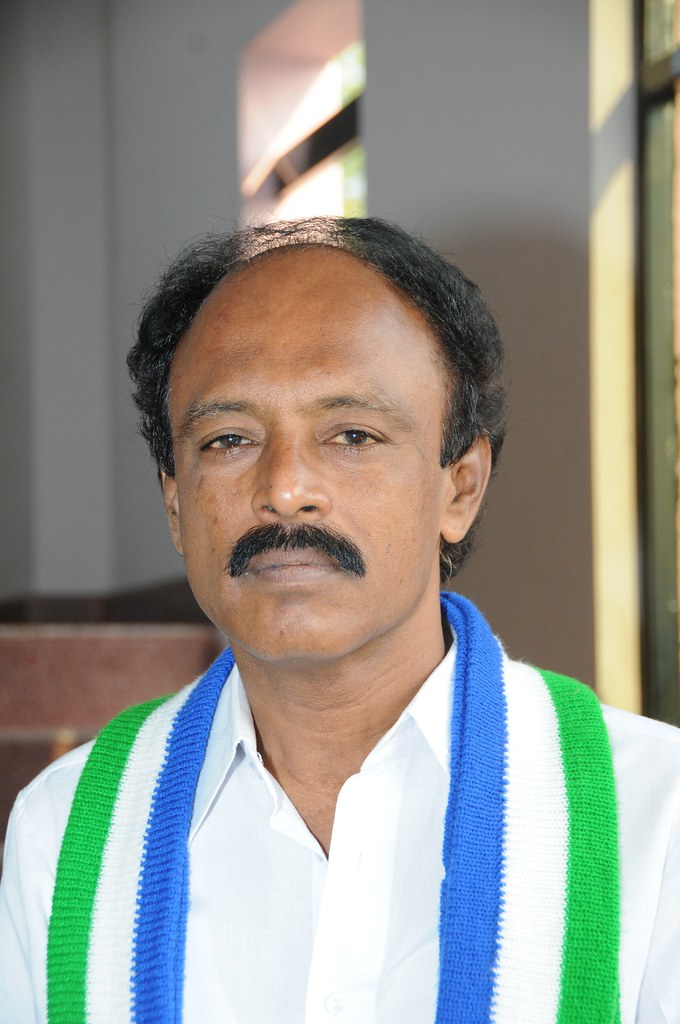

Member of Legislative Assembly Andhra Pradesh
- In office 2014–2019
- Preceded by: Payyavula Keshav
- Succeeded by: Payyavula Keshav
- Constituency: Uravakonda

Personal details
- Party: YSR Congress
- Education: MA
- Occupation: Politician

Y. Visweswara Reddy is politician and a member for YSR Congress Party (Yuvajana Shramika Rythu Congress Party) from Andhra Pradesh state of India. He was elected as a member of the Andhra Pradesh Legislative Assembly in the 2014 election from the Uravakonda constituency with a margin of less than 5000 votes. He had lost the same seat in the 2004 elections against Payyavula Keshav of Telugu Desam Party (TDP) while he was the member of Communist Party of India (Marxist) (CPI(M)) then.
