= Pattikonda Assembly constituency =

Constituency of the Andhra Pradesh Legislative Assembly, India

Coordinates: 15.40°N 77.50°E

Pattikonda
- Constituency No. 142 for the Andhra Pradesh Legislative Assembly
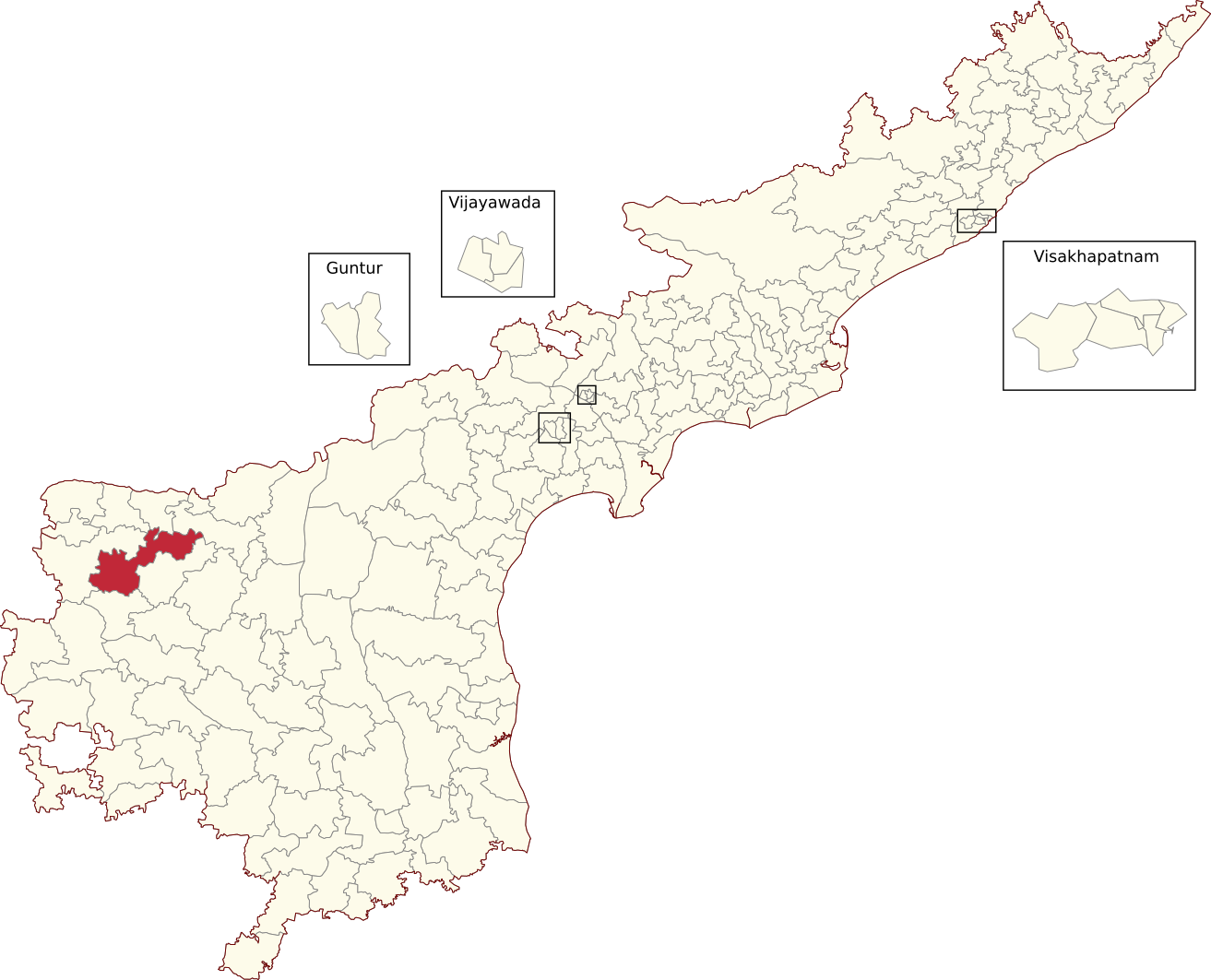
- Location of Pattikonda Assembly constituency within Andhra Pradesh

Constituency details
- Country: India
- Region: South India
- State: Andhra Pradesh
- District: Kurnool
- Lok Sabha constituency: Kurnool
- Established: 1951
- Total electors: 206,538
- Reservation: None

Member of Legislative Assembly
- 16th Andhra Pradesh Legislative Assembly
- Incumbent K. E. Shyam Kumar
- Party: TDP
- Alliance: NDA
- Elected year: 2024

Pattikonda Assembly constituency is a constituency in Kurnool district of Andhra Pradesh that elects represtatives to the Andhra Pradesh Legislative Assembly in India. It is one of the seven assembly segments of Kurnool Lok Sabha constituency.

K. E. Shyam Kumar is the current MLA of the constituency, having won the 2024 Andhra Pradesh Legislative Assembly election from Telugu Desam Party. As of 25 March 2019, there are a total of 206,538 electors in the constituency. The constituency was established in 1951, as per the Delimitation Orders (1951).

== Mandals ==
Mandal
Krishnagiri
Veldurthi
Pattikonda
Maddikera
Tuggali

Mandals in Pattikonda Assembly Constituency

== Members of the Legislative Assembly ==
Year	Member	Political party
1952	Lakshminarayana Reddy	Independent
1955	Hanumantha Reddy	Indian National Congress
1957	Lakshminarayana Reddy	Independent
1962	Narasi Reddy	Independent
1967	Narasi Reddy	Indian National Congress
1972	K. B. Narasappa	Indian National Congress
1978	Somandepalli Narayana Reddy	Indian National Congress
1983	M. Thamma Reddy	Indian National Congress
1985	Kuppa Mahabaleswara Gupta	Telugu Desam Party
1985	K. Subbarathnamma	Telugu Desam Party
1989	Patil Seshi Reddy	Indian National Congress
1994	Somula Venkat Subba Reddy	Telugu Desam Party
1999	Somula Venkat Subba Reddy	Telugu Desam Party
2004	Somula Venkat Subba Reddy	Telugu Desam Party
2009	K. E. Prabhakar	Telugu Desam Party
2014	K. E. Krishna Murthy	Telugu Desam Party
2019	Kangati Sreedevi	YSR Congress Party
2024	K. E. Shyam Babu	Telugu Desam Party

== Election results ==
=== 2004 ===
2004 Andhra Pradesh Legislative Assembly election: Pattikonda
Party	Candidate	Votes	%	±%
TDP	S. V. Subba Reddy	45,751	39.29	−11.86
Independent	Patil Neeraja Reddy	40,783	35.02	
CPI	P.Ramachandraiah	21,388	18.37	
Majority		4,968	4.27	
Turnout		116,442	69.59	−0.30
TDP hold		Swing		

=== 2009 ===
2009 Andhra Pradesh Legislative Assembly election: Pattikonda
Party	Candidate	Votes	%	±%
TDP	K. E. Prabhakar	67,640	49.30	+10.01
INC	S. V. Chandra Mohan Reddy	57,668	42.03	
PRP	N. Mohan Prasad	5,176	3.77	
Majority		9,972	7.27	
Turnout		137,210	77.65	+8.06
TDP hold		Swing		

=== 2014 ===
2014 Andhra Pradesh Legislative Assembly election: Pattikonda
Party	Candidate	Votes	%	±%
TDP	K. E. Krishna Murthy	62,706	39.83	
YSRCP	Kotla Hari Chakrapani Reddy	54,807	34.81	
INC	Kangati Lakshmi Narayana Reddy	31,267	19.84	
Majority		7,899	5.02	
Turnout		157,595	79.46	+1.81
TDP hold		Swing		

=== 2019 ===
2019 Andhra Pradesh Legislative Assembly election: Pattikonda
Party	Candidate	Votes	%	±%
YSRCP	Kangati Sreedevi	100,981	59.82	
TDP	K. E. Shyam Kumar	58,916	34.90	
INC	Kranthi Naidu Boya	2,385	1.41	
Majority		42,065	24.92	
Turnout		1,68,788	81.57	
YSRCP gain from TDP		Swing		

=== 2024 ===
2024 Andhra Pradesh Legislative Assembly election: Pattikonda
Party	Candidate	Votes	%	±%
TDP	K. E. Shyam Kumar	98,849	51.58	
YSRCP	Kangati Sreedevi	84,638	44.17	
CPI	Ramachandraiah	1,956	1.02	
NOTA	None of the above	2,070	1.08	
Majority		14,211	7.41	
Turnout		1,91,631		
TDP gain from YSRCP		Swing		

== See also ==
- List of constituencies of Andhra Pradesh Legislative Assembly
