= K. E. Krishna Murthy =

Indian politician (born 1938)

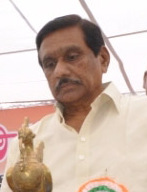

7th Deputy Chief Minister of Andhra Pradesh
- In office 8 June 2014 – 29 May 2019 Serving with Nimmakayala Chinarajappa
- Governor: E. S. L. Narasimhan
- Chief Minister: N. Chandrababu Naidu
- Preceded by: Damodar Raja Narasimha
- Succeeded by: Pilli Subhash Chandra Bose; Alla Nani; K. Narayana Swamy; Pushpasreevani Pamula; Amzath Basha Shaik Bepari

Minister for Revenue, Registration and Stamps Government of Andhra Pradesh
- In office 8 June 2014 – 29 May 2019
- Governor: E. S. L. Narasimhan
- Chief Minister: N. Chandrababu Naidu
- Preceded by: Raghu Veera Reddy
- Succeeded by: Pilli Subhash Chandra Bose

Member of Parliament, Lok Sabha
- In office 1999 - 2004
- Preceded by: Kotla Vijaya Bhaskara Reddy
- Succeeded by: Kotla Jaya Surya Prakash Reddy
- Constituency: Kurnool

Member of Legislative Assembly Andhra Pradesh
- In office 2014 - 2019
- Preceded by: K. E. Prabhakar
- Succeeded by: Kangati Sreedevi
- Constituency: Pattikonda
- In office 2009 - 2014
- Preceded by: Kotla Sujathamma
- Succeeded by: Buggana Rajendranath Reddy
- Constituency: Dhone
- In office 1978 - 1994
- Preceded by: Seshanna
- Succeeded by: Kotla Vijaya Bhaskara Reddy
- Constituency: Dhone

Personal details
- Born: Kambalapadu Ediga Krisha Murthy Goud; 2 October 1938 (age 88) Dhone, India
- Spouse: K. E. Padmavathamma
- Relations: K. E. Madanna (Father) K. E. Prabhakar (Brother); K. E. Prathap (Brother) K. E. Shyam Babu (son)
- Education: Sri Venkateswara University
- Occupation: Politician
- Known for: Telugu Ganga project

Kambalapadu Ediga Krishna Murthy (born 2 October 1938), popularly known as K. E. Krishna Murthy, is an Indian politician from Andhra Pradesh. He served as Deputy Chief Minister of Andhra Pradesh from 2014-2019 and as an Irrigation minister in N. T. Rama Rao cabinet from 1985-1987. Also he worked in the cabinet of Tanguturi Anjaiah.

Murthy was elected to the Andhra Pradesh Legislative Assembly five times from Dhone constituency, one time from Pattikonda constituency and to the Lok Sabha for one term from Kurnool constituency.

== Early life and education ==
Krishna Murthy was born in Kambalapadu, Kurnool district. His father K. E. Madanna is a freedom fighter. His mother's name is K. E. Madamma. His son K. E. Shyam Babu won the 2024 Andhra Pradesh Legislative Assembly election from Pattikonda Assembly constituency representing Telugu Desam Party. He has two younger brothers K. E. Prabhakar and K. E. Prathap. He pursued M.A. from Sri Venkateswara University and L.L.B. from Sagar University, Madhya Pradesh. He is considered as a popular OBC Goud community leader of Andhra Pradesh.

== Career ==
Following the footsteps of his father, who was the former MLA and MLC, Murthy entered politics after his father retired in 1978. He was elected as an MLA for the first time in 1978 from Dhone Assembly Constituency representing Indian National Congress. He got elected for a second term from the same constituency in 1983 again on Indian National Congress Party ticket.

He later resigned from Indian National Congress (INC) party and joined the Telugu Desam Party and won a third term as MLA from the same Dhone constituency in 1985 defeating Kotla Vijaya Bhaskara Reddy.

Later, he had differences with former Chief Minister N. T. Rama Rao, and rejoined INC. He won as MLA for the fourth time from Dhone in 1989.

He worked as a minister in both the cabinets of former chief ministers, Tanguturi Anjaiah of INC and N. T. Rama Rao of TDP.

In 1998, he once again resigned from INC and shifted to TDP under the leadership of chief minister Nara Chandrababu Naidu and lost the Kurnool Lok Sabha Constituency by a small margin to Kotla Vijaya Bhaskara Reddy. However, he entered the Parliament of India in 1999 representing TDP from Kurnool, defeating Reddy this time. In parliament, he was a member of the Committee on Defence, and Committee on Public Undertakings.

In 2004, he lost the Kurnool Lok Sabha constituency. He also served as Revenue, Stamps & Registration minister and was the Polit Bureau member of the TDP.

In 2009, he won the Dhone Assembly Constituency for the fifth time representing Telugu Desam Party. In 2013, he was appointed to AP Public Accounts Committee. Later in 2014, he shifted to Pattikonda Assembly Constituency and won as MLA for the sixth time in the 2014 Andhra Pradesh Legislative Assembly Election. He became the Deputy Chief Minister of Andhra Pradesh and also held the Revenue, Stamps & Registration ministry.
