= K. E. Shyam Kumar =

Indian politician

Kambalapadu Ediga Shyam Kumar

Member of Legislative Assembly Andhra Pradesh
- Incumbent
- Assumed office 4 June 2024
- Preceded by: Kangati Sreedevi
- Constituency: Pattikonda

Personal details
- Party: Telugu Desam Party
- Parent(s): K. E. Krishna Murthy; K. E. Padmavathamma

Kambalapadu Ediga Shyam Kumar (born 1982) is an Indian politician from Andhra Pradesh. He is an MLA from Pattikonda Assembly constituency in Kurnool district. He represents Telugu Desam Party. He won the 2024 Andhra Pradesh Legislative Assembly election where TDP had an alliance with BJP and Jana Sena Party.

== Early life and education ==
Kumar is from Pattikonda. His father K. E. Krishnamurthy, served as a deputy chief minister. He completed his M.B.A. in 2001 at Institute of Computer and Business Management, Hyderabad. He runs his own business.

== Political career ==
Kumar won the 2024 Andhra Pradesh Legislative Assembly election from Pattikonda Assembly constituency representing Telugu Desam Party. He polled 98,849 votes and defeated his nearest rival, Kangati Sreedevi of YSR Congress Party, by a margin of 14,211 votes.

He was involved in a criminal case, an alleged murder case, and was arrested in February 2018. He denied the allegations and claimed that it was a false accusation.
