= Buggana Rajendranath Reddy =

Indian politician

Minister of Finance, Planning, Commercial Taxes and Legislative Affairs Government of Andhra Pradesh
- In office 8 June 2019 – 4 June 2024
- Governor: E. S. L. Narasimhan (2019); Biswabhusan Harichandan (2019-2023); S. Abdul Nazeer (2023-2024)
- Chief Minister: Y. S. Jagan Mohan Reddy
- Preceded by: Yanamala Rama Krishnudu
- Succeeded by: Payyavula Keshav

Member of Legislative Assembly Andhra Pradesh
- In office 2014–2024
- Preceded by: K. E. Krishna Murthy
- Succeeded by: Kotla Jaya Surya Prakash Reddy
- Constituency: Dhone

Personal details
- Born: 27 September 1970 (age 56) Bethamcherla, Kurnool District, Andhra Pradesh
- Citizenship: India
- Party: YSR Congress Party
- Children: 2
- Education: Vijayanagar Engineering College
- Occupation: Politician; Engineer

Buggana Rajendranath Reddy (born 27 September 1970) is an Indian politician from Andhra Pradesh. He is a two time MLA and also served as the Minister for Finance, Planning and Legislative Affairs in the Y. S. Jagan Mohan Reddy's ministry. He has been nominated again by YSRCP to contest the Dhone Assembly seat in the 2024 Assembly Election.

== Early life and education ==
Reddy was born in Bethamcherla, Kurnool district, Andhra Pradesh, to Buggana Ramnath Reddy, a former village sarpanch, and Buggana Parvathi Devi. His maternal grandfather was film director K. V. Reddy.

He attended Hyderabad Public School and completed his pre-university studies at Madras Christian College in Chennai. In 1992, he graduated with a Bachelor of Engineering degree in computer science from Vijayanagar Engineering College in Bellary.

== Political career ==
Reddy was first elected to the Andhra Pradesh Legislative Assembly from Dhone in the 2014 Andhra Pradesh Legislative Assembly election, defeating K. E. Prathap of the Telugu Desam Party by 11,152 votes. From 2016 to 2019, he served as chairman of the Andhra Pradesh Legislative Assembly's Public Accounts Committee.

He was re-elected in the 2019 Andhra Pradesh Legislative Assembly election, again defeating K. E. Prathap, this time by a margin of 35,516 votes.

In the 2024 Andhra Pradesh Legislative Assembly election, Reddy lost the Dhone constituency to Kotla Jayasurya Prakasha Reddy of the Telugu Desam Party by 6,049 votes. Reddy received 87,474 votes, compared with 93,523 for Kotla.
