= Dhone Assembly constituency =

Constituency of the Andhra Pradesh Legislative Assembly, India

Coordinates: 15.40°N 77.87°E

Dhone
- Constituency No. 141 for the Andhra Pradesh Legislative Assembly
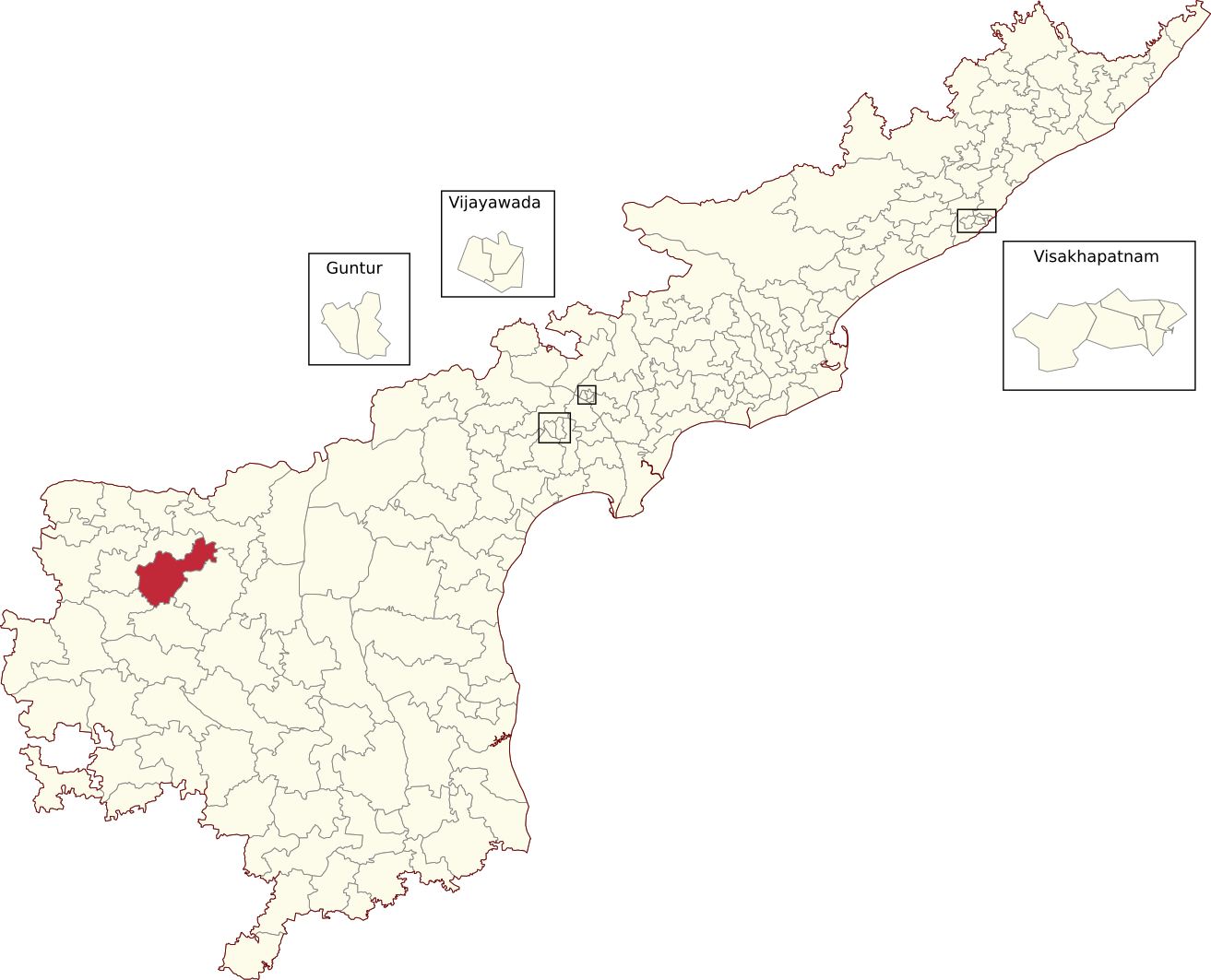
- Location of Dhone Assembly constituency within Andhra Pradesh

Constituency details
- Country: India
- Region: South India
- State: Andhra Pradesh
- District: Nandyal
- Lok Sabha constituency: Nandyal
- Established: 1951
- Total electors: 219,678
- Reservation: None

Member of Legislative Assembly
- 16th Andhra Pradesh Legislative Assembly
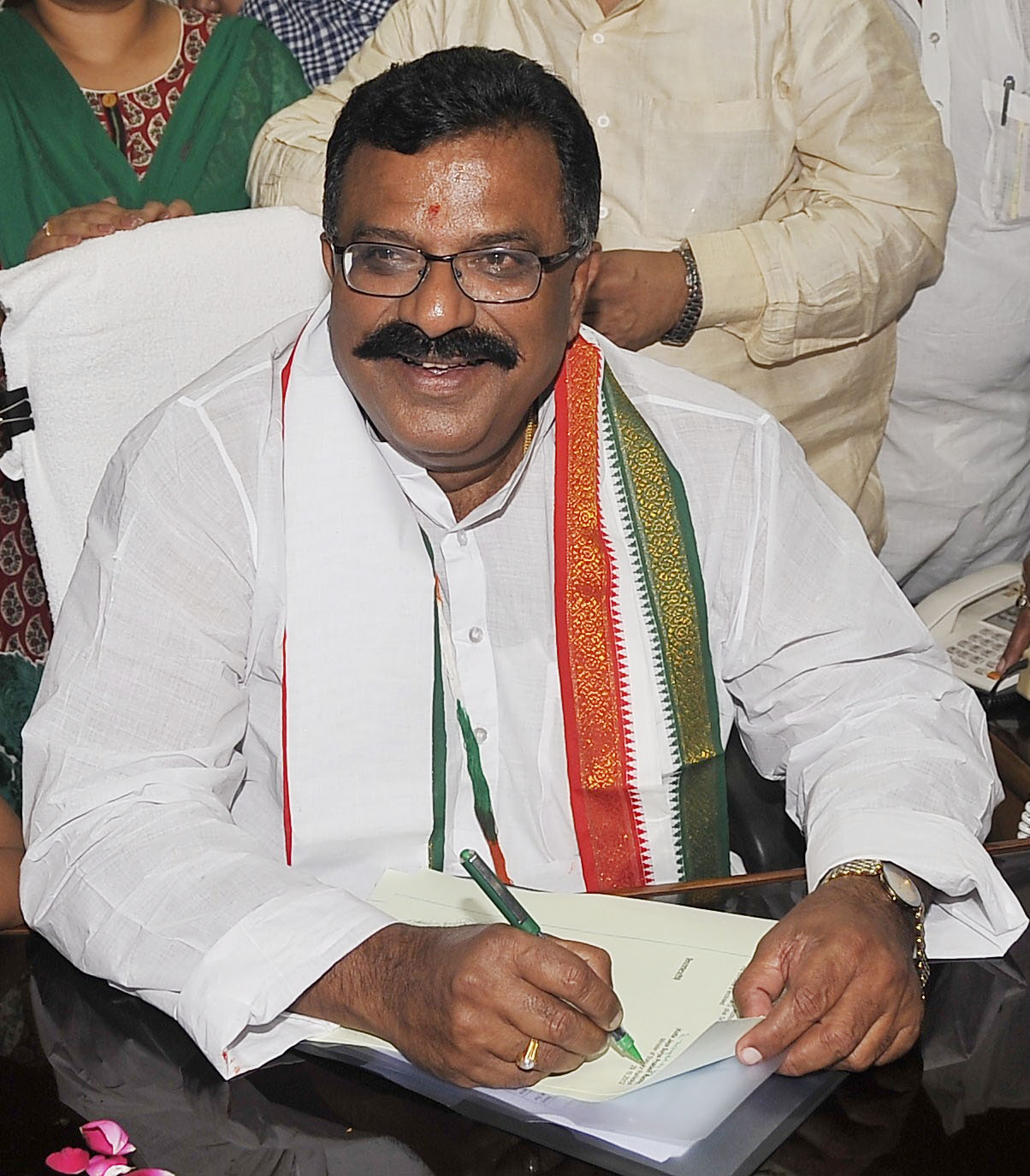
- Incumbent Kotla Jayasurya Prakasha Reddy
- Party: TDP
- Alliance: NDA
- Elected year: 2024

Dhone Assembly constituency is a constituency in Nandyal district of Andhra Pradesh that elects representatives to the Andhra Pradesh Legislative Assembly in India. It is one of the seven assembly segments of Nandyal Lok Sabha constituency.

Kotla Jayasurya Prakasha Reddy is the current MLA of the constituency, having won the 2024 Andhra Pradesh Legislative Assembly election from Telugu Desam Party. As of 25 March 2019, there are a total of 219,678 electors in the constituency. The constituency was established in 1951, as per the Delimitation Orders (1951).

== Mandals ==
Mandal
Bethamcherla
Dhone
Peapally

== Members of the Legislative Assembly ==
Year	Member	Political party
1952	VenkataSetty Kotrike	Independent
1955	B. P. Sesha Reddy	Independent
1962	Neelam Sanjeeva Reddy	Indian National Congress
1967	K. V. K. Murthy	Swatantra Party
1972	Seshanna	Indian National Congress
1978	K. E. Krishna Murthy	Indian National Congress
1983	K. E. Krishna Murthy	Indian National Congress
1985	K. E. Krishna Murthy	Telugu Desam Party
1989	K. E. Krishna Murthy	Indian National Congress
1994	Kotla Vijaya Bhaskara Reddy	Indian National Congress
1999	K. E. Prabhakar	Telugu Desam Party
2004	Kotla Sujathamma	Indian National Congress
2009	K. E. Krishna Murthy	Telugu Desam Party
2014	Buggana Rajendranath	YSR Congress Party
2019	Buggana Rajendranath	YSR Congress Party
2024	Kotla Jayasurya Prakasha Reddy	Telugu Desam Party

== Election results ==
=== 1952 ===
1952 Madras Legislative Assembly election: Dhone
Party	Candidate	Votes	%	±%
Independent	Venkatasetty Kotrike	28,493	59.99%	
INC	Venkatasubbiah Nivarthi	16,946	35.68%	35.68%
Independent	Lakshmayya Padde	2,057	4.33%	
Margin of victory		11,547	24.31%	
Turnout		47,496	60.69%	
Registered electors		78,264		
Independent win (new seat)				

=== 2004 ===
2004 Andhra Pradesh Legislative Assembly election: Dhone
Party	Candidate	Votes	%	±%
INC	Kotla Sujathamma	55,982	49.17	+16.63
TDP	K. E. Pratap	53,373	46.88	−20.15
Majority		2,609	2.29	
Turnout		113,857	65.28	−3.69
INC gain from TDP		Swing		

=== 2009 ===
2009 Andhra Pradesh Legislative Assembly election: Dhone
Party	Candidate	Votes	%	±%
TDP	K. E. Krishna Murthy	60,769	43.56	−3.32
INC	Kotla Sujathamma	56,118	40.22	−8.95
PRP	Marri Govinda Raj	14,535	10.42	
Majority		4,651	3.34	
Turnout		139,516	70.50	+5.22
TDP gain from INC		Swing		

=== 2014 ===
2014 Andhra Pradesh Legislative Assembly election: Dhone
Party	Candidate	Votes	%	±%
YSRCP	Buggana Rajendranath Reddy	83,683	49.86	
TDP	K. E. Pratap	72,531	43.21	
Majority		11,152	6.65	
Turnout		167,849	77.51	+7.01
YSRCP gain from TDP		Swing		

=== 2019 ===
2019 Andhra Pradesh Legislative Assembly election: Dhone
Party	Candidate	Votes	%	±%
YSRCP	Buggana Rajendranath Reddy	100,845	57.79	+7.93
TDP	K. E. Prathap	65,329	37.44	−5.77
Majority		35,516	20.48	
Turnout		173,414	78.94	
YSRCP hold		Swing		

=== 2024 ===
2024 Andhra Pradesh Legislative Assembly election: Dhone
Party	Candidate	Votes	%	±%
TDP	Kotla Jayasurya Prakasha Reddy	93,523	51	
YSRCP	Buggana Rajendranath Reddy	87,474	46.01	
INC	Garlapati Madhileti Swami	4023	2.1	
NOTA	None Of The Above	1,362	0.72	
Majority		6,049	3.18	
Turnout		1,90,120		
TDP gain from YSRCP		Swing		

== See also ==
- List of constituencies of Andhra Pradesh Legislative Assembly
