= Bastipati Nagaraju Panchalingala =

Indian politician

Member of Parliament, Lok Sabha
- Incumbent
- Assumed office 2024
- Preceded by: Sanjeev Kumar
- Constituency: Kurnool

Personal details
- Party: Telugu Desam Party
- Occupation: Politician

Bastipati Nagaraju Panchalingala (born 1979) is an Indian politician from Andhra Pradesh. He won the 2024 Indian general election in Andhra Pradesh and was elected from Kurnool Lok Sabha constituency representing Telugu Desam Party.

== Early life and education ==
Nagaraju is from Panchalingala, Kurnool. He is the son of Kuruva Bhushanna. He completed M.Sc in Chemistry in 2006 at Swamy Ramanand Teertha Marathwada University. He quit the government job as a lecturer in 2021 to enter politics.

== Career ==
Nagaraju served as a MPTC member of Panchalingala. He won the 2024 Indian general election in Andhra Pradesh from Kurnool Lok Sabha constituency representing Telugu Desam Party. He polled 6,58,914 votes and defeated his nearest rival, B. Y. Ramaiah, of YSR Congress Party by a margin of 1.11.298 votes.

== Election statistics ==
	Year	Contested For	Party	Constituency	Opponent	Opponent Party	Votes	Majority	Result
1	2024	MP	Telugu Desam Party	Kurnool	B Y Ramaiah	YSRCP	6,58,914	1,11,298	Won

== See also ==
- 18th Lok Sabha
