= Kotla Vijaya Bhaskara Reddy =

Indian politician

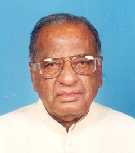

9th Chief Minister of Andhra Pradesh
- In office 9 October 1992 – 12 December 1994
- Governor: Krishan Kant
- Deputy Chief Minister: Koneru Ranga Rao (1992-1994)
- Preceded by: Nedurumalli Janardhana Reddy
- Succeeded by: Nandamuri Taraka Ramarao
- In office 20 September 1982 – 9 January 1983
- Governor: K. C. Abraham
- Preceded by: Bhavanam Venkatarami Reddy
- Succeeded by: Nandamuri Taraka Ramarao

Union Minister of Law, Justice & Company Affairs
- In office 21 June 1991 – 9 October 1992
- Prime Minister: P. V. Narasimha Rao
- Preceded by: Subramanian Swamy
- Succeeded by: P. V. Narasimha Rao

Union Minister of Industry
- In office 7 September 1984 – 31 December 1984
- Prime Minister: Indira Gandhi
- Preceded by: V. P. Singh
- Succeeded by: Rajiv Gandhi

Union Minister of Shipping and Transport
- In office 2 February 1983 – 7 September 1984
- Prime Minister: Indira Gandhi
- Preceded by: C. M. Stephen
- Succeeded by: Veerendra Patil

Member of Andhra Pradesh Legislative Assembly
- In office 1994–1994
- Preceded by: K. E. Prabhakar
- Succeeded by: K. E. Krishna Murthy
- Constituency: Dhone
- In office 1983–1985
- Preceded by: Hanumantha Reddy
- Succeeded by: B. V. Mohan Reddy
- Constituency: Yemmiganur

15th President of the Andhra Pradesh Congress Committee
- In office 1980–1981
- AICC President: Indira Gandhi
- Preceded by: Kona Prabhakara Rao
- Succeeded by: Kona Prabhakara Rao

Member of Parliament, Lok Sabha
- In office 1996–1999
- Preceded by: Kotla Jaya Surya Prakash Reddy
- Succeeded by: K. E. Krishnamurthy
- Constituency: Kurnool
- In office 1989–1991
- Preceded by: E. Ayyapu Reddy
- Succeeded by: Kotla Jaya Surya Prakash Reddy
- Constituency: Kurnool
- In office 1977–1984
- Preceded by: K. Kodanda Rami Reddy
- Succeeded by: E. Ayyapu Reddy
- Constituency: Kurnool

Minister of Cooperation, Major Irrigation and Finance
- In office 1967–1971
- Chief Minister: Kasu Brahmananda Reddy

Member of Legislative Council Andhra Pradesh
- In office 1967–1972
- Chairman: Pidathala Ranga Reddy; Thota Rama Swamy
- Deputy Chairman: Mamidipudi Anandam; Erram Sathynarayana
- Leader of the House: Kasu Brahmananda Reddy; P. V. Narasimha Rao
- Constituency: Andhra Pradesh

Personal details
- Born: 16 August 1920 Amakathadu, Laddagiri Village, Kurnool District, Madras Presidency, British India
- Died: 27 September 2001 (aged 81)
- Party: Indian National Congress
- Spouse: K. Shyamla Reddy
- Children: Two sons and three daughters
- Education: Besant Theosophical College, Madanapalle and Madras Law College, Madras (Tamil Nadu)
- Profession: Agriculturist, Lawyer, Sportsman, Political and Social worker

Kotla Vijaya Bhaskara Reddy (16 August 1920 – 27 September 2001) served as the 9th chief minister of the Indian state of Andhra Pradesh in 1983 and then from 1992 to 1994. Reddy was a member of the Indian National Congress and was elected to the Lok Sabha six times. Reddy also served as a Union cabinet Minister, along with serving on several parliamentary committees. He lost the 1999 elections and subsequently retired from active politics. Botanical Garden in Hyderabad is named after him.

== Early life ==
Reddy was born in the remote village of Laddagiri in the Kurnool district to the family of a landlord. He began his involvement in politics at Nandyal gram panchayat and eventually became involved in the national level. He studied for his B.A., at Besant Theosophical College, Madanapalle and his LL.B. at Madras Law College, in Madras, Tamil Nadu in 1947. While Reddy graduated law school, he rarely practiced law due to his political workload.

== Personal life ==
Reddy was married on 7 June 1950 to Smt. K. Shyamla Reddy. He had two sons and three daughters. His son, Kotla Jayasurya Prakasha Reddy, was a Member of Parliament representing Kurnool Parliamentary constituency for his second term. Reddy's interests included sports, games, and reading. He was the captain of the hockey and football teams at Besant Theosophical College in Madanapalli, Andhra Pradesh and Chairman of Andhra Pradesh Sports Council from 1967 to 1969. He improved infrastructure in the Kurnool District and developed farmland in his native village.

== Political career ==
Reddy represented several assembly constituencies in the district, but his major breakthrough came when he was elected as chairman of Zilla Parishad. He held several posts both in the Indian National Congress party and in central and state governments. He was the ninth chief minister in the undivided Andhra Pradesh. Reddy engaged in value-based politics, and he remained respected even after losing his Chief Ministership to N. T. Rama Rao. After his death, "Kisan ghat" was erected in his memory by the state government.

As a politician, Reddy was credited with starting 15 primary and secondary schools in villages throughout the Kurnool District in Andhra Pradesh. As Chief Minister, he was known for introducing a mid-day meal scheme in primary schools for children 6–11 years old in the state of Andhra Pradesh. He also became known for supplying rice at a highly subsidised rate of Rs 1.90 per kg for poor families. Reddy became MLA for the first time in 1955, but he was denied a ticket in 1962. Unlike other Chief Ministers, Reddy did not have any corruption charges brought against him.

== Positions held ==
Throughout his 44-year career, Reddy served in both local and national positions. His work included the following:

=== Designations ===
Year	Designation
1955–61	Member, Andhra Pradesh Legislative Assembly Secretary, Congress Legislature Party, Andhra Pradesh
1955–61	Member, Public Accounts Committee
1959–67	Chairman, Zila Parishad, Kurnool
1961–62	Chairman, Public Accounts Committee
1962–64	General-Secretary, Pradesh Congress Committee (Indira) [P.C.C.(I)], Andhra Pradesh
1967–72	Member, Andhra Pradesh Legislative Council
1967–71	Minister, Co-operation, Major Irrigation and Finance, Andhra Pradesh
1977	Elected to 6th Lok Sabha
1977–82	Member, Committee on Estimates
1980–81	President, P.C.C.(I), Andhra Pradesh
1980	Re-elected to 7th Lok Sabha (2nd term)
1982–83	Chief Minister, Andhra Pradesh
1983–84	Union Cabinet Minister, Shipping and Transport and Union Cabinet Minister, Industry and Company Affairs
1989	Re-elected to 9th Lok Sabha (3rd term)
1990–91	Member, Committee on Subordinate Legislation/Member, Consultative Committee, Ministry of Water Resources/Member, Political Affairs Committee, Congress Parliamentary Party (C.P.P.)
1991	Re-elected to 10th Lok Sabha (4th term)
1991–92	Union Cabinet Minister, Law, Justice and Company Affairs
1992–94	Member, Andhra Pradesh Legislative Assembly
1992–94	Chief Minister, Andhra Pradesh (2nd term)
1996	Re-elected to 11th Lok Sabha (5th term)
1996–97	Member, Committee on Transport and Tourism
1998	Re-elected to 12th Lok Sabha (6th term)
1998–99	Member, Committee on Transport and Tourism/Member, Rules Committee/Member, Consultative Committee, Ministry of Civil Aviation

== Electoral History ==
=== Lok Sabha ===
Year	Constituency	Party	Votes	%	Opponent	Party	Votes	%	Result	Margin	%
1977	Kurnool	INC	2,70,741	75.69	Somappa	BLD	71,385	19.96	Won	+1,99,356	+55.73
1980	Kurnool	INC(I)	2,31,889	77.53	Nasir Ahmed	JP	27,040	9.04	Won	+2,04,849	+68.49
1984	Kurnool	INC	2,46,542	48.51	Erasu Ayyapu Reddy	TDP	2,53,832	49.94	Lost	-7,290	-1.43
1989	Kurnool	INC	3,63,955	57.89	Erasu Ayyapu Reddy	TDP	2,53,537	40.32	Won	+1,10,418	+17.57
1991	Kurnool	INC	3,02,352	51.92	S. V. Subba Reddy	TDP	2,49,885	42.91	Won	+52,467	+9.01
1996	Kurnool	INC	3,23,208	46.43	S. V. Subba Reddy	TDP	2,90,389	41.72	Won	+32,819	+4.71
1998	Kurnool	INC	3,68,044	48.91	K. E. Krishnamurthy	TDP	3,55,208	47.21	Won	+12,836	+1.70
1999	Kurnool	INC	3,61,201	48.01	K. E. Krishnamurthy	TDP	3,85,688	51.27	Lost	-24,487	-3.26
