= Uravakonda Assembly constituency =

Constituency of the Andhra Pradesh Legislative Assembly, India

Coordinates: 14.94°N 77.26°E

Uravakonda
- Constituency No. 149 for the Andhra Pradesh Legislative Assembly
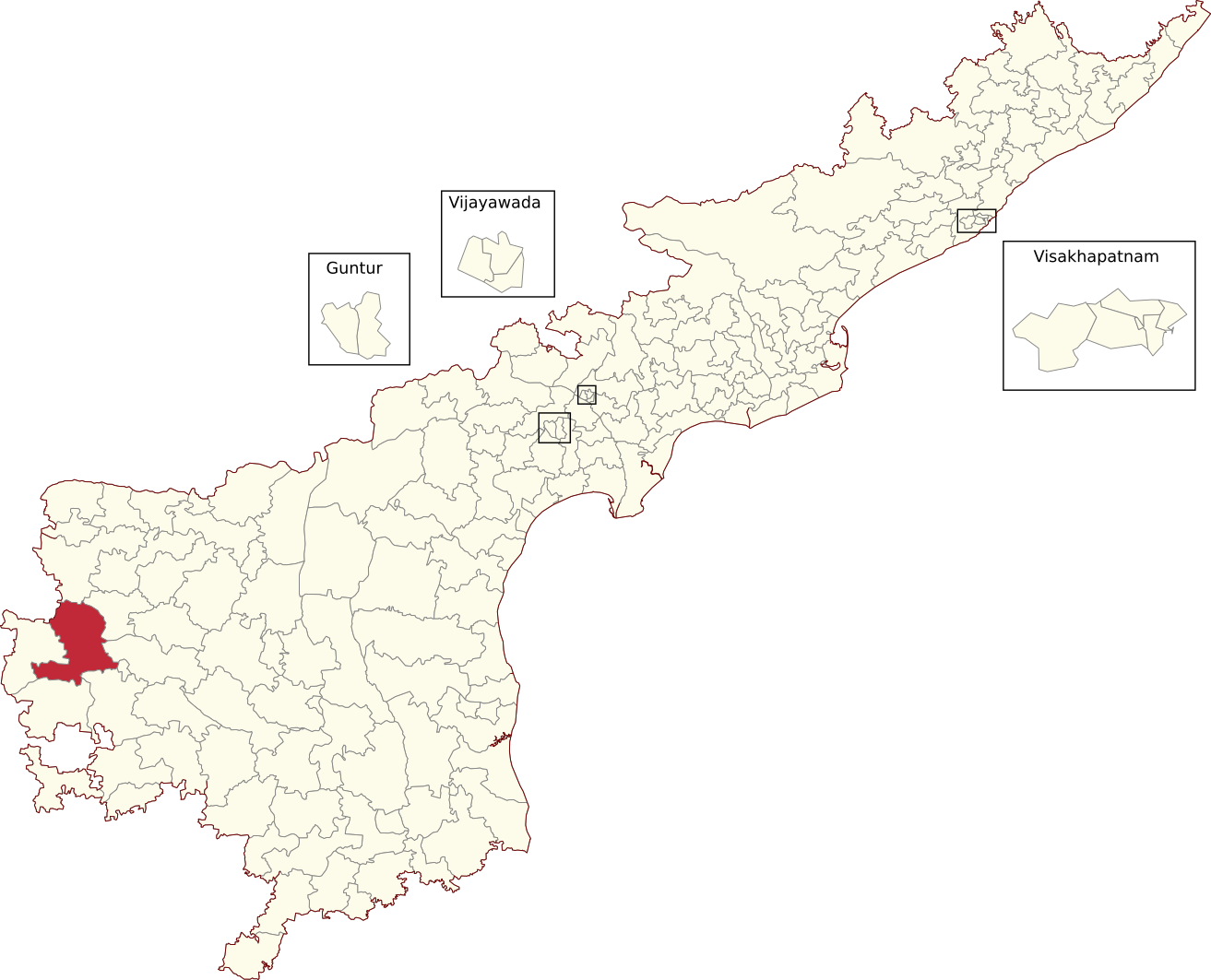
- Location of Uravakonda Assembly constituency within Andhra Pradesh

Constituency details
- Country: India
- Region: South India
- State: Andhra Pradesh
- District: Anantapur
- Lok Sabha constituency: Anantapur
- Established: 1962
- Total electors: 215,741
- Reservation: None

Member of Legislative Assembly
- 16th Andhra Pradesh Legislative Assembly
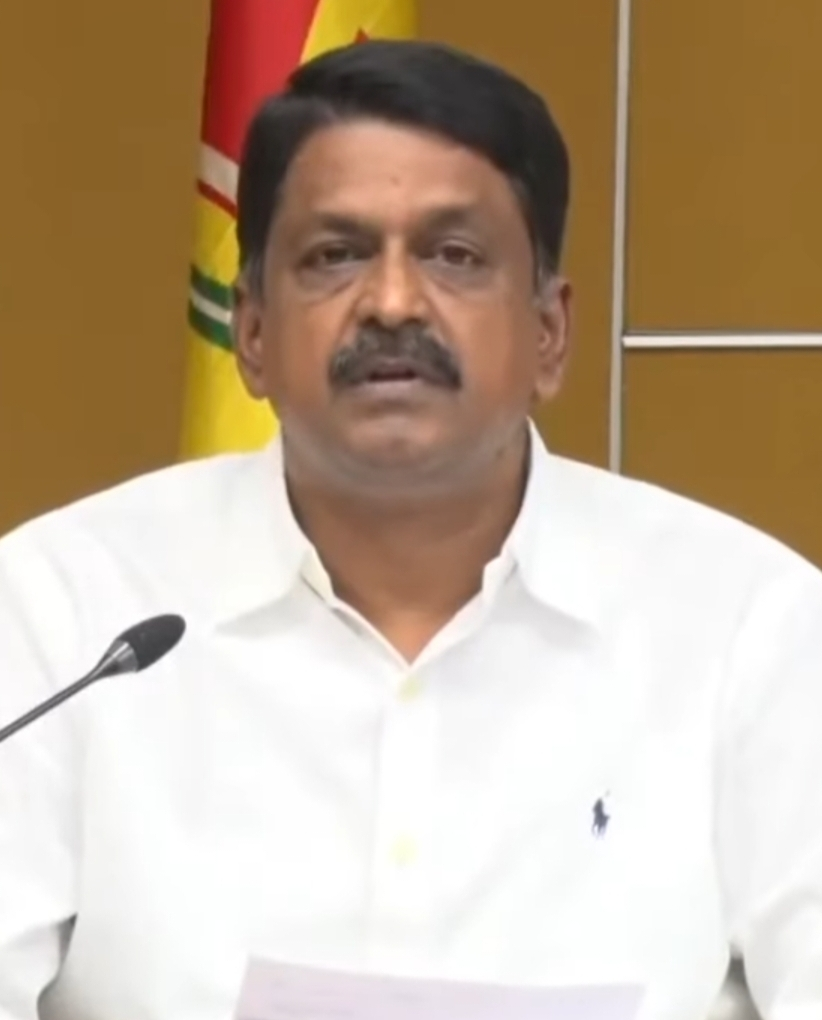
- Incumbent Payyavula Keshav
- Party: TDP
- Alliance: NDA
- Elected year: 2024

Uravakonda Assembly constituency is a constituency in Anantapur district of Andhra Pradesh that elects representatives to the Andhra Pradesh Legislative Assembly in India. It is one of the seven assembly segments of Anantapur Lok Sabha constituency.

Payyavula Keshav is the current MLA of the constituency, having won the 2024 Andhra Pradesh Legislative Assembly election from Telugu Desam Party. As of 2019, there are a total of 215,741 electors in the constituency. The constituency was established in 1962, as per the Delimitation Orders (1962).

== Mandals ==
Mandal
Vidapanakal
Vajrakarur
Uravakonda
Beluguppa
Kudair

== Members of the Legislative Assembly ==
Year	Member	Political party
1962	Gurram Chinna Venkanna	Independent
1967	Gurram Chinna Venkanna	Indian National Congress
1972	Bukkitla Basappa	Independent
1978	R.Vemanna	Indian National Congress
1983	Y. Bheema Reddy	Telugu Desam Party
1985	Gurram Narayanappa	Telugu Desam Party
1989	Vasikeri Gopinath	Indian National Congress
1994	Payyavula Keshav	Telugu Desam Party
1999	Yellareddy Gari Sivarama Reddy	Indian National Congress
2004	Payyavula Keshav	Telugu Desam Party
2009	Payyavula Keshav	Telugu Desam Party
2014	Y. Visweswara Reddy	YSR Congress Party
2019	Payyavula Keshav	Telugu Desam Party
2024	Payyavula Keshav	Telugu Desam Party

== Election results ==
=== 2004 ===
2004 Andhra Pradesh Legislative Assembly election: Uravakonda
Party	Candidate	Votes	%	±%
TDP	Payyavula Keshav	55,756	51.81	+6.98
CPI(ML)L	Y. Visweswara Reddy	47,501	44.14	
Majority		8,255	7.67	
Turnout		107,608	70.80	+4.94
TDP gain from INC		Swing		

=== 2009 ===
2009 Andhra Pradesh Legislative Assembly election: Uravakonda
Party	Candidate	Votes	%	±%
TDP	Payyavula Keshav	64,728	45.29	−6.52
INC	Y. Visweswara Reddy	64,499	45.13	
PRP	Gurram Chennakeshava Rao	8,255	5.78	
Majority		229	0.16	
Turnout		142,910	76.29	+5.49
TDP hold		Swing		

=== 2014 ===
2014 Andhra Pradesh Legislative Assembly election: Uravakonda
Party	Candidate	Votes	%	±%
YSRCP	Y. Visweswara Reddy	81,042	48.80	
TDP	Payyavula Keshav	78,767	47.43	
Majority		2,275	1.37	
Turnout		166,065	85.86	+9.57
YSRCP gain from TDP		Swing		

=== 2019 ===
2019 Andhra Pradesh Legislative Assembly election: Uravakonda
Party	Candidate	Votes	%	±%
TDP	Payyavula Keshav	90,209	48.30	
YSRCP	Y. Visweswara Reddy	88,077	47.16	
Majority		2,132	1.14	
Turnout		1,86,756		
TDP gain from YSRCP		Swing		

=== 2024 ===
2024 Andhra Pradesh Legislative Assembly election: Uravakonda
Party	Candidate	Votes	%	±%
TDP	Payyavula Keshav	102,046	52.46	
YSRCP	Y. Visweswara Reddy	80,342	41.3	
INC	Y. Madhusudan Reddy	4,529	2.33	
NOTA	None of the above	1,915	0.98	
Majority		21,704	11.16	
Turnout		1,94,522		
TDP hold		Swing		
