= Kotla Jayasurya Prakasha Reddy =

Indian politician

Kotla Prakasha Reddy
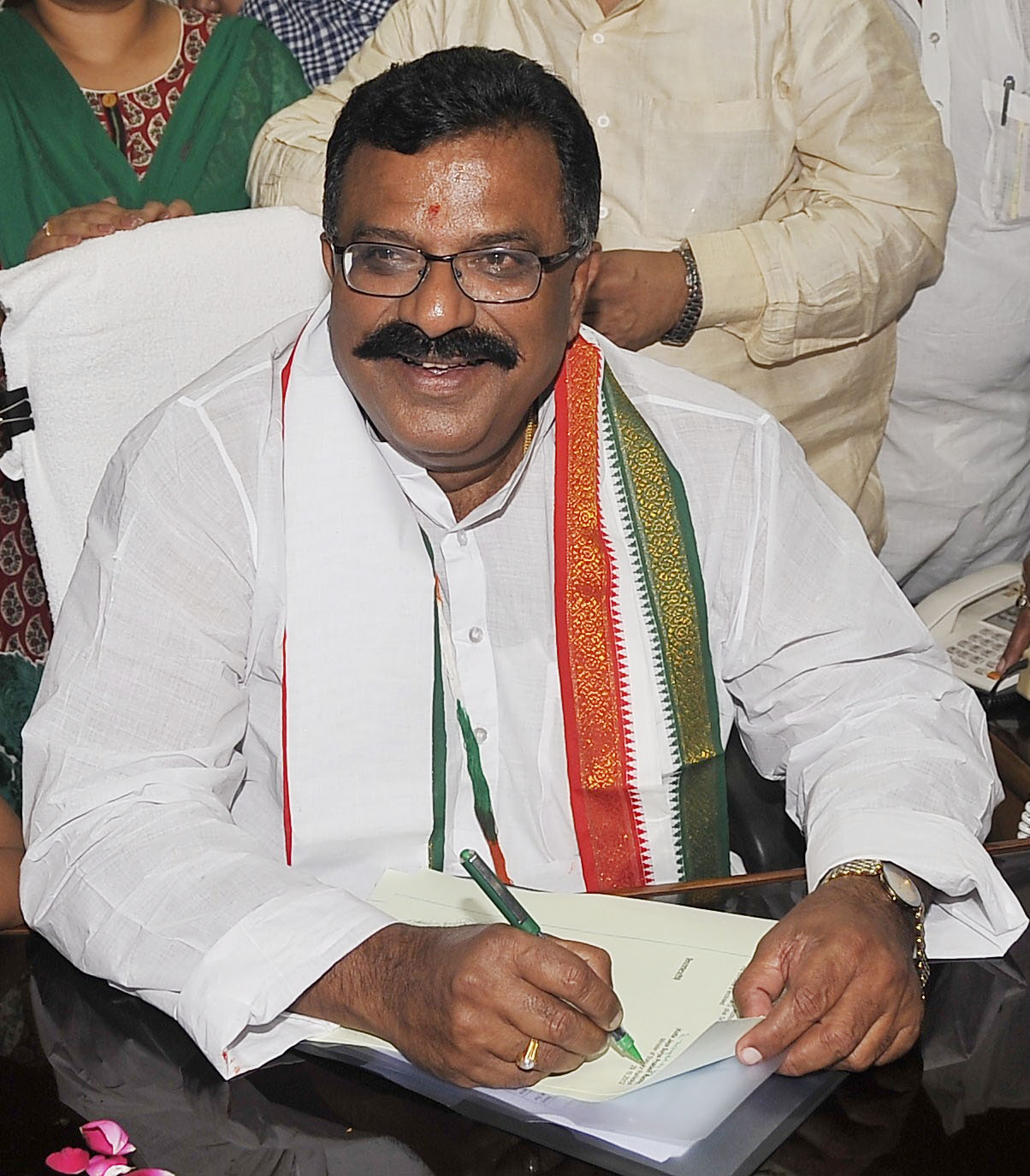
- Taking charge as the Minister of State for Railways

Member of Legislative Assembly Andhra Pradesh
- Incumbent
- Assumed office 4 June 2024
- Preceded by: Buggana Rajendranath Reddy
- Constituency: Dhone

27th Union Minister of State for Railways
- In office 28 October 2012 – 26 Jun 2014 (served along with Adhir Ranjan Chowdhury)
- Prime Minister: Manmohan Singh
- Minister: Pawan Kumar Bansal; C. P. Joshi; Manmohan Singh; Mallikarjun Kharge
- Preceded by: Mukul Roy
- Succeeded by: Manoj Sinha

Member of Parliament, Lok Sabha
- In office 13 May 2004 – 16 May 2014
- Preceded by: K. E. Krishna Murthy
- Succeeded by: Butta Renuka
- Constituency: Kurnool
- In office 22 June 1991 – 12 May 1996
- Preceded by: Kotla Vijaya Bhaskara Reddy
- Succeeded by: Kotla Vijaya Bhaskara Reddy
- Constituency: Kurnool

Personal details
- Born: 18 September 1951 (age 74) Hyderabad, Andhra Pradesh
- Party: Telugu Desam Party
- Other political affiliations: Indian National Congress
- Spouse: K. Sujatha Reddy
- Children: 1 son and 2 daughters
- As of 16 September, 2006 Source: [permanent dead link]

Kotla Jayasurya Prakasha Reddy (born 18 September 1951) was a member of the 15th Lok Sabha of India. He represented the Kurnool constituency of Andhra Pradesh and is a member of Telugu Desam Party.

== Early life ==
He was born in Hyderabad to Shyamala Devi and former Chief Minister Kotla Vijaya Bhaskara Reddy. He did his graduation from Nizam College, Hyderabad.

== Career ==
Kotla Surya Prakash Reddy was first elected to the parliament in 1991. He was re-elected as Member of Parliament from Kurnool in 2004 and 2009 for the 14th and 15th LokSabha respectively. He was the Minister of State for Railways in the UPA Government.

=== Positions held ===
Reddy has held various official posts:

- 28 October 2012 – Union Minister State, Railways.
- 23 September 2009 – Member, Committee on Government Assurances.
- 6 September 2010 – Member, Consultative Committee, Ministry of Petroleum & Natural Gas.
- 31 August 2009 – Member, Committee on Water Resources.
- 21 August 2009 – Member, Indian Council of Agricultural Research (I.C.A.R.).
- 6 August 2009 – Member, Committee on Estimates.
- 2009 – Re-elected to 15th Lok Sabha (3rd term).
- 2007 – Member, Committee on Agriculture.
- 2004 – Re-elected to 14th Lok Sabha (2nd term).
- 1991 – Elected to 10th Lok Sabha.

== Personal life ==
He is married to Kotla Sujatha Reddy and they have a son and two daughters.
