= Ventura AirConnect =

Indian Airline

- Founded: 2010; 16 years ago
- Commenced operations: 7 September 2011; 15 years ago
- Operating bases: Surat International Airport
- Fleet size: 4
- Destinations: 5
- Parent company: Diamond Aeronautics
- Headquarters: Surat, Gujarat, India
- Key people: Manubhai Sojitra, CEO
- Website: www.flyairconnect.com

Ventura AirConnect is an Indian nonscheduled airline operating flights in the state of Gujarat with Cessna 208 Caravan aircraft in its fleet. Initially operating flights within Madhya Pradesh, the airline shifted to Gujarat upon being acquired by a group of Gujarati diamond merchants in 2014. After suspending operations several times, it resumed its operations in January 2022 and made Surat International Airport its operating hub.

== Operation history ==
=== Madhya Pradesh operations (2010–13) ===
Ventura AirConnect was founded in 2010 as the first intrastate non-scheduled airline in India, providing air charter services within Madhya Pradesh. The airline was designed to connect the capital Bhopal with smaller cities throughout the state, as well as to facilitate tourism within Madhya Pradesh. Under an agreement signed between the state government and the airline, the state government partly subsidized Ventura AirConnect's flights.

Ventura AirConnect conducted its inaugural flight on 7 September 2011, between Bhopal and Gwalior. The inauguration ceremony was attended by Chief Minister Shivraj Singh Chouhan. By mid-2013, Ventura AirConnect was serving nine cities in the state. In early 2017, the Madhya Pradesh operations were taken over by Fly Divine.

=== Gujarat operations (2014–present) ===
In late 2014, Ventura AirConnect was acquired by Diamond Aeronautics, a consortium of Gujarati diamond merchants, for approximately ₹20 crore (US$2.1 million). Diamond Aeronautics had complained of limited air service from Surat, a major centre of the local diamond industry. With the purchase, the focus of Ventura AirConnect turned to improve air connectivity within Gujarat. The new venture commenced operations on 13 December 2014 with a flight from Surat to Bhavnagar.

The airline suspended operations in late 2015. There was a change in ownership, requiring security clearance from the Directorate General of Civil Aviation (DGCA). In April 2016, Ventura AirConnect won a tender from the Government of Gujarat to operate subsidised flights within the state. The airline's air operator's certificate was renewed on 9 June and it resumed operations on 25 June with a flight from Surat to Bhavnagar. It was suspended again. It relaunched for the third time in January 2018 and suspended services after a few months. The services resumed for the fourth time in January 2022.

The promoters include two diamond merchants and a realtor.

== Destinations ==
As of January 2022, Ventura AirConnect flies to the following destinations, all within the Indian state of Gujarat:

City	Airport	Flight time from Surat	Notes	Ref.
Ahmedabad	Sardar Vallabhbhai Patel International Airport	60 min	—	
Amreli	Amreli Airport	45 min	—	
Bhavnagar	Bhavnagar Airport	30 min	—	
Rajkot	Rajkot International Airport	60 min	—	
Surat	Surat International Airport		Hub	

== Fleet ==
As of September 2026, Ventura AirConnect operates the following aircraft:

Ventura AirConnect fleet
Aircraft	In service	Orders	Passengers	Notes
Cessna 208 Caravan	3		9	
Cessna 182 Skylane	1		4	
Total	4			
