= List of airports in Gujarat =

Airports in Gujarat

Gujarat, a state of India, has airports which have access to international flights, domestic and some disused airstrips for emergency purposes. The airports are operated and owned by either the Airports Authority of India, Indian Air Force, Government of Gujarat or private companies.

There are three international airports, nine domestic airports, two private airports and three military bases in Gujarat. Two more airports are under construction. There are three disused airports, one of them serving as a flying school. Gujarat State Aviation Infrastructure Company Limited (GUJSAIL) has been established by the Government of Gujarat to foster the development of aviation infrastructure in Gujarat.

== Contents ==
This list contains the following information:

1. Area served – Town or city where the airport is located. This may not always be an exact location as some airports are situated in the periphery of the town/city they serve.
2. ICAO – The four letter airport code assigned by the International Civil Aviation Organization. ICAO codes for India start with VA (West Zone - Mumbai Center), VE (East Zone - Kolkata Center), VI (North Zone - Delhi Center) and VO (South Zone - Chennai Center).
3. IATA – The three letter airport code assigned by the International Air Transport Association
4. Airport type – Type of the airport, including the terminology used by Airports Authority of India, as per the first table below
5. Airport functional status – Functional status of the airport as per the second table below

Airport Type	Description
International	Airport which handles both international and domestic traffic.
International (CE)	A civil enclave airport primarily used by Indian Armed Forces but has separate commercial terminal(s) to handle international and domestic traffic.
Customs	Airport with customs checking and clearance facility and handles domestic traffic throughout the year. A very limited number of international flights also operate from some of these customs airports for a limited period of time.
Domestic	Airport which handles only domestic traffic.
Domestic (CE)	A civil enclave airport primarily used by Indian Armed Forces but has separate commercial terminal(s) to handle domestic traffic.
State/Private	An airport under the control of state governments and/or private entities. An airport, airfield or airstrip owned by individuals, trusts and corporations and are for private use only.
Defence	An airfield under the control of Indian Armed Forces where commercial and private flights do not operate. The ones listed here are apart from Air Force Stations, Naval Air Stations & Air Force Training Facilities.

Airport functional status	Description
Operational	Implies airport has active commercial service for public use airports
Closed	Implies airport can no longer be operational for commercial service
Proposed or Under construction	Implies airport is proposed or under construction

== List ==
The list includes international, domestic, military and non-operational airports with their respective ICAO and IATA codes.

Area Served	Airport Name	IATA	ICAO	Airport Type	Operational	Owned/Operated by	Ref(s)
Ahmedabad	Sardar Vallabhbhai Patel International Airport	AMD	VAAH	International	Yes	AAI and Adani Group	
Ambaji	Ambaji Airport	—	—	Domestic	Proposed	AAI	
Amreli	Amreli Airport	—	XAM	State/Private	Yes	Government of Gujarat	
Ankleshwar	Ankleshwar Airport	—	—	Domestic	Under construction	AAI	
Bhavnagar	Bhavnagar Airport	BHU	VABV	Domestic	Yes	AAI	
Bhuj	Bhuj Airport	BHJ	VABJ	Domestic (CE)	Yes	MoD and AAI	
Botad	Botad Airport	—	—	Domestic	Proposed	AAI	
Dahej	Dahej Airport	—	—	Domestic	Proposed	—	
Dahod	Dahod Airport	—	—	Domestic	Proposed	AAI	
Deesa	Deesa Airport	—	VADS	Domestic (CE)	Under construction	MoD and AAI	
Dholavera	Dholavera Airport	—	—	Domestic	Proposed	AAI	
Dholera	Dholera International Airport	—	—	International	Under construction	AAI	
Dhordo	Dhordo Airport	—	—	Domestic	Proposed	AAI	
Dwarka	Dwarka Airport	—	—	Domestic (CE)	Proposed	MoD and AAI	
Jamnagar	Jamnagar Airport	JGA	VAJM	Domestic (CE)	Yes	MoD and AAI	
Keshod	Keshod Airport	IXK	VAKS	Domestic	Yes	AAI	
Kandla	Kandla Airport	IXY	VAKE	Domestic	Yes	AAI	
Kevadia	Kevadia Airport	—	—	Domestic	Proposed	AAI	
Mandvi	Mandvi Airport	—	—	State/Private	Yes	Government of Gujarat	
Mehsana	Mehsana Airport	—	—	State/Private	Yes	Government of Gujarat	
Mithapur	Mithapur Airstrip	—	IN-0106	State/Private	Yes	Tata Chemicals	
Morbi	Morbi Airport	—	—	Domestic	Proposed	AAI	
Mundra	Mundra Airport	—	VAMA	State/Private	Yes	Adani Group	
Naliya	Naliya Air Force Station	—	VANY	Defence	Yes	IAF (MoD )	
Palitana	Palitana Airport	—	—	Domestic	Proposed	AAI	
Porbandar	Porbandar Airport	PBD	VAPR	Domestic	Yes	AAI	
Rajkot	Rajkot International Airport	HSR	VAHS	International	Yes	AAI	
Rajkot	Rajkot Airport	RAJ	VARK	Domestic	Yes	AAI	
Rajpipla	Rajpipla Airport	—	—	Domestic	Proposed	AAI	
Rajula	Rajula Airport	—	—	Domestic	Proposed	AAI	
Siddhpur	Siddhur Airport	—	—	Domestic	Proposed	AAI	
Surat	Surat International Airport	STV	VASU	International	Yes	AAI	
Vadodara	Vadodara Airport	BDQ	VABO	Customs	Yes	AAI	
Vadnagar	Vadnagar Airport	—	—	Domestic	Proposed	AAI	

Other disused airfields and airports owned by the Government of Gujarat are located at Chad Bet, Dhrangadhra, Wankaner, Wadhwan, Radhanpur, Khambhaliya, Morbi, Parsoli, Limdi. Most of them were developed by the erstwhile princely states during the period of British India. A disused military airstrip owned by the Indian Air Force is located at Khavda in Kutch.

New airfields are being planned by the GUJSAIL at Morbi and tourism and pilgrimage places such as Palitana, Ambaji, Dwarka and Dholavira. The Government of Gujarat has signed memorandum of understanding in 2016 with the Union Ministry of Civil Aviation for overhaul of 11 airports and runways at Surat, Bhavnagar, Jamnagar, Porbandar, Keshod, Junagadh, Amreli, Bhuj, Kandla, Deesa and Mehsana under the Regional Connectivity Scheme. The Airports Authority of India has planned an international airport at Dholera and proposed a domestic airport at Rajula and Rajpipla.

== Gallery ==
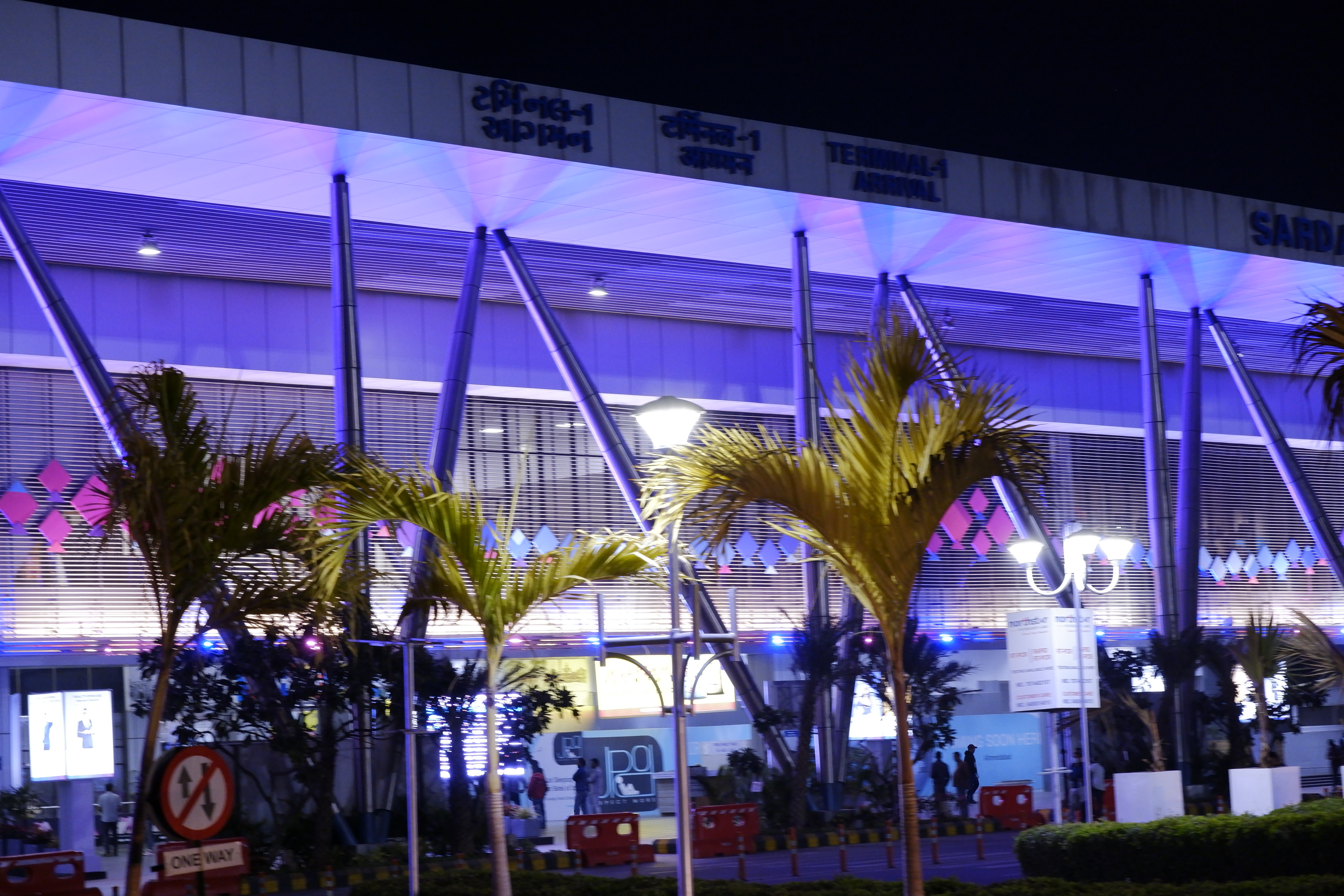
Sardar Vallabhbhai Patel International Airport, Ahmedabad, India

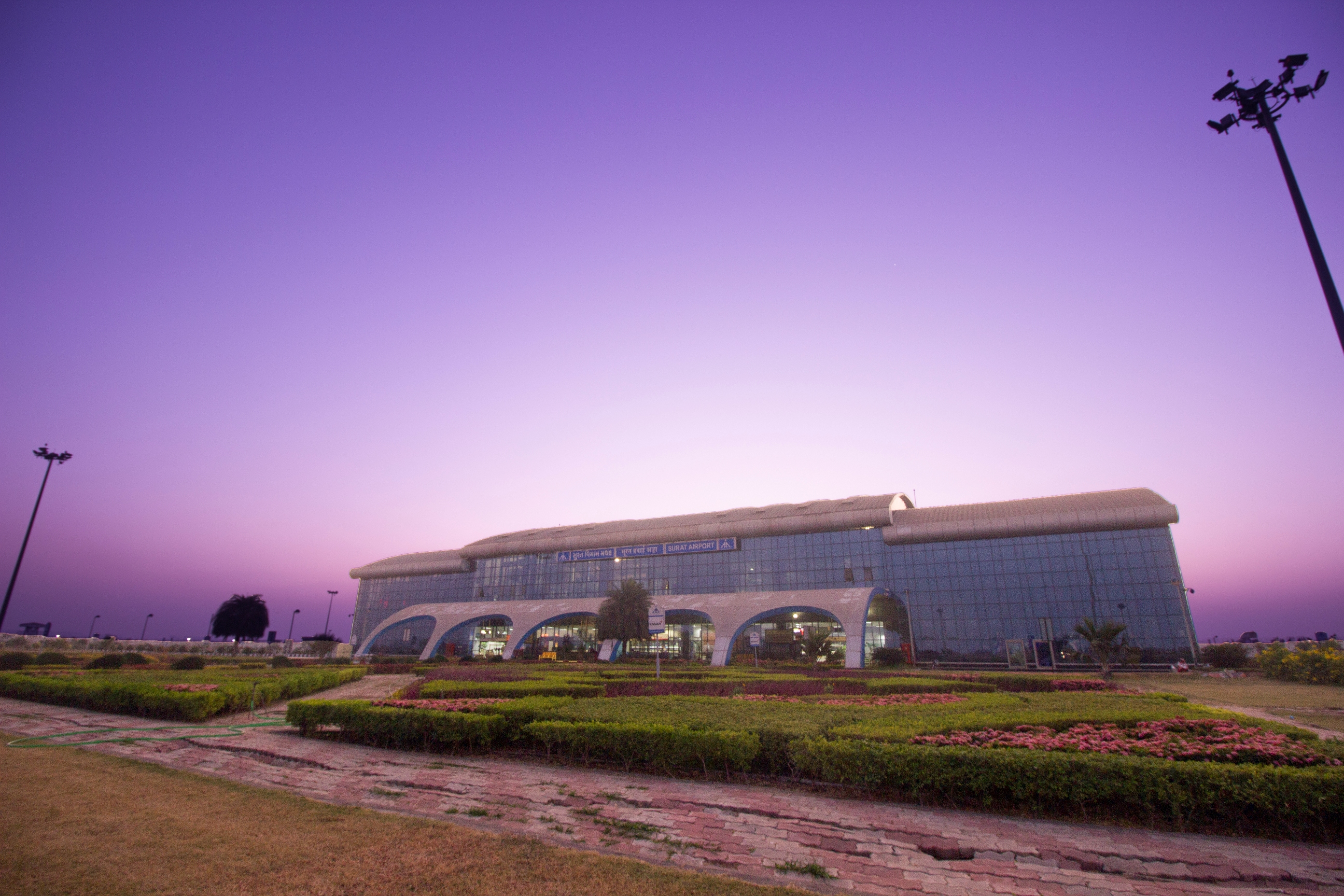
Surat Airport

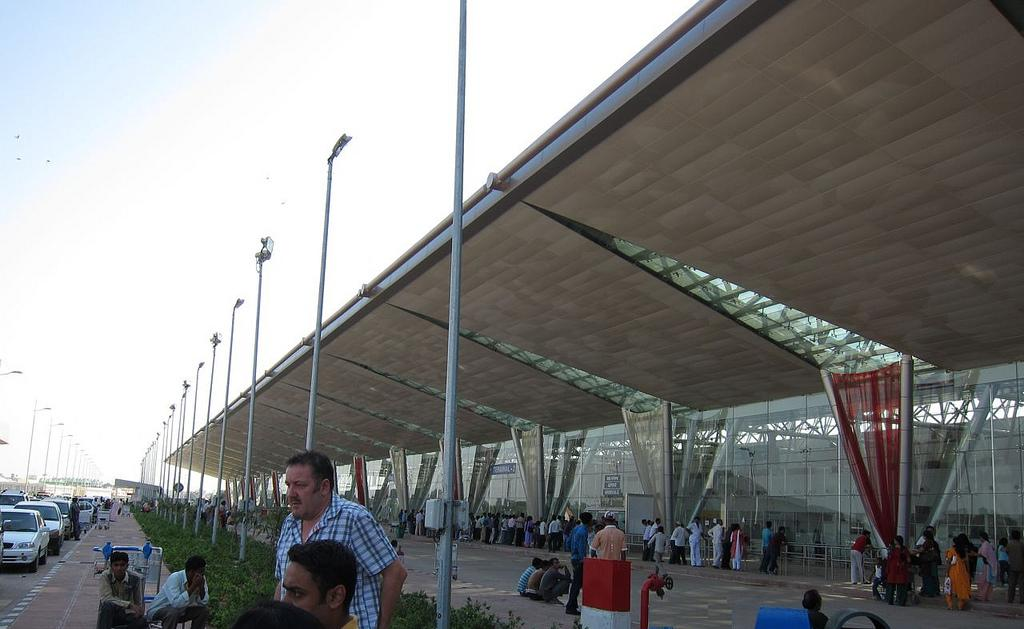
Terminal 2, Sardar Vallabhbhai Patel International Airport, Ahmedabad

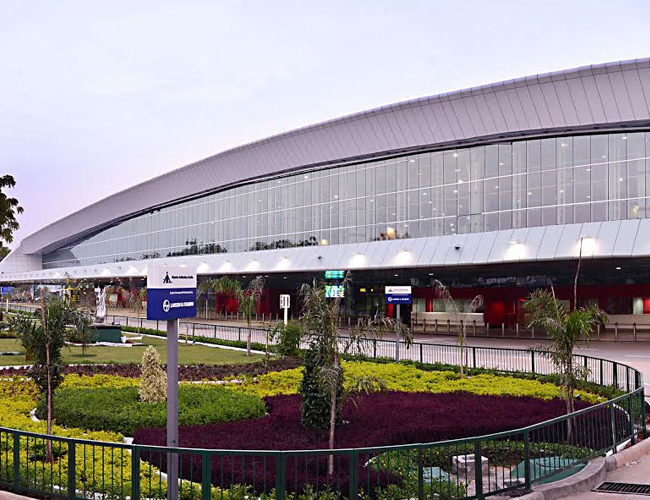
Vadodara International Airport

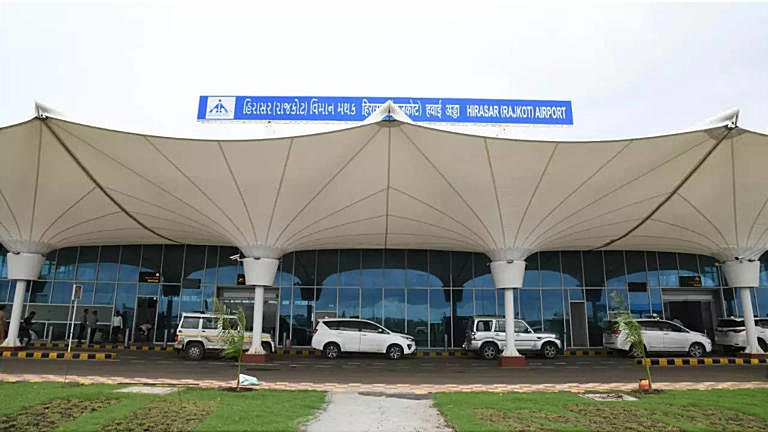
Rajkot International Airport

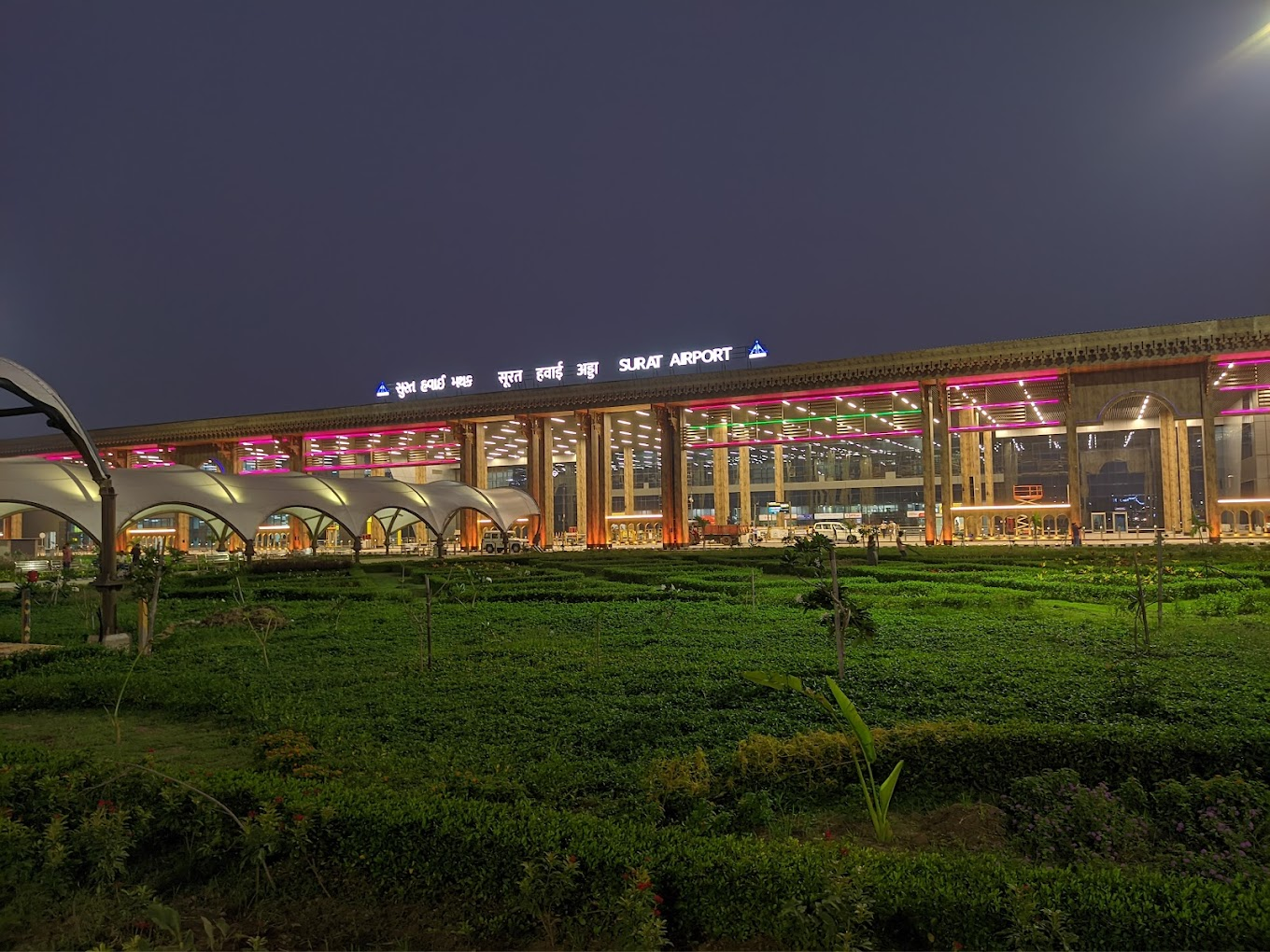
Surat International Airport New Terminal Building
