= Gujarat Airways =

Indian airline

IATA	ICAO	Call sign
G8	GUJ	GUJARATI
- Founded: February 1994; 32 years ago
- Commenced operations: July 1995; 30 years ago
- Ceased operations: 2001; 25 years ago
- Destinations: 17
- Headquarters: Vadodara
- Key people: Richard G Koszarek (Chairman)

Gujarat Airways was a private airline headquartered in Vadodara, India that operated from 1995 to 2001. It operated a fleet Beech 1900 aircraft on feeder routes in West and South India. The company slogan was Wings of Comfort.

== Destinations ==
- Andhra Pradesh
  - Hyderabad – Begumpet Airport
- Diu
  - Diu Airport
- Gujarat
  - Ahmedabad – Sardar Vallabhbhai Patel International Airport
  - Bhavnagar – Bhavnagar Airport
  - Bhuj – Bhuj Airport
  - Jamnagar – Jamnagar Airport
  - Kandla – Kandla Airport
  - Keshod – Keshod Airport
  - Porbandar – Porbandar Airport
  - Rajkot – Rajkot Airport
  - Vadodara - Vadodara Airport, base
- Karnataka
  - Bangalore – HAL Airport
  - Belgaum - Belgaum Airport
- Madhya Pradesh
  - Indore – Devi Ahilyabai Holkar Airport
- Maharashtra
  - Mumbai – Chhatrapati Shivaji International Airport
  - Nagpur – Dr. Babasaheb Ambedkar International Airport
  - Pune – Pune Airport
- Tamil Nadu
  - Coimbatore – Coimbatore International Airport
