= Amreli (disambiguation) =

Amreli may refer to:

- Amreli, a city in Amreli district
- Amreli (Lok Sabha constituency)
- Amreli (Vidhan Sabha constituency)
- Amreli Airport, an airstrip located in Amreli, India. It has a runway 1,260 metres (4,130 ft) long and was built by the government of Gujarat province
- Amreli district, one of the 33 administrative districts of the state of Gujarat in western India
