= IFCI Ltd =

Financial institution

IFCI, previously Industrial Finance Corporation of India, is a development finance institution under the ownership of Ministry of Finance, Government of India. Established in 1948 as a statutory corporation, IFCI is currently a company listed on BSE and NSE. IFCI has seven subsidiaries and one associate.

The company has played a pivotal role in setting up various market intermediaries of repute in several niche areas like stock exchanges, entrepreneurship development organisations, consultancy organisations, educational and skill development institutes across the length and breadth of the country.

The Government of India has placed a Venture Capital Fund of Rs. 200 crore for Scheduled Castes (SC) with IFCI with an aim to promote entrepreneurship among the Scheduled Castes (SC) and to provide concessional finance. IFCI has also committed a contribution of Rs.50 crore as lead investor and Sponsor of the Fund. IFCI Venture Capital Funds Ltd., a subsidiary of IFCI Ltd., is the Investment Manager of the Fund. The Fund was operationalized during FY 2014-15 and IVCF is continuously making efforts for meeting the stated objective of the scheme.

Further, the Government of India designated IFCI as a nodal agency for the “Scheme of Credit Enhancement Guarantee for Scheduled Caste (SC) Entrepreneurs” in March 2015, with the objective of encouraging entrepreneurship in the lower strata of society. Under the scheme, IFCI would provide guarantees to banks against loans to young and start-up entrepreneurs belonging to scheduled castes.

On 1 July 1993, it was reconstituted as a company to impart a higher degree of operational flexibility. Because there was NPA increase, and it was making loss, then gov privatised it. IFCI was allowed to access the capital markets directly.

In November 2024 the Government announced that it would be restructuring IFCI from a financial lender to an advisory firm, shutting down its lending options entirely.

== Functions ==
It provides financial support for the diversified growth of Industries across the spectrum. The financing activities cover various kinds of projects such as airports, roads, telecom, power, real estate, manufacturing, services sector and such other allied industries. During its 70 years of existence, mega-projects like Adani Mundra Ports, GMR Goa International Airport, Salasar Highways, NRSS Transmission, Raichur Power Corporation, among others, were set up with the financial assistance of IFCI.

== See also ==
- List of national development banks
