= Kandla Airport =

Domestic airport in Gandudham, Gujarat, India

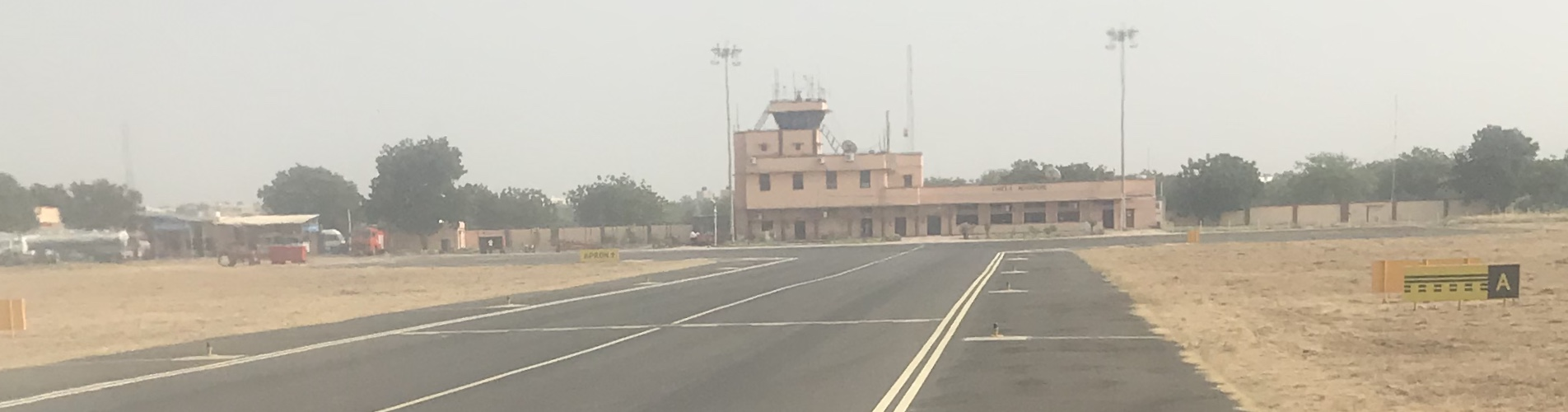
- IATA: IXY; ICAO: VAKE

Summary
- Airport type: Public
- Operator: Airports Authority of India
- Serves: Kandla, Gandhidham
- Location: Anjar, Gandhidham, Gujarat, India
- Elevation AMSL: 96 ft (29 m)
- Coordinates: 23°06′46″N 070°06′01″E
- Website: Kandla Airport

Map
- Location of airport in Gujarat IXY (India)

Runways
Direction	Length		Surface
Direction	ft	m	Surface
05/23	4,997	1,523	Concrete

Statistics (April 2025 – March 2026)
- Passengers: 29,963 (▼38.1%)
- Aircraft movements: 534 (▼35%)
- Cargo tonnage: 0 ( 0%)
- Source: AAI

Kandla Airport (IATA: IXY, ICAO: VAKE) is a domestic airport serving the cities of Kandla and Gandhidham in Gujarat, India. It is located in Anjar, 20 km (12 mi) northwest of Kandla and 7.5 km (4.7 mi) northwest of Gandhidham.

== History ==
The airport was built in the late 1950s. Indian Airlines commenced passenger operations by deploying Douglas DC-3 aircraft, and later in 1960 using their Fokker F-27 Friendship aircraft and by Hawker Siddeley HS 748 aircraft, and was also followed by Vayudoot. Gujarat Airways also used to operate flights to Mumbai until the airline ceased operations in 1999. After a gap of seven years, commercial services resumed in October 2006 with Air Deccan operating daily services to Mumbai, using an ATR-72 aircraft, until the airline ceased operations in 2012. After five years, SpiceJet commenced service again in July 2017 using the Bombardier Q400 aircraft to Mumbai, and to Delhi from 2021.

== Notable people ==
Farhan Memon is a poet and Lyricist who works in Bollywood and Gujarati Movies born in Anjar Kutch. He wrote lyrics for many hit songs including 'Rang Dariya' from movie CHEHRE Starring Amitabh Bachchan and Emraan Hashmi. He worked at Kandla Airport several years.

== Facilities ==
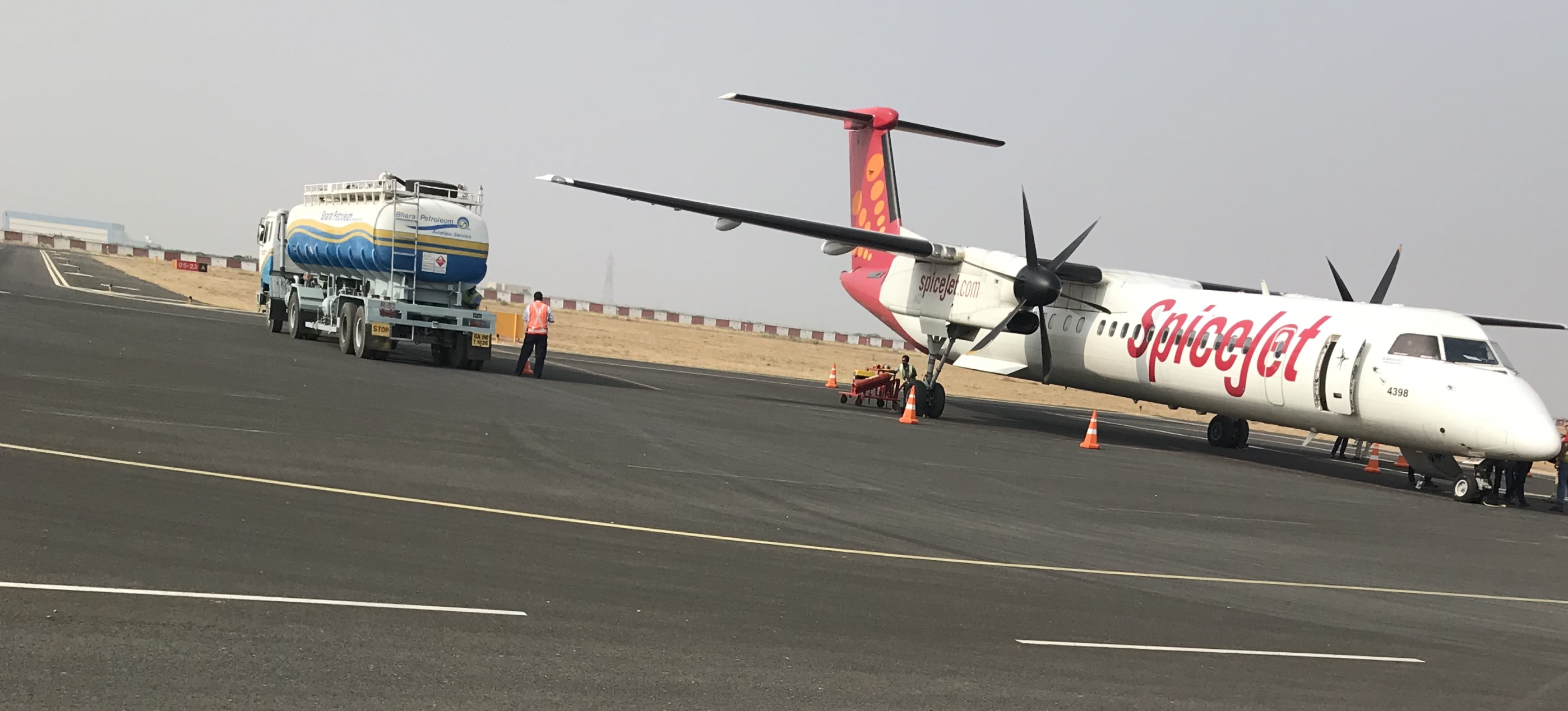
Apron area of the airport

The airport is spread over an area of 268.2 acres, and has a terminal building capable of handling 100 passengers at a time. Its apron measuring 90 m x 60 m has two parking bays for ATR-72 type aircraft. The airport has navigational facilities and landing aids like NDB and PAPI.

== Airlines and destinations ==
Airlines	Destinations
SpiceJet	Mumbai

== See also ==
- List of airports in Gujarat
