= Mundra Port =

Container port in Gujarat, India

Mundra Port મુન્દ્રા બંદર
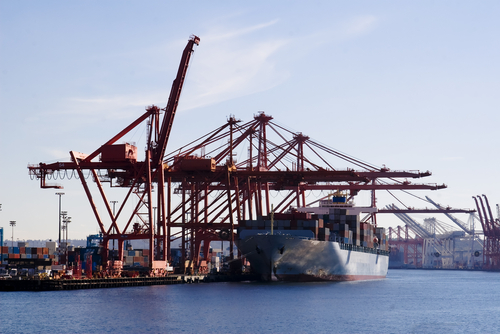
- Interactive map of Mundra Port મુન્દ્રા બંદર
- Location within India

Location
- Country: India
- Location: Mundra, Kutch district, Gujarat
- Coordinates: 22.746°N 69.700°E

Details
- Opened: 1998
- Operated by: Adani Ports & SEZ Limited (APSEZ)
- Owned by: Adani Group
- No. of berths: 24
- CEO: Karan Adani
- Terminals: 10

Statistics
- Annual cargo tonnage: 155 million tonnes (2022–23)
- Annual container volume: 5.65 million TEU (2020-21)
- Website adaniports.com/mundra

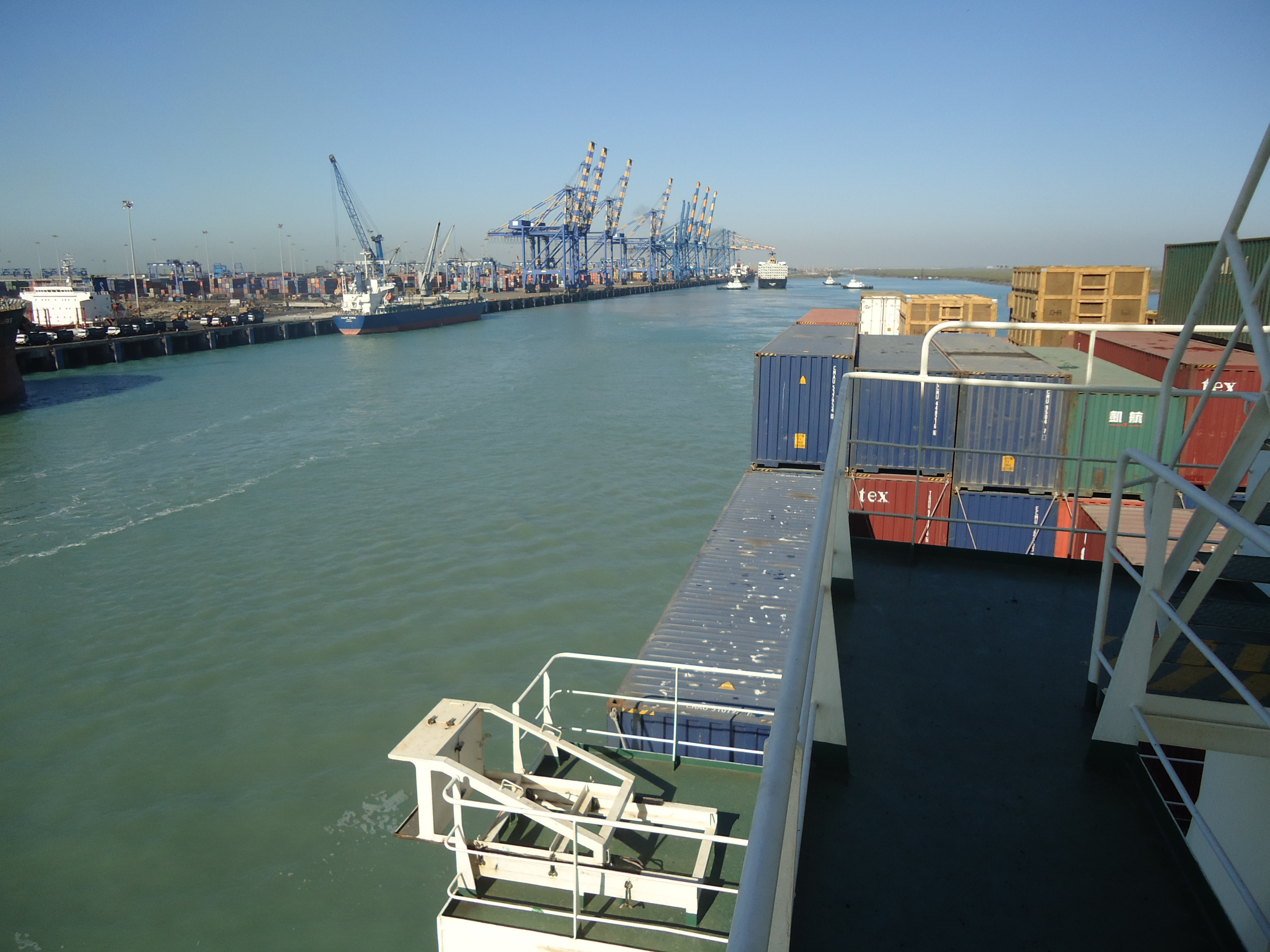
Cargo terminal of Mundra Port

Mundra Port is the largest commercial and container port in India, located on the northern shores of the Gulf of Kutch near Mundra, Kutch district, Gujarat. It is India's first private port, formerly operated by Mundra Port and Special Economic Zone Limited (MPSEZ) under the ownership of the Adani Group. It was later expanded to become Adani Ports & SEZ Limited (APSEZ), managing several port projects. In FY 2020–21, Mundra Port handled 144.4 million tonnes of cargo. The port currently handles over 155 MT, the highest in India, which constitutes nearly 11 per cent of India’s total annual maritime cargo. The port also handles nearly 33 per cent of India’s container traffic.

== History ==
The Port of Mundra is a private port and is also a special economic zone. Incorporated in 1998 as Gujarat Adani Port Limited (GAPL), the company began operating in 2001. The combined company was renamed Mundra Port and Special Economic Zone Limited.It was financed by IFCI.

=== Port history ===
In 1994, the Gujarat Maritime Board (GMB) approved setting up a captive jetty at the Port of Mundra. In 1998, a joint-sector company, the Gujarat Adani Port Ltd., was incorporated and multi-purpose berths 1 and 2 at Terminal I began operating. MT Alpha-2, a small tanker was the first ship anchored on 7 October 1998. In 1999, multi-purpose berths 3 and 4 opened at Terminal I.

In 2001, the Port of Mundra signed a concession agreement with GMB for development, operation, and maintenance of the port at Mundra. Also in 2001, the private Mundra-Adipur railway line was completed and in 2002, it was integrated with the Indian Railways.

In 2002, Guru Govind Singh Refineries Ltd. signed an agreement with the Port of Mundra to handle crude oil in the port. In 2002, additional agreements were signed with Indian Oil Corporation Limited to set up a single-point mooring facility and handle crude oil at Mundra. In 2003, a sub-concession agreement was signed to add a container terminal in the Port of Mundra, and the terminal began operating that year. In 2005, Adani Port Limited and Gujarat Adani Port Limited were merged. In late 2005, the single-point mooring became operational.

The Mundra Special Economic Zone was incorporated in 2003. It became India's first multi-product port-based special economic zone. Two new berths at Terminal II became operational to handle bulk cargo. A double-stack container train began to operate. The Mundra Special Economic Zone Ltd. and Adani Chemicals Limited were merged with Gujarat Adani Port Ltd., and the company name was changed to Mundra Port and Special Economic Zone Limited (MPSEZ) in 2006.

In 2007, two more berths for bulk cargo were added at Terminal II, and the terminal trial run operations began. A service agreement was signed with Tata Power to produce power for handling coal cargo imports. Also in 2007, equity shares in MPSEZ were offered to the public and employees and were listed on the National Stock Exchange and Bombay Stock Exchange. A service agreement was signed in 2008 with Maruti Suzuki India Ltd. to handle exports of automobiles.

MPSEZ expanded its port operations and changed its name to "Adani Ports and Special Economic Zone Limited" (APSEZ) on January 6, 2012.

The port is part of the Maritime Silk Road that runs from the Chinese coast to the Mediterranean, and via the Upper Adriatic region to Central Europe and the North Sea.

== Port ==
The multi-purpose terminals contain nine berths of a total 1.8 thousand meters long with alongside depths ranging from 9 to 16.5 meters. Berth 1 is 275 meters long with alongside depth of 15.5 meters and can accommodate vessels to 75 thousand DWT. Berth 2 is 180 meters long with alongside depth of 13 meters and can accommodate vessels to 30 thousand DWT. Accommodating vessels to 60 thousand DWT, Berths 3 and 4 are each 225 meters long; Berth 3 has alongside depth of 14 meters, and Berth 4 has alongside depth of 12 meters. Berths 5 and 6 are each 250 meters long with alongside depth of 14 meters, and both can accommodate vessels to 150 thousand DWT. Berths 7 and 8 are each 175 meters long with alongside depth of 12 meters and can accommodate vessels to 40 thousand DWT. The Barge Berth is 80 meters long with alongside depth of 6 meters and capacity for vessels of 2500 DWT.

The Mundra Port offers 21 closed dockside warehouses with capacity for 1.37 lakh (137 thousand) square meters to store wheat, sugar, rice, fertilizer, raw material for fertilizer and de-oiled cakes. The port offers 8.8 lakh (880 thousand) square meters of open storage for steel sheets, coils, plate, clinker, scrap, salt, coke, bentonite, and coal. An additional 26 thousand square meters of open storage is available alongside the railway. The port also offers a wheat-cleaning facility with capacity to handle 1200 metric tons per day and a rice-sorting and –grading facility that can handle 500 metric tons per day.

The Port of Mundra is planning several additions and improvements. Two thermal power plants are under construction that will produce over 8,600 megawatts. A new terminal site is proposed to be located about ten nautical miles west of the current terminals at the Port of Mundra. The terminal will eventually contain three deep-water offshore berths and two sets of stackyards for coal, iron ore, and other dry bulk cargo.

Kazakhstan is considering to build a terminal at the Mundra Port to provide Indian goods direct access to Central Asia via the Iran-Turkmenistan-Kazakhstan railway line.

In addition, the Port of Mundra's basin on the south side of Navinal Island will be developed in two phases to enhance the chorkarmas. Scheduled to be completed in 2010, Phase IIA will include breakwaters, dredging, reclamation as well as construction of a basin container terminal, two roll-on/roll-off service berths, a craft berth, and support and back-up facilities. The railway line will be expanded, and a new dedicated berth will be added for liquefied natural gas. The Port of Mundra is also upgrading its road network, adding two lanes to the existing two-lane road.

Mundra Port is India's first multi-product port-based special economic zone (SEZ). The company currently has an annual cargo handling capacity 338 MMT as of February 2015.

The development of Adani Port & Special Economic Zone Limited was conceptualised by the entrepreneur Gautam Adani. Mundra Port was the first one to be developed in October 1998 with just one berth. In a short span of just 12 years Mundra Port achieved 10 crore (100 million) metric tonnes of commercial cargo in a year thereby becoming India's largest commercial port. Mundra Port has registered the fastest CAGR of over 35% in the port sector across India.

The Mundra Port is located in the Northern Gulf of Kutch, en route major maritime routes and connected through rail, road, air & pipelines. This makes it a preferred gateway for cargo bound westwards. The port has been designed to handle all types of cargo viz. containers, dry bulk, break bulk, liquid cargo and automobiles.

Mundra Port has a capacity to handle 338 MMT of cargo per annum – the largest amongst all operational ports in India. Mundra Port handled 14.44 crore (144.4 million) MT of cargo in the financial year 2020–21 and is the largest commercial port of India in term so volume of cargo handled.

Mundra Port has not only pioneered the concept of deep draft integrated port model, but also of port based SEZ. The multi-product SEZ consisting Mundra Port and its surrounding areas is planned to be spread over 135 square kilometres (13,500 hectares). Currently, notified Multi-product SEZ is spread over an area of 6,473 Hectare, with an additional 168 Hectares notified as a Free Trade Warehousing Zone.

== Milestones ==
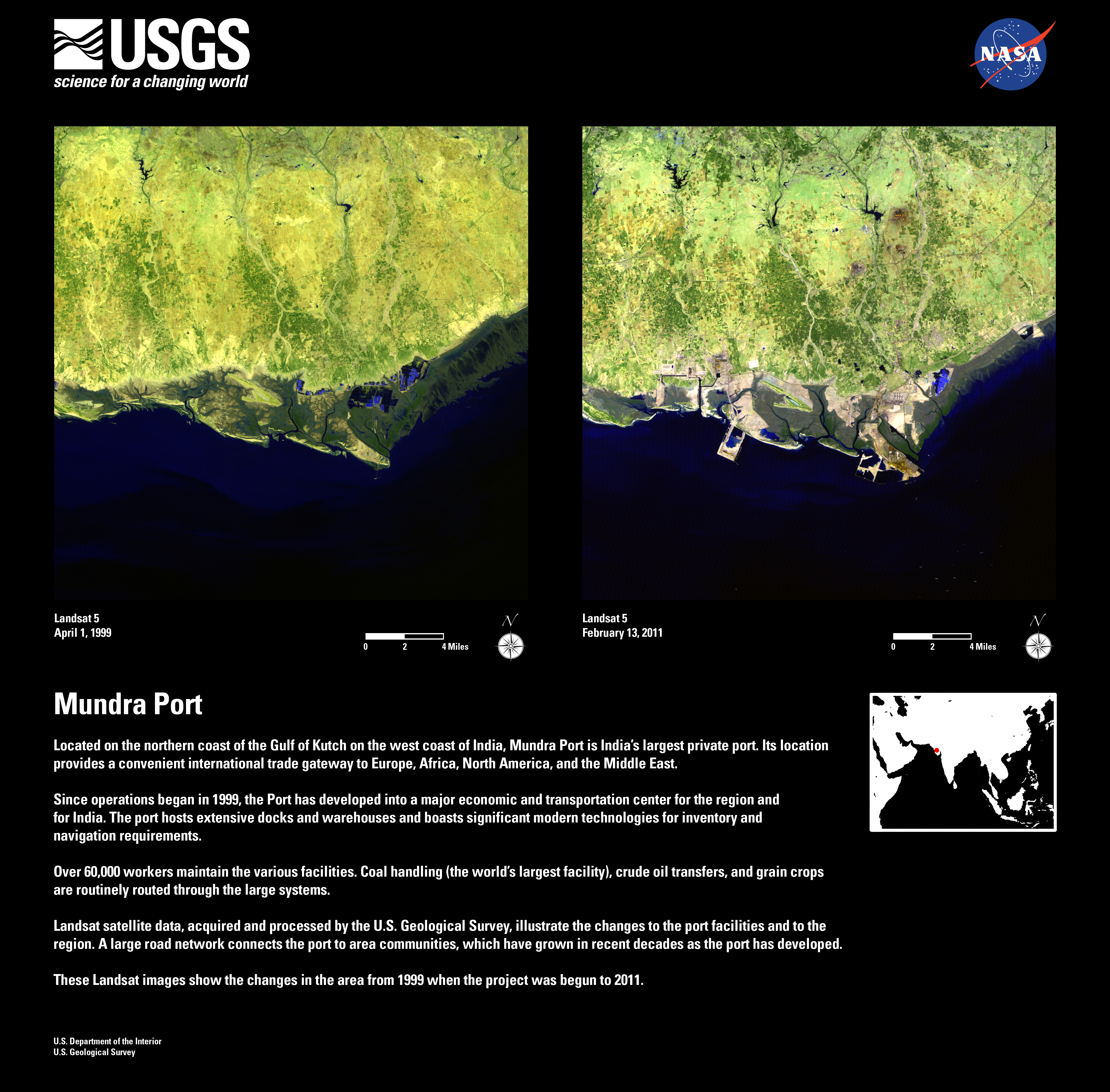
Mundra Port Aerial View 1999 to 2011

- 1998 October – Mundra Port commences commercial operations with one berth
- 2006 April – Notification issued for Special Economic Zone (SEZ) at Mundra
- 2007
  - Offer Initial Public Offer (IPO) for 40,250,000 equity shares of ₹10 each of Mudra Port and Special Economic Zone Ltd. to public and employees with price band of ₹400 – ₹440
- 2010
  - Constructed a four lane 1.5 km long dedicated RoB at a cost of ₹50 crore. This is the first private four-lane RoB within port area in India capable of withstanding a load of 100 MT to smoothen and speed up cargo movement
  - World's largest fully mechanised coal import terminal with 6 crore (60 million) tonnes per year capacity was put into operation
- 2011
  - Terminal Three commences operations
- 2012
  - Name changed to Adani Ports and Special Economic Zone Limited
  - Doubling of the rail connectivity between Mundra and Adipur completed. Mundra Port now has a private rail network of 117 km.
- 2014
  - Adani's Mundra Port crosses 100 MMT mark of cargo handling in a year. Mundra Port Ltd., India's largest port developer and operator is part of the Adani Group.

== Port layout and infrastructure ==
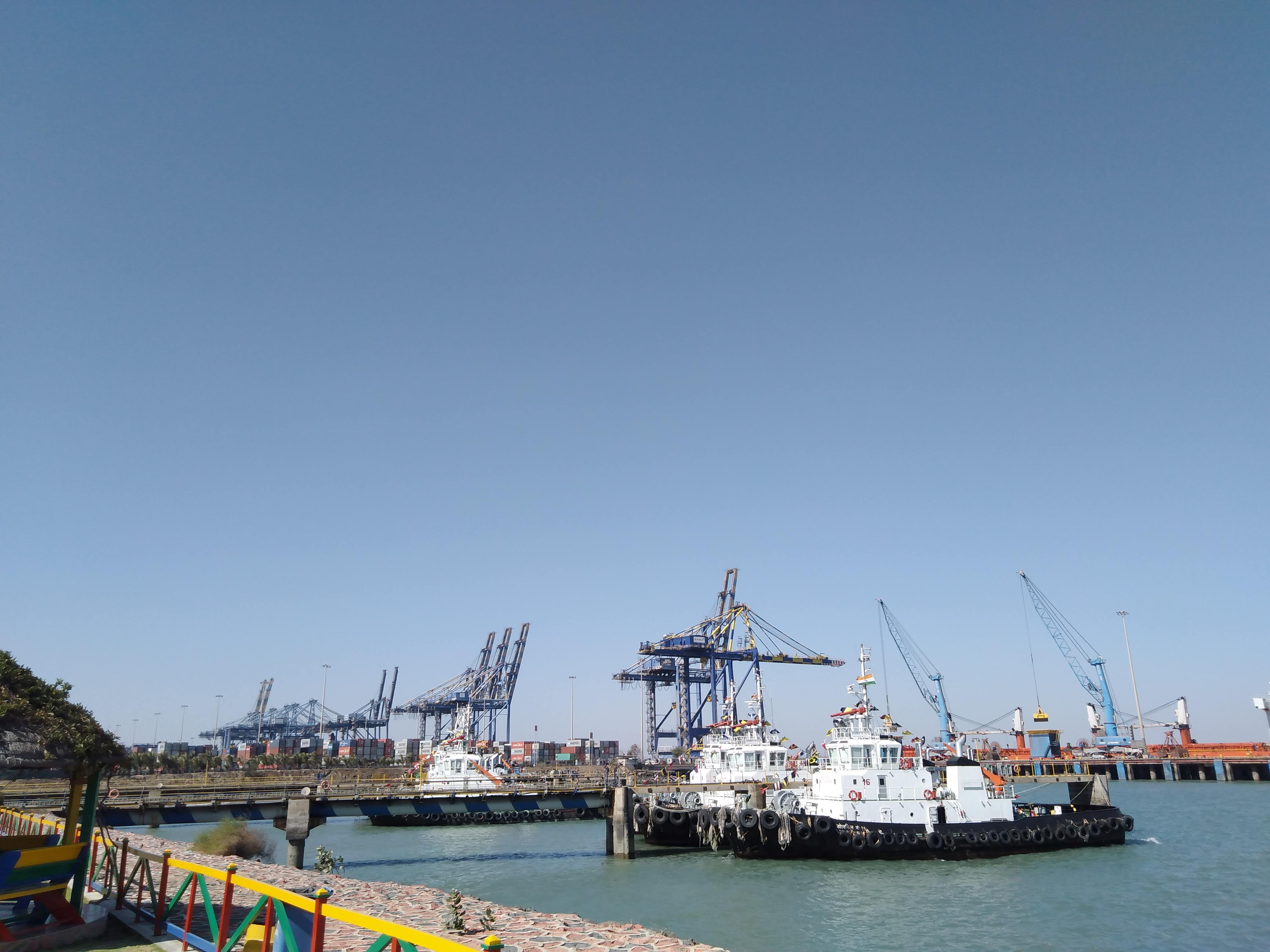
Port View from Tug berth side

The port has a deep draft that facilitates large vessels including fully laden capsize vessels to dock alongside its berth.

Mundra Port has commodity-specific storage areas. The port has 2,25,000 sq. meters of closed godowns and 3,150,000 sq. meters of open storage yards for storage of import or export cargo within the port premises. The Liquid Terminal at ASPEZ consists of 97 tanks of different sizes and attributes with a total storage capacity of 4,25,000 kiloliters for storage of various liquid commodities.

Mundra Port has also developed adequate infrastructure for evacuation of cargo keeping in mind the concept of the inverted funnel. According to the concept, the capacity of a port's evacuation infrastructure should be more than its marine infrastructure.

Mundra Port has developed commodity-specific infrastructure for handling, storage and evacuation of cargo. The Fertilizer Cargo Complex (FCC) is a fertilizer handling facility. The FCC has 2 operational lines with 44 bagging machines with a capacity to bag 660 nos. of 50-kg bags per minute and a capacity to load and evacuate 8–10 rakes per day i.e. 25,600 tonnes per day.

The steel yard is a steel storage area spread over 1,20,000 sq meters and consists of equipment for handling steel cargo. The steel yard is equipped with 8 Goliath cranes and 2 mobiles cranes with vacuum lift attachments, 6 forklifts with multiple attachments to handle steel coils, slabs and plates, 1 reach stacker and 60 trailers for internal transportation.

Besides the port area there is a large land area for development. A part of this area is now notified and functional SEZ which is now largest port based Multi product SEZ of the country. This SEZ is suited to service the hinterland of north and northwest India which account for two-thirds of India's GDP. The area is connected with National road, rail and pipeline network. Being spread over an area of 84 km^{2} it includes port, container terminals, rail, airport, container freight station and storage tanks.

Mundra Port is being developed as a business location for sectors like light and heavy engineering, project cargo, auto and auto component, textiles and apparel, pharmaceuticals dyes and specialty chemical, agriproduct processing, plastic processing, timber and furniture, global trading, metal and mineral etc.

It claims to have considerable distance advantage over other ports to most destinations in Rajasthan, Haryana, Punjab, Delhi-NCR, Uttar Pradesh, Madhya Pradesh, Jammu and Kashmir, Himachal Pradesh and Uttarakhand.

== Terminals and berths ==
The marine infrastructure at Mundra Port consists of ten berths for handling dry bulk & break bulk cargo, three berths for handling liquid cargo, six container berths including a Ro-Ro berth, three mechanised import cargo berths and 2 single point moorings for crude oil imports. The mechanised import cargo berths can handle vessels with maximum draft of 19 metres and other berths can handle vessels with maximum draft of 17 metres. The SPM facility offers a draft of 32 metres.

The port has its own fleet of tugs and pilots. Mundra Port also owns a fleet of dredgers to carry out the capital and maintenance dredging activities and thereby ensuring that Mundra Port has the deepest draft amongst all ports in India.

Mundra Port Coal Terminal is the world's biggest coal importing terminal. It can handle 4 crore (40 million) tonnes of coal annually. It was built at a cost of ₹2,000 crore (US$210 million).

== Port connectivity ==
Mundra Port offers inland connectivity via rail track, road network, airport and cross country pipelines.

=== Rail ===
Mundra Port Ltd. is connected with the Indian Railway network by a developed and maintained 76-km rail line from Mundra to Adipur. The rail infrastructure is capable of handling 130 trains per day including double stack container trains and long-haul trains.

=== Road ===
Mundra Port is connected to the hinterland in northern and western parts of India through the National Highway 8A Extn. & State Highways 6 & 48. The port has constructed a four-lane rail-over-bridge (ROB) in the proximity of the port to ensure that two modes of transportation i.e. road & rail, do not impede each other's movement.

=== Air ===
Mundra Airport is a licensed airport in 'private category' with air traffic control (ATC) which is operated by the Airports Authority of India (AAI). The nearest commercial airports are at Bhuj (65 km) and Kandla (60 km). The company plans to extend the current runway at Mundra to 4,500 metres. It has also installed a precision approach path indicator (PAPI), and approach and runway lighting for safe night landings for aircraft. Mundra Port plans to upgrade an international air cargo hub with night landing facility.

=== Pipelines ===
Mundra Port is connected to the northern hinterland with three cross-country pipelines. One feeds the IOCL Panipat refinery, second crude oil pipeline feeds Bathinda refinery and third is a white oil line which feeds the national capital region.

== Commodities ==
Adani Ports & Special Economic Zone Limited handles commodities including:

- Fertilizers like urea, DAP, MOP etc.
- Agri commodities like yellow peas, DOC, wheat etc.
- Liquid cargo including crude oil, POL, chemicals, edible oil etc.
- Steam coal, coking coal, containers, automobiles, steel cargo, project cargo and minerals

== Cargo handling ==
Mundra Port has a diverse cargo base including dry, bulk, break bulk, liquid, crude oil, project cargo, cars and containers. Mundra Port owns cargo handling equipment like mobile harbour cranes (16 nos.), grab ship unloaders (7 nos.), pay loaders, excavators and conveyor systems for handling of bulk and break-bulk cargo. Mundra Port also makes use of hired dumpers for transfer of cargo between berths and storage area.

Mundra Port has set up 9 docklines for transfer of liquid cargo from the jetty to the liquid tank farm. The container terminals at Mundra Port have a combined infrastructure consisting of 2.1 km of quay length, 18 rail mounted quay cranes, 48 rubber tyre gantry cranes and 17,400 ground slots and sands.

== Controversies ==
=== Violation of environmental norms ===
A committee headed by Sunita Narain of Centre for Science and Environment, was set up by the Union Ministry of Environment and Forests to inspect ship-breaking facility of M/s Adani Port and SEZ Limited near Mundra West Port in Gujarat's Kutch district. The committee which submitted its report on April 18, 2013 found incontrovertible evidence of destruction of mangroves, blocking of creeks and non-compliance of other clearance conditions. Subsequently, on July 29, 2013 a public hearing was held where people from four affected villages posed questions about the project and its impact on the environment.

== See also ==
- Container transport
- Nhava Sheva Port
- Kandla Port
- Vizhinjam International Seaport Thiruvananthapuram
