= Rajkot Airport =

Airport serving Rajkot, Gujarat, India

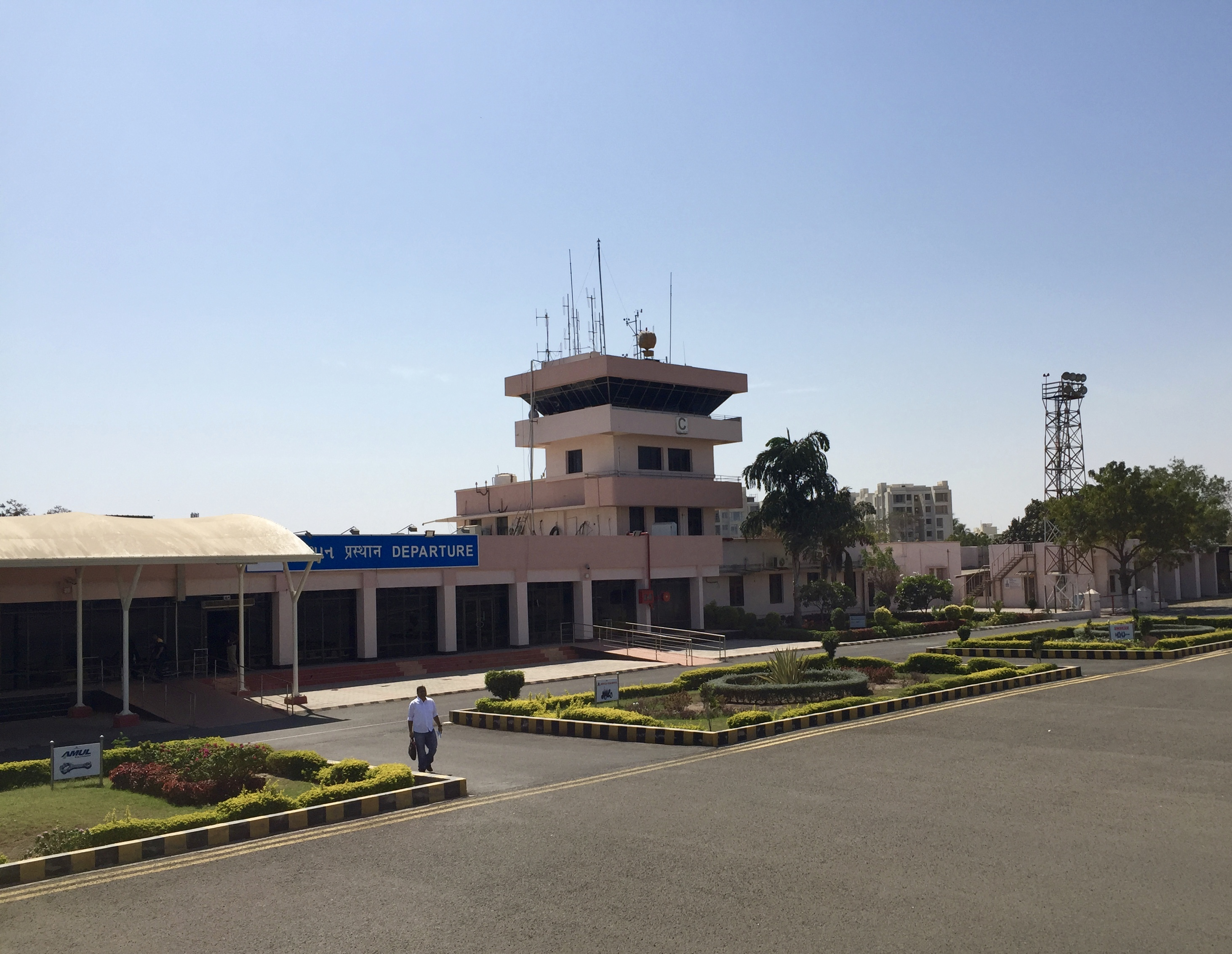
- IATA: RAJ; ICAO: VARK

Summary
- Airport type: Public
- Operator: Airports Authority of India
- Serves: Rajkot; Saurashtra
- Location: Rajkot, Gujarat, India
- Passenger services ceased: 10 September 2023; 2 years ago
- Elevation AMSL: 135 m / 443 ft
- Coordinates: 22°18′33″N 070°46′46″E

Maps
- Interactive map of Rajkot Airport

Runways
Direction	Length		Surface
Direction	m	ft	Surface
05/23	1,843	6,047	Asphalt

Rajkot Airport (IATA: RAJ, ICAO: VARK) is a public airport serving the city of Rajkot, Gujarat, India. It is operated by the Airports Authority of India (AAI). It was the 4th busiest airport in Gujarat after Ahmedabad, Surat and Vadodara until all scheduled commercial operations were shifted to Rajkot International Airport on 10 September 2023. As of 2026, the airport remains open for general aviation, including VIP/VVIP traffic.

== Development ==
In 2019, the AAI began building an apron for parking of four Airbus A320 and Boeing 737 type aircraft to reduce waiting time for passengers at the airport.

Due to the expansion of the city, the airport suffered from considerable capacity restraints because of the residential and commercial areas surrounding it. This rendered the plan to extend the runway beyond 1,800 meters infeasible, and the airport's hot climate compounded the airport's capacity constraints. As the airport was incapable of serving aircraft larger than Airbus A320 and Boeing 737 (which is the largest aircraft operating from the airport), a plan for an entirely new airport was launched.

== Airlines and destinations ==
All scheduled commercial flights were shifted to the new Rajkot International Airport in Hirasar on 10 September 2023.

== See also ==
- List of airports in Gujarat
- Rajkot International Airport
