= Manohar International Airport =

Airport serving Goa, India

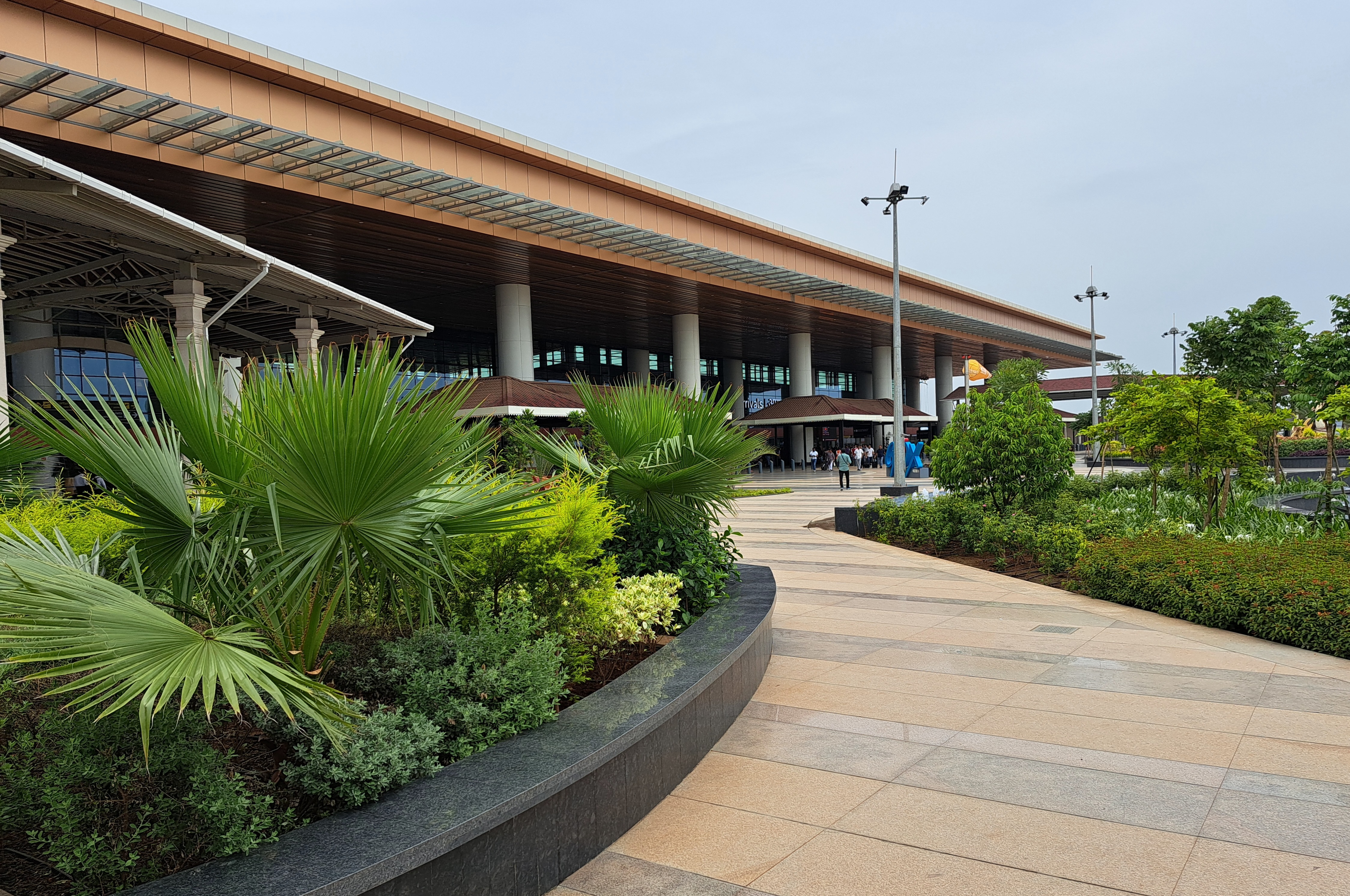
- Airport exterior
- IATA: GOX; ICAO: VOGA

Summary
- Airport type: Public
- Owner/Operator: GMR Goa International Airport Limited
- Serves: Goa
- Location: Mopa, Goa, India
- Opened: 11 December 2022; 3 years ago
- Hub for: Fly91
- Elevation AMSL: 552 ft (168 m)
- Coordinates: 15.7322°N 73.8680°E
- Website: Manohar International Airport

Map
- Location of the airport in Goa GOX (India)

Runways
Direction	Length		Surface
Direction	m	ft	Surface
10/28	3,750	12,303	Asphalt

Statistics (April 2025 – March 2026)
- Passengers: 53,76,516 (▲15.8%)
- Aircraft movements: 38,111 (▲21%)
- Cargo tonnage: 2,985.8 (▼ -11.9%)
- Source: AAI

Manohar International Airport (IATA: GOX, ICAO: VOGA), is an international airport at Mopa in Pernem taluka, North Goa district, in the state of Goa, India. It serves North Goa and the adjoining districts of Maharashtra and Karnataka and as a second airport of Goa after Dabolim Airport in Dabolim.

The airport is developed by GMR Goa International Airport Limited (GGIAL), a special purpose vehicle (SPV). It is built at a cost of ₹3,000 crore (equivalent to ₹35 billion or US$360 million in 2026). In financial year 2024–25, the airport handled over 4.6 million passengers, which is a little more than its current maximum capacity of 4.5 million passengers per year. On average, the airport handles around 100 aircraft movements and about 15,000 passengers daily. It is the 14th-busiest airport in India. It is named after the former Minister of Defence and the former Chief Minister of Goa, Manohar Parrikar.

The airport was completed and opened on 11 December 2022 and operations started on 5 January 2023 with the first flight by IndiGo. It was expected to be completed by the financial year 2019–2020, but was delayed due to a Supreme Court order that impeded work on site, and also due to the ongoing COVID-19 pandemic, which caused lockdowns, restrictions, and curfews, resulting in a lack of labor and delays in construction.

The airport is built under the Build Operate Transfer (BOT) model in four phases, with the first phase costing a total of ₹1,500 crore (equivalent to ₹17 billion or US$180 million in 2026). The airport will cater to 4.4 million passengers in the first phase and 13.1 million by the end of the fourth phase. The concession period for the greenfield project is 40 years, with a possible extension of another 20 years through a bid process, and the revenue share payable by the concessionaire to the government is 36.9%. The airport will operate on a hybrid model with 30% cross-subsidy, and the concession offers 232 acres of land for commercial city-side development for a period of 60 years.

== History ==
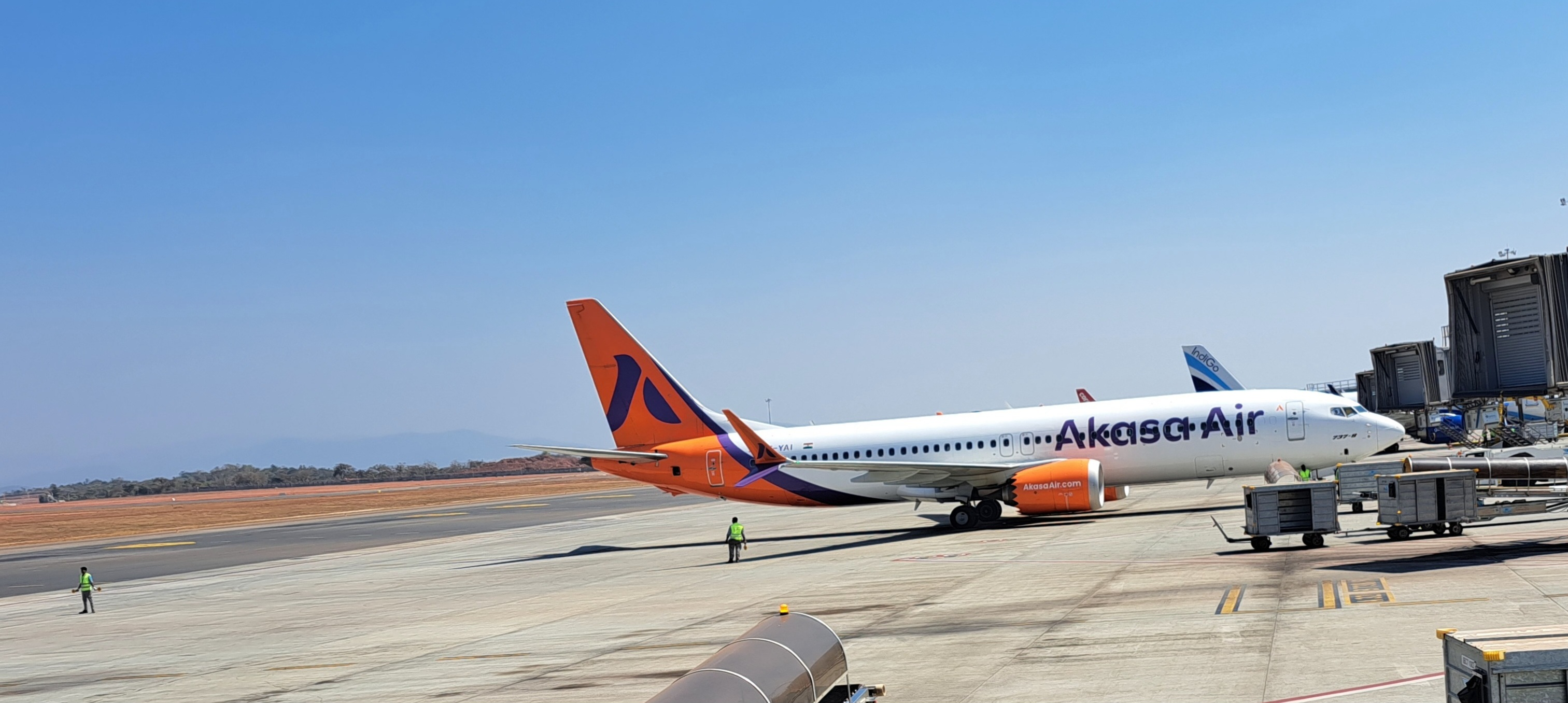
Apron area of the airport

Goa's current airport at Dabolim is a civil enclave operated by the Airports Authority of India (AAI) at a military airfield owned by the Indian Navy. Civilian and military operations share a common runway, resulting in severe airside congestion. This deters the long-term growth of civilian traffic at the airport.

It was Atal Bihari Vajpayee's flagship project. The Government of India had given its in-principle approval for a second airport in the state of Goa as early as March 2000. However, land acquisition issues and local litigation stalled the project for 14 years.

The ICAO's techno-economic feasibility report submitted in 2013, which projected air traffic of 10 million passengers at Goa by 2035, eventually established the feasibility of the Mopa project. The Goa Government issued a Request for Qualification (RFQ) for the project in October 2014. Five bidders, GMR Group, GVK Group, the Airports Authority of India (AAI), Essel Infra, and Voluptas developers, expressed interest. Essel Infra partnered with Zurich Airports, and Voluptas Developers, which belongs to the Hiranandani Group, tied up with Vinci Airports, Rome, to bid for the airport project. On October 28, 2015, the Ministry of Environment, Forest and Climate Change granted environmental clearance to the project. The Request for Proposal (RFP) for the project was issued in January 2016, seeking bids from interested companies to construct the airport. Two of the five companies that responded to the RFQ decided not to participate in the RFP. The bids were opened in August 2016. GMR Airports Limited, a subsidiary of GMR Infrastructure Limited, won the competitive bid to develop and operate the airport. The Airports Authority of India emerged as the second-highest bidder, followed by the consortium of Essel Infra-Incheon. In October, GMR Airports Limited formed the Special Purpose Vehicle (SPV) called GMR Goa International Airport Limited (GGIAL) to raise funds for, design, construct, and run the project. GMR Airports Ltd signed a concession agreement with the Government of Goa on 8 November 2016.

In 2016, the state government proposed to establish an aviation skill development center in order to provide employment opportunities at the airport to local youth. The concessionaire would be required to give preference to bona fide Goans for all jobs at the airport. This Aviation Skill Development Centre was initially to be set up by the concessionaire either at the Pernem ITI campus or any other ITI center. However, in 2020, the location of the proposed centre was shifted to the airport premises itself.

=== Project completion and Inauguration ===
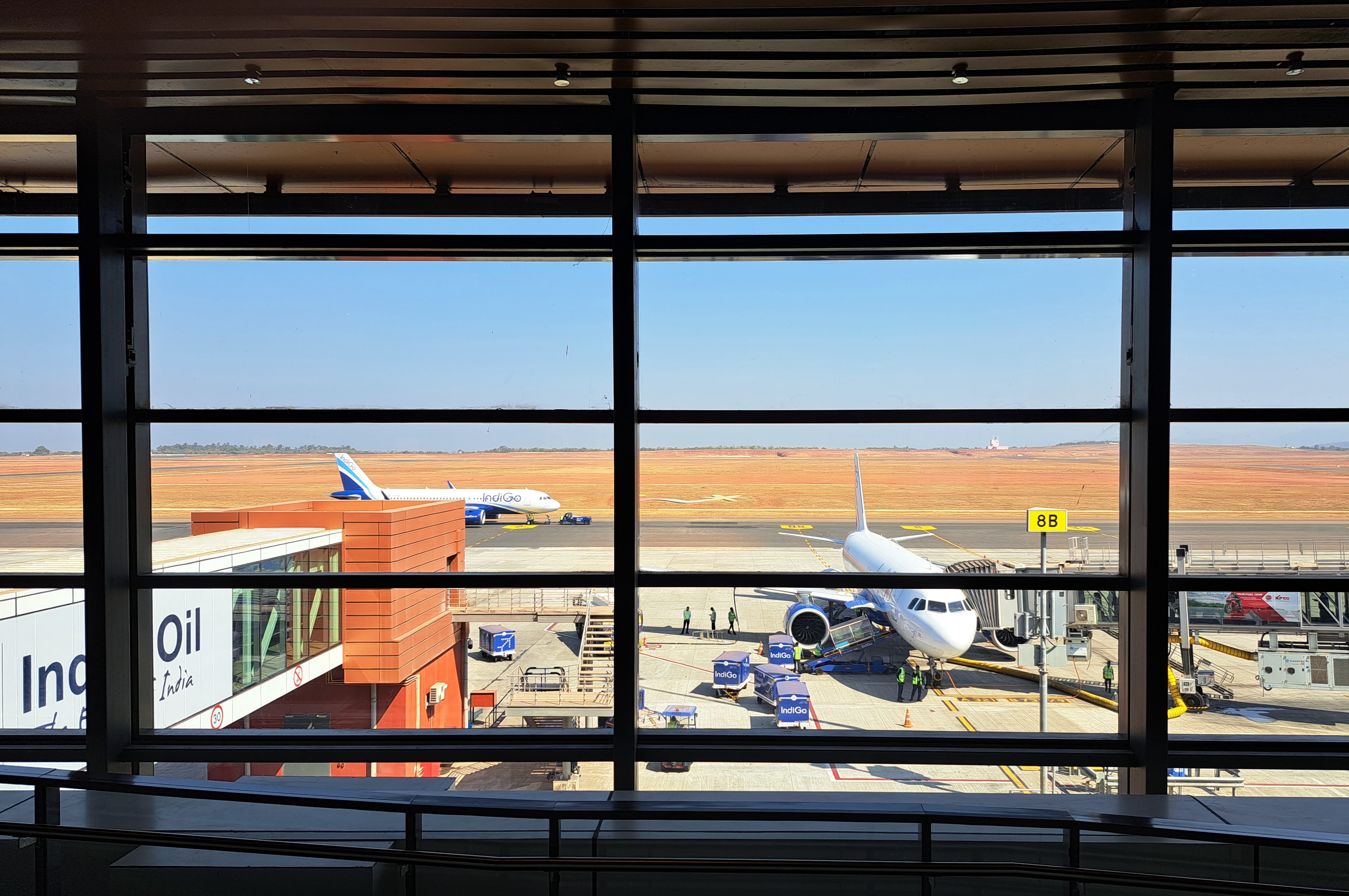
The apron area from the terminal

Prime Minister Narendra Modi laid the foundation stone of the project on 13 November 2016. The State Government acquired 78.41 lakh square meters of land for the airport from the villages of Casarvarnem, Chandel, Varconda, Uguem, and Mopa in Pernem taluka. In January 2017, the Goa Government declared an area within a five km^{2} radius of the airport as the 'Mopa International Airport planning area' for the purpose of regulating growth near the project area.

GGIAL and the Ministry of Civil Aviation (MoCA) signed a Memorandum of Understanding (MoU) in Delhi on 31 March 2017 for necessary support from the center to develop the airport. The master plan of the airport was also reviewed and approved by Engineers India through a separate contract earlier in 2017. GGIAL invited tenders for the Engineering, Procurement, and Construction (EPC) contract in June 2017, which was awarded to Philippines-based Megawide Construction Corporation in February 2018.

The Goa Government finally put its stamp on the project by enacting "The Goa (Manohar International Airport Development Authority) Act, 2018" on 5 September 2018. Subsequently, the Union Home Ministry gave security clearance for the construction in October 2018. On 18 January 2019, the Supreme Court ordered the Goa Government and GGIAL to maintain status quo on the project due to environmental impact. Construction of phase 1 of the airport was underway when the top court had given its order. The Court allowed resumption of construction work at the project site in January 2020. 50% of the airport construction had been completed by 2021, and 90% had been completed by July 2022.

On 11 December 2022, the airport was inaugurated by Prime Minister Narendra Modi and renamed to Manohar International Airport after former Defence Minister and the 10th Chief Minister of Goa, Manohar Parrikar. It opened for domestic operations on 5 January 2023, with the first flight operated by IndiGo. Air India became the first airline to begin regular international flights from the airport to London Gatwick Airport from 21 July 2023.

The airport is code 'E' compliant, featuring a 3.5-kilometer-long runway with Rapid Exit Taxiways. The airport has an Integrated Passenger Terminal Building, Air Traffic Control (ATC) building, meteorological facilities, a cargo terminal, ancillary facilities for processing and storage, aircraft rescue and firefighting services, and infrastructure for aviation fuel.

== Airlines and destinations ==
Airlines	Destinations
Aeroflot	Seasonal: Novosibirsk, Yekaterinburg
Air Arabia	Sharjah
Air India	Delhi, Hyderabad, Mumbai–Shivaji
Air India Express	Abu Dhabi, Bengaluru, Chennai, Delhi, Hyderabad, Mumbai–Shivaji, Indore, Patna
Akasa Air	Ahmedabad, Chandigarh, Delhi, Kolkata, Navi Mumbai, Mumbai–Shivaji, Pune
Fly91	Agatti, Bengaluru, Hyderabad, Jalgaon, Navi Mumbai, Pune, Solapur
FlyArystan	Seasonal charter: Almaty, Astana
IndiGo	Ahmedabad, Aurangabad, Bengaluru, Chennai, Delhi, Hyderabad, Jaipur, Kolkata, Mumbai–Shivaji, Nagpur, Navi Mumbai, Pune, Rajkot, Vadodara
Oman Air	Muscat
Qatar Airways	Doha
Star Air	Diu, Mundra, Nanded, Navi Mumbai, Shivamogga
TUI Airways	Seasonal: London–Gatwick, Manchester
Uzbekistan Airways	Tashkent

== Statistics ==
Operations and statistics
Year	Passengers	Airfreight (tonnes)	Aircraft
2022-23	6,64,160	12	4,841
2023-24	44,06,087	1,623	29,808
2024-25	46,43,852	3,389	31,500
2025-26	53,76,516	2,985.8	38,111

== Accessibility ==
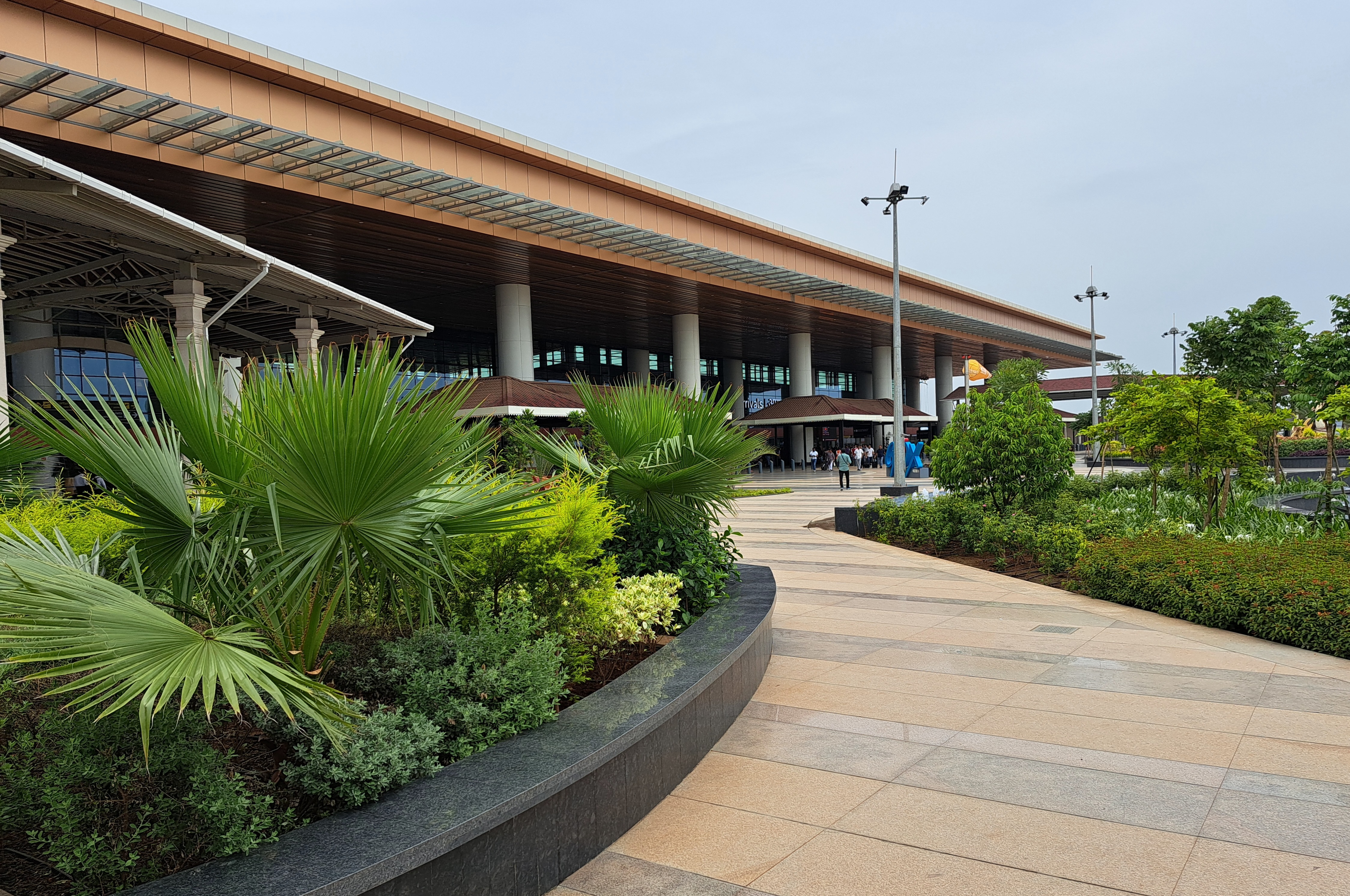
Mopa Airport Goa Exteriors

The airport is situated 8 km (5.0 mi) east of Dargalim off National Highway 66 (NH-66). A new national highway, designated NH-166S, has been built by the National Highways Authority of India (NHAI) to directly connect the airport with the NH-66 and the rest of the state and neighboring states. It was inaugurated by the Minister of Road Transport and Highways, Nitin Gadkari, on 12 July 2024, after about three years of construction. The 6.6 km (4.1 mi)-long, six-lane elevated corridor was built at a cost of around ₹770 crore (US$80 million). It allows passengers to access the airport from the highway junction within five minutes by bypassing local villages.

The nearest railway station is Pernem railway station, on the Konkan Railway. Ride hailing services such as Uber and Ola Cabs have yet to begin services in the airport. The state-owned Kadamba Transport Corporation operates bus services to the airport from Panaji, Mapusa, and Margao.

The airport will be directly connected with the nearby neighboring districts of Maharashtra and Karnataka via the proposed Nagpur–Goa Expressway by the next 4–5 years. The expressway, which will begin near Nagpur at Wardha district, will terminate at an interchange with the NH-66 at Patradevi, located about 20 km (12 mi) north from the airport on the Maharashtra–Goa border.

== See also ==
- Dabolim Airport
- Manohar Parrikar
