= Mehsana Airport =

Airstrip in Mehsana, Gujarat, India

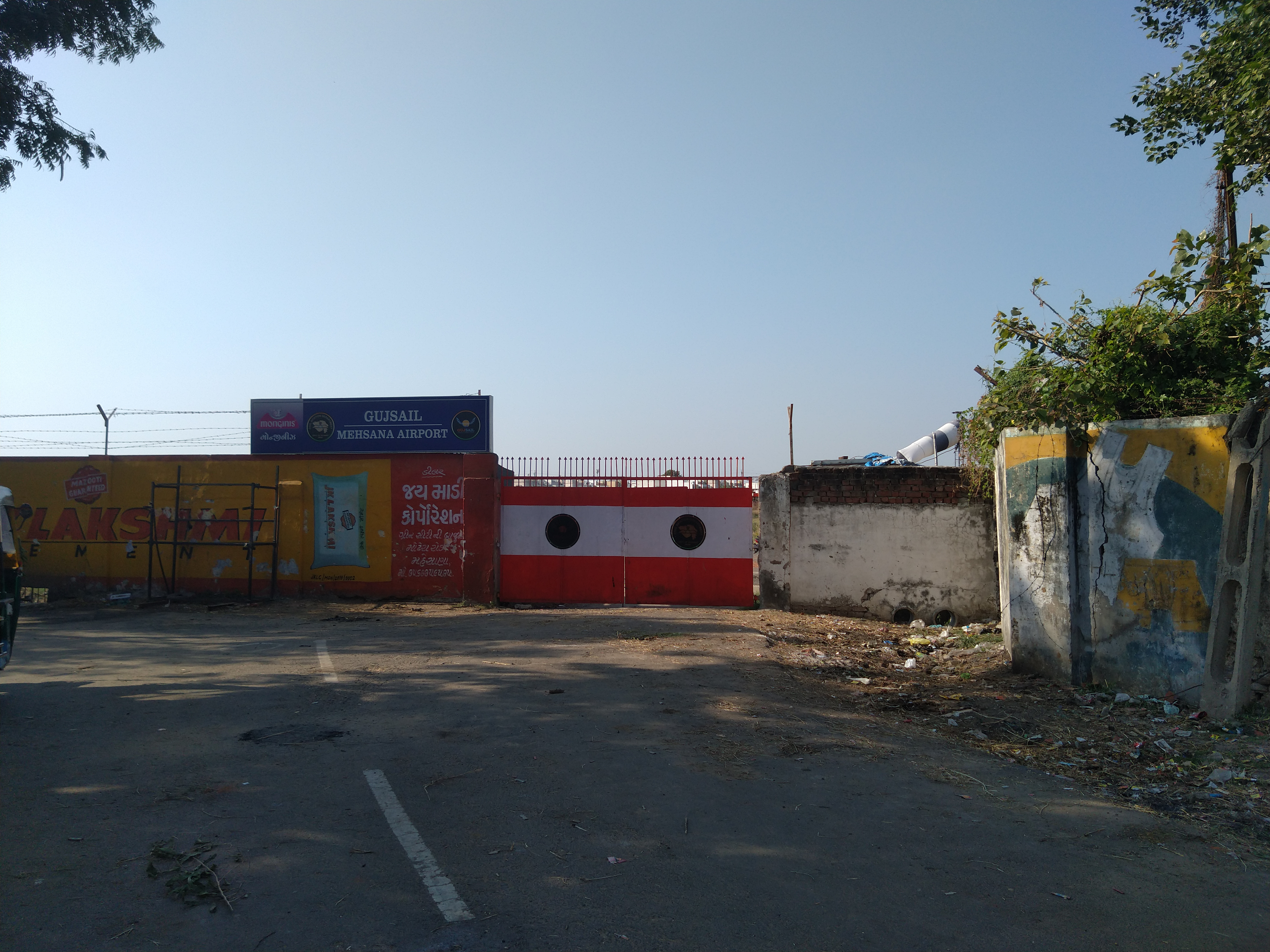
- Gate of Mehsana Airport
- IATA: none; ICAO: none

Summary
- Airport type: Flying school
- Operator: Government of Gujarat and Ahmedabad Aviation & Aeronautics Ltd.
- Serves: Mehsana
- Location: Mehsana, India
- Elevation AMSL: 276 ft (84 m)
- Coordinates: 23.603385°N 72.3750873°E

Maps
- Location of the airport in Gujarat Mehsana Airport (India)
- Interactive map of Mehsana Airport

Runways
Direction	Length		Surface
Direction	ft	m	Surface
05/23	3,280	1,000

Statistics
- Area: 64 acres

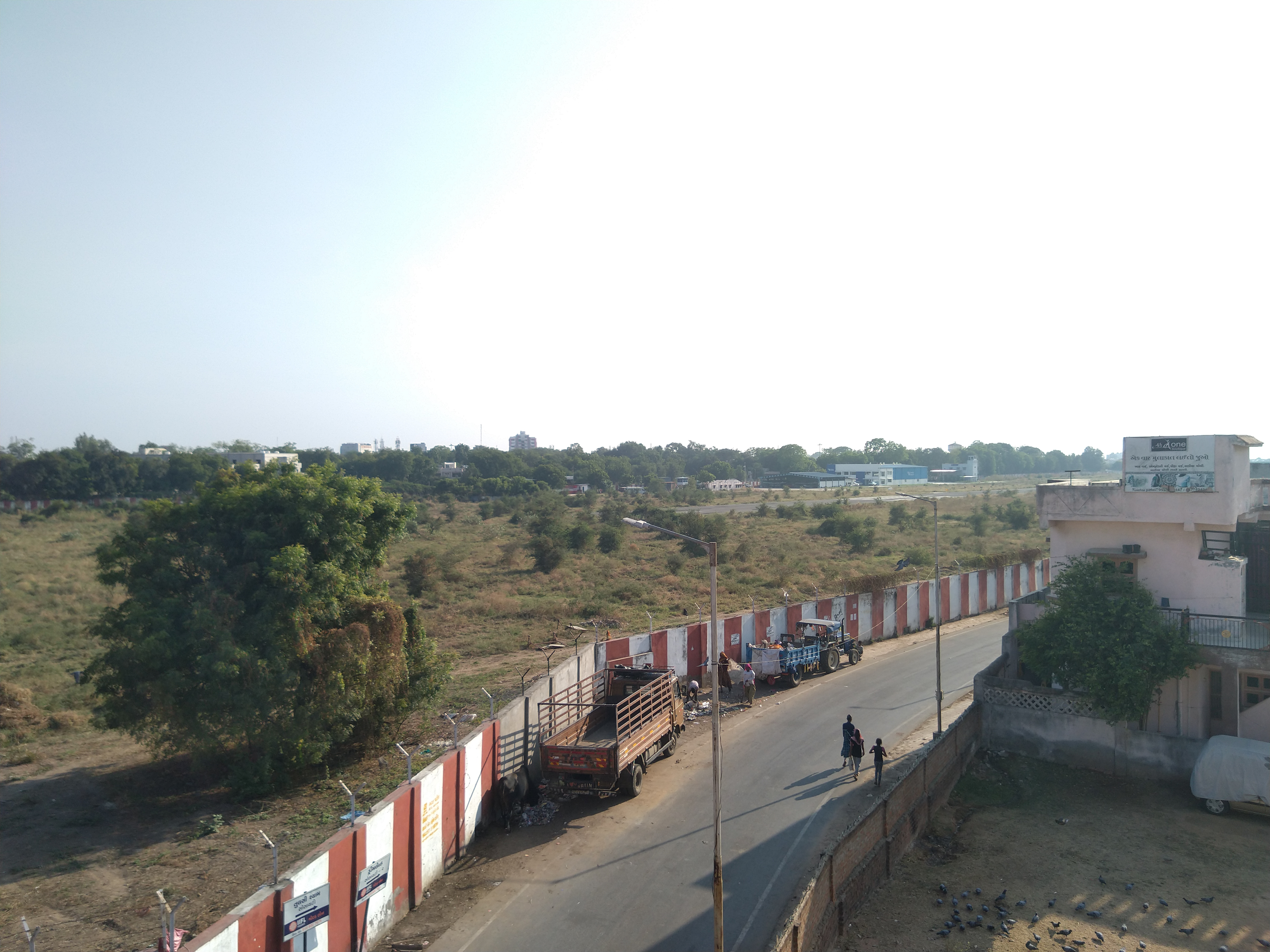
Airstrip of Mehsana Airport

Mehsana Airport is a civil aviation training base in Mehsana, Gujarat, India. It is used for non-scheduled operations.

An abandoned airfield was developed by the Government of Gujarat and a private company, Ahmedabad Aviation and Aeronautics Ltd (AAA Ltd) on a public-private partnership basis in 2007, the first such partnership in Gujarat. The 64 acre airport was developed with the help of the Indian Air Force and DGCA and was inaugurated by the Chief Minister of Gujarat, Narendra Modi. AAA Ltd used the Sardar Vallabhbhai Patel International Airport in Ahmedabad prior to shifting its training activities to Mehsana Airport in 2007.

The airport was at the centre of a dispute between its owners and the Mehsana Municipality, which closed access the facility twice in 2010 due to non-payment of taxes. However, AAA Ltd contended that it is not liable to pay the taxes stated. The facility was reopened after the Gujarat High Court ordered the same.

== See also ==
- List of airports in Gujarat
