= Rajkot International Airport =

International airport serving Rajkot, Gujarat, India

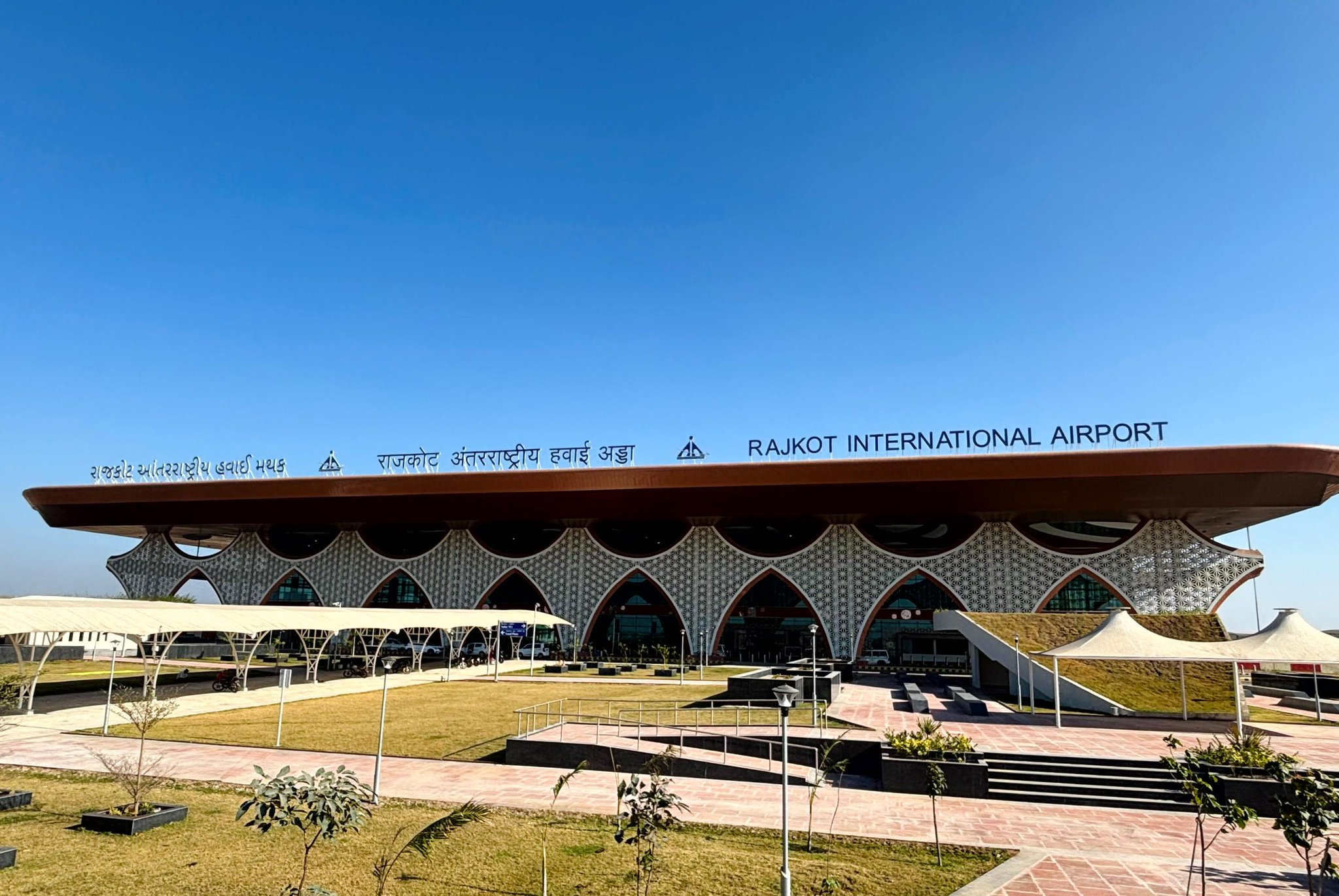
- IATA: HSR; ICAO: VAHS

Summary
- Airport type: Public
- Owner: Airports Authority of India
- Serves: Rajkot and Saurashtra
- Location: Hirasar, Rajkot district, Gujarat, India
- Opened: 27 July 2023; 3 years ago
- Elevation AMSL: 654 ft (199 m)
- Coordinates: 22°23′17″N 71°01′42″E

Maps
- Location in Gujarat HSR/VAHS (India)
- Interactive map of Rajkot International Airport

Runways
Direction	Length		Surface
Direction	ft	m	Surface
05/23	9,974	3,040	Concrete

Statistics (April 2025 - March 2026)
- Passengers: 12,46,996 (▲14.6%)
- Aircraft movements: 8,206 (▼ -1.1%)
- Cargo tonnage: 1121.8 (▲84.4%)
- Source: AAI

Rajkot International Airport (IATA: HSR, ICAO: VAHS) is an international airport and a greenfield airport at Hirasar, Gujarat, India, serving the city of Rajkot and the Saurashtra region of Gujarat. It is located near the National Highway 8B (NH-8B) connecting Ahmedabad and Rajkot. It has a single runway for the operation of ‘C’ category aircraft. The airport was developed by the Airports Authority of India (AAI) at a cost of ₹2,654 crore (US$280 million). The foundation stone for the construction of the airport was laid on 7 October 2017, and was inaugurated by Prime Minister Narendra Modi on 27 July 2023.

== History ==
The site clearance approval for the airport was granted by the Government of India in May 2017. Prime Minister Narendra Modi presided over the groundbreaking ceremony held on 7 October 2017. The Ministry of Environment, Forest and Climate Change (MoEFCC) accorded environmental clearance (EC) to the project on 10 October 2017.

Land acquisition issues delayed the tendering process by a few months. Afcons, Dilip Buildcon, Gayatri Projects, Larsen & Toubro and Reliance Infrastructure were among the bidders for the Engineering, procurement, and construction (EPC) tender floated by the Airports Authority of India (AAI). The financial bids were opened on 9 August 2018 and Dilip Buildcon emerged as the lowest bidder. The Cabinet Committee on Economic Affairs gave its approval for the project on 28 February 2019. Subsequently, in March 2019, Reliance Infrastructure was awarded the EPC contract worth ₹648 crore (US$69 million) to construct the airport. The construction was given a completion deadline of within 30 months. The contract also requires the contractor to provide operation and maintenance services for a period of two years following the commissioning of the project. The Central Government had initially sanctioned ₹1,405 crore (US$150 million) for the project, but revised the amount in June 2019 to ₹2,654 crore (US$280 million).

The airport was expected to be completed and opened on 31 December 2023. However, it was completed before time in the last quarter of June 2023, and was inaugurated by Prime Minister Narendra Modi on 27 July 2023.

According to an official notification published in the Gazette of India on 9 November 2026, the Centre has inducted both terminals into the Category-1 list of immigration airports to include Hirasar Airport at serial number 40.

== Infrastructure ==
The airport is capable of handling Airbus A380, Airbus A350, Boeing 777, Boeing 787 and Boeing 747 type of widebody aircraft, and has a rainwater harvesting system, solar power system and a green belt along its periphery to act as a noise barrier. It has a built-up area of 23,000 m^{2} (250,000 sq ft) and has an Air Traffic Control (ATC) tower, 4 aerobridges, an apron suitable for parking of 14 aircraft, 3 conveyor belts, 20 check-in counters, advanced firefighting systems along with modern and efficient passenger facilities. It will be capable of serving over 1,800 passengers during peak hours.The airport, measuring 2,534 acres (10.25 km^{2}), is situated 36 km (22 mi) from the existing Rajkot Airport, whose capacity is constrained and cannot be expanded because of urban growth around it.

== Terminal ==
=== Passenger Terminal ===
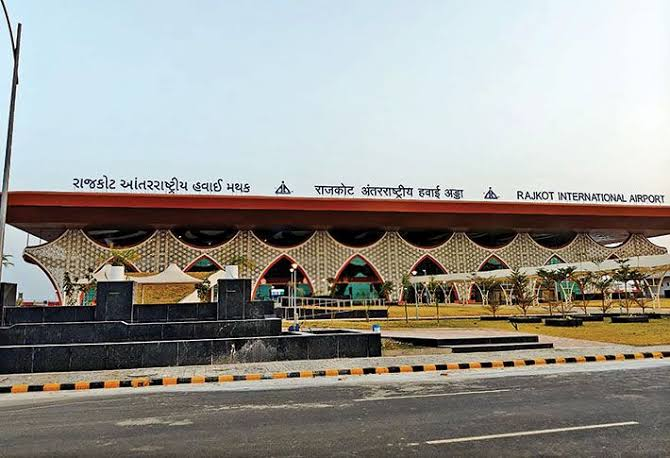
Exterior view of the passenger terminal

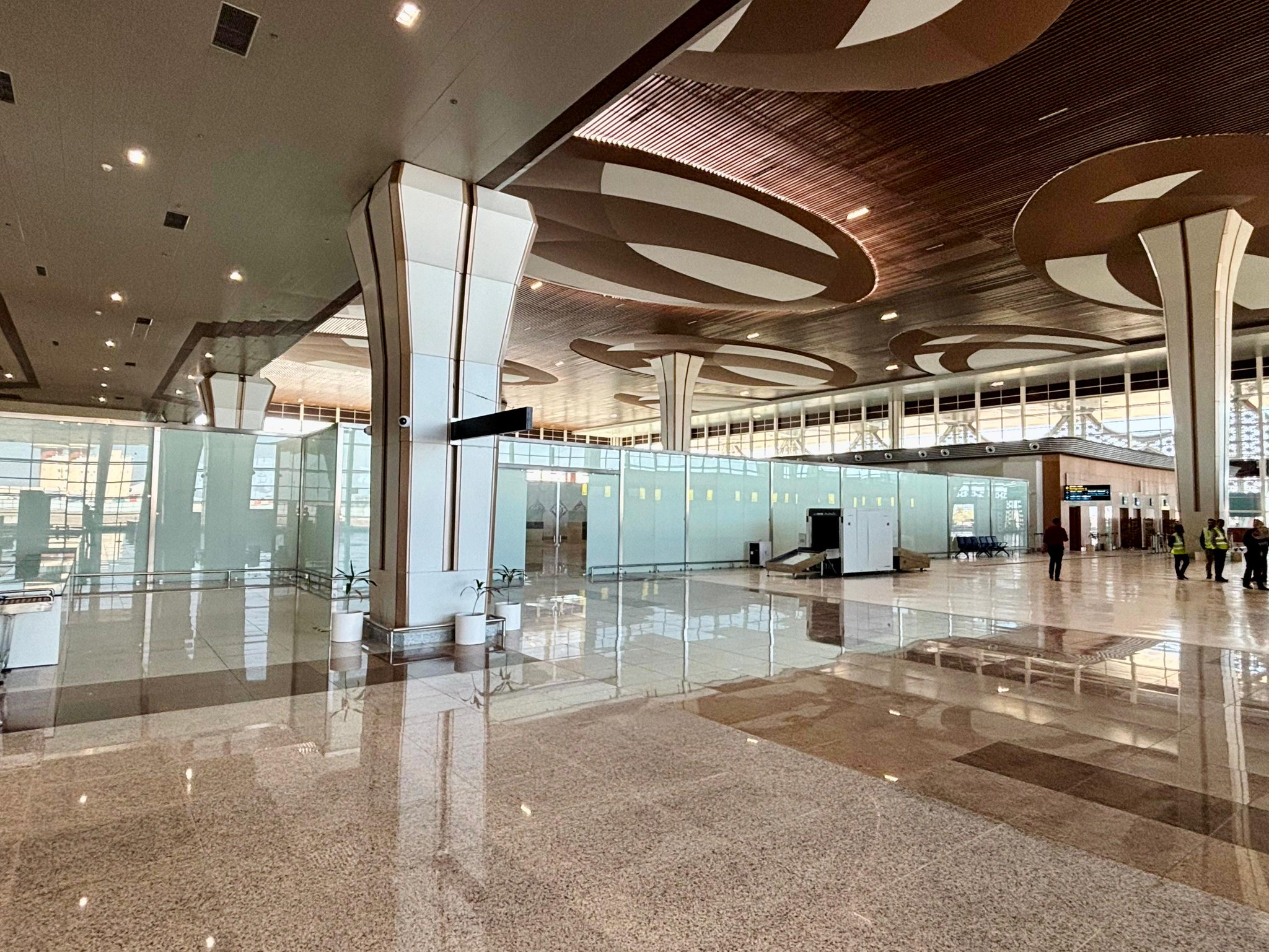
Interior view of the passenger terminal

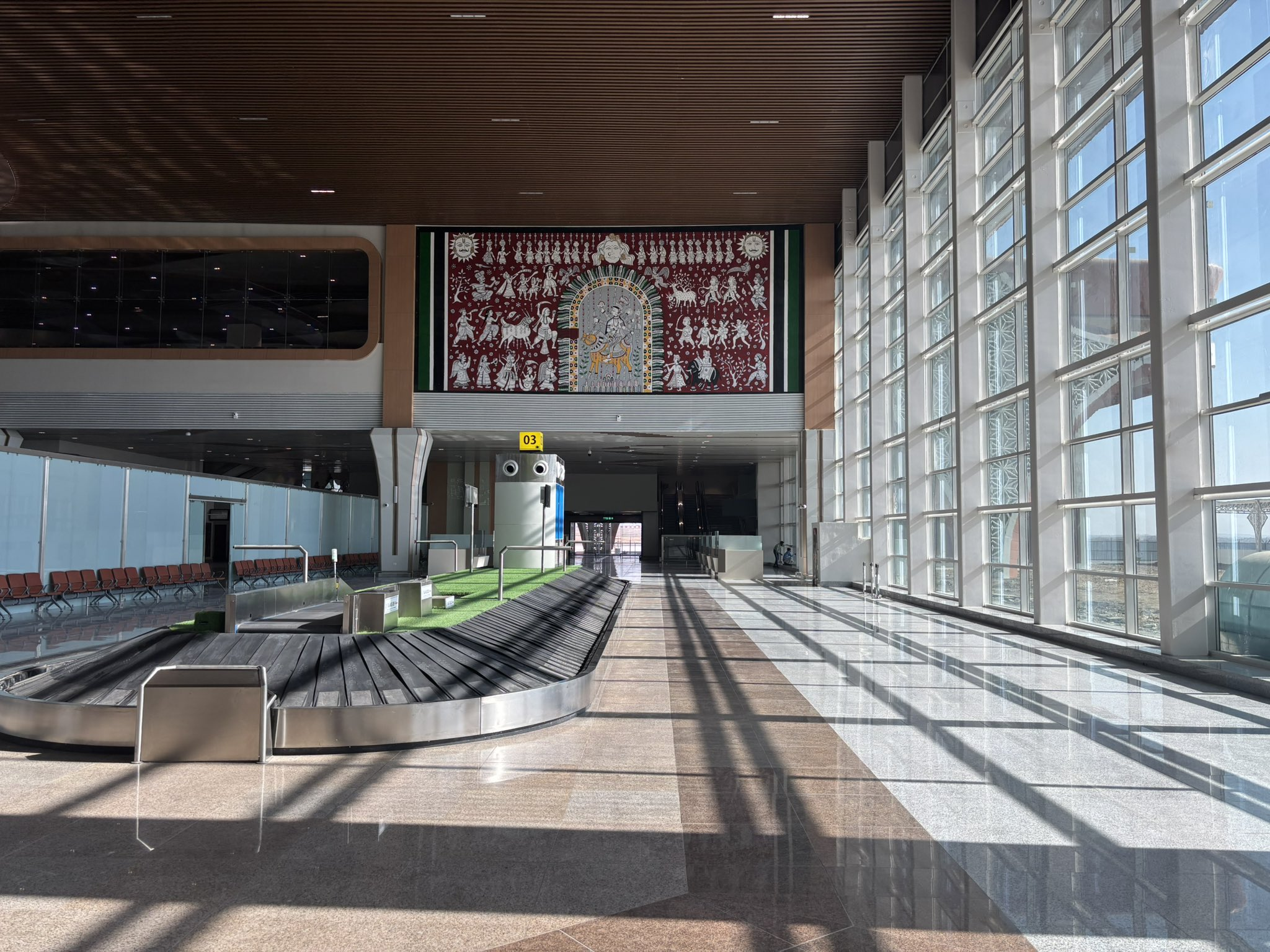
Interior view depicting art-work and cultural heritage of Saurashtra

The new terminal features modern amenities such as 256 CCTV cameras, 4 aerobridges, and parking for 14 aircraft. It is designed to accommodate up to 1,800 passengers at a time, ensuring seamless operations. Inspired by the Ranjit Vilas Palace, the design showcases the rich cultural heritage of Saurashtra. Key facilities include 3 conveyor belts, 20 check-in counters, an advanced fire alarm system, 7 boarding gates and 8 immigration counters. It has the capacity to manage 14 flights per hour and can accommodate widebody aircraft.

=== Cargo Terminal ===
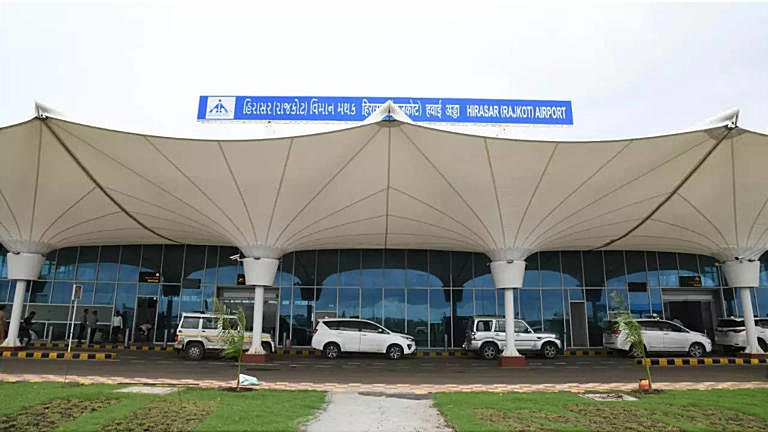
Exterior view of the erstwhile passenger terminal, currently used as a cargo terminal

The cargo terminal, which was the original and temporary terminal handling passengers after the airport was inaugurated, is now converted to handle cargo operations.

== Statistics ==
Year	Passengers	Airfreight (tonnes)	Aircraft
2023-24	5,25,668	262	4,253
2024-25	10,88,570	608.2	8,294
2025-26	12,46,996	1,121.8	8,206

== Connectivity ==
The Rajkot Central Bus Port is connected with the airport via electric buses operated by the Gujarat State Road Transport Corporation (GSRTC).

== See also ==
- List of airports in Gujarat
- Ahmedabad International Airport
- Surat International Airport
- Vadodara International Airport
