= Mundra Airport =

Airport in Mundra Taluka, India

- IATA: none; ICAO: VAMA

Summary
- Airport type: Private
- Owner/Operator: Mundra International Airport Limited (Adani Group)
- Serves: Mundra and Mundra Port
- Location: Mundra, Gujarat, India
- Elevation AMSL: 17 ft (5.2 m)
- Coordinates: 22°50′03″N 69°45′52″E

Maps
- Location within Gujarat Location within India
- Interactive map of Mundra Airport

Runways
Direction	Length		Surface
Direction	ft	m	Surface
05/23	6,300	1,920	Asphalt

Statistics (April 2025 – March 2026)
- Passengers: 4,306 (▼ -15.2%)
- Aircraft movements: 4,562 (▲18.3%)
- Cargo tonnage: —
- Sources:AAI

Mundra Airport (ICAO: VAMA) is a private airport in Mundra, Kutch, Gujarat, India owned by Mundra International Airport Limited, a subsidiary of the Adani Group. The airstrip is spread over 45 hectares and is used for scheduled as well as non-scheduled operations.

The 1,900-metre long airstrip was built as part of the Mundra Special Economic Zone for operation of executive jets in January 2007.

In October 2017, the Adani Group announced plans to develop the airstrip into a commercial international airport for passenger, cargo and Maintenance spread over 522 hectares by investing ₹ 1500 crore. The terminal building will have a capacity of 300 passengers. The runway will be capable of handling of large aircraft like the Boeing 747 and will have night landing facilities. They have received environment clearance. It will be commissioned by 2022.

Under UDAN Regional Connectivity Scheme, Air Odisha started flights between Ahmedabad and Mundra in February 2018.

On 23 June 2026, Jeet Adani, the youngest son of Gautam Adani, inaugurated the new terminal at the Airport, while Star Air (India) became the first airline to launch scheduled commercial flight services from the airport.

== Airlines and destinations ==
Airlines	Destinations
Star Air	Ahmedabad, Ghaziabad, Goa–Mopa, Mumbai, Surat
