= Rajpipla Airport =

Airport in Rajpipla, India

- IATA: none; ICAO: none

Summary
- Coordinates: 21.78°N 73.57°E

Map
- Location of the airport in Gujarat Rajpipla Airport (India)

Rajpipla Airport is a proposed airport at Rajpipla, Gujarat which would serve visitors near the Statue of Unity, located 20 kilometres (12 mi) away. The government has allocated 47 hectares (120 acres) of land, which was previously an airstrip owned by the Royal Family of Rajpipla during British Raj, to the Airports Authority of India.

Several local communities are opposed to building the airport in Rajpipla, as their land is being compulsorily acquired by the government. Despite this opposition the state government plans to build an airport at Rajpipla, in Narmada district, to provide air connectivity for tourists visiting the Statue of Unity at Kevadia Colony in the district.
