= Bhavnagar Airport =

Domestic airport in Bhavnagar, Gujarat, India

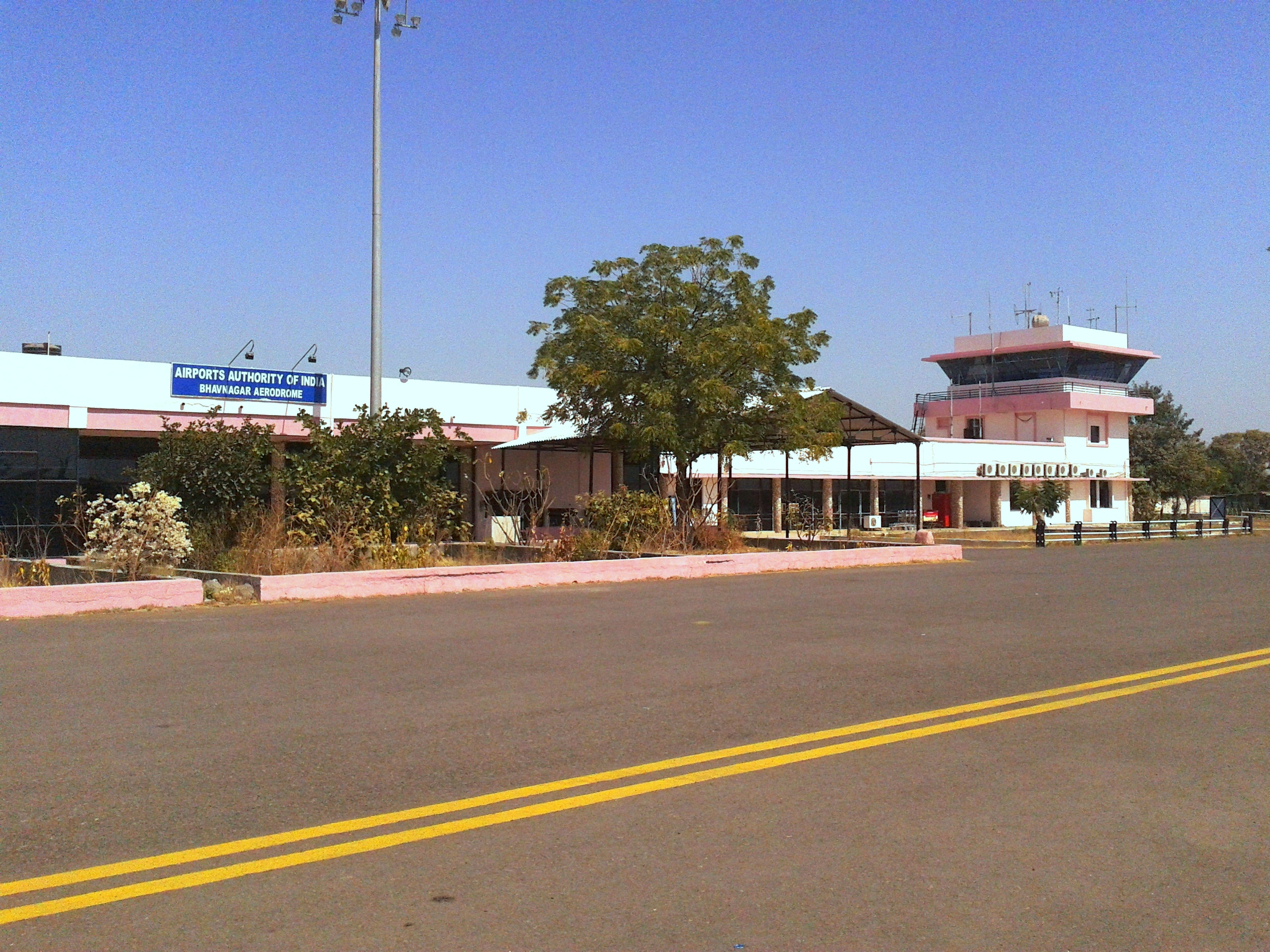
- IATA: BHU; ICAO: VABV

Summary
- Airport type: Public
- Operator: Airports Authority of India
- Serves: Bhavnagar
- Location: Shubhashnagar, Bhavnagar, Gujarat, India
- Elevation AMSL: 43 ft (13 m)
- Coordinates: 21°45′08″N 072°11′07″E
- Website: Bhavnagar Airport

Map
- Location within Gujarat Location within India

Runways
Direction	Length		Surface
Direction	m	ft	Surface
07/25	1,920	6,300	Asphalt

Statistics (April 2025 – March 2026)
- Passengers: 20,138 (▼73%)
- Aircraft movements: 1,163 (▼41.7%)
- Cargo tonnage: 0 ( 0%)
- Source: AAI

Bhavnagar Airport (IATA: BHU, ICAO: VABV) is a domestic airport serving the city of Bhavnagar, Gujarat, India. It is located at Shubhashnagar, 4 km (2 mi) south-east from the city centre and 9 km (5.6 mi) south from the Bhavnagar Port. It covers an area of 295 acres (119 ha) at an elevation of 6 metres (20 ft).

== Facilities ==
Runway

The airport's only runway is oriented 07/25, with dimensions 1,920 by 45 metres (6,299 ft × 148 ft). It is equipped with an ILS for approaches in the 25 direction.

Terminal

Bhavnagar Aerodrome has a single terminal building, which covers 1,617 square metres (17,410 sq ft) and has a capacity for 110 passengers. It contains three check-in counters and a VIP lounge.

Parking bays

The airport has two parking bays: one for Code C aircraft like the Airbus A320 and Boeing 737, and another for smaller, turboprop aircraft like the ATR 72 and Q400.

== Airlines and destinations ==
Airlines	Destinations	Refs.
IndiGo	Mumbai–Navi	
Ventura AirConnect	Surat (regional connectivity service)	

== Statistics ==
Annual aircraft movements at Bhavnagar Airport
Year	Aircraft movements	Percent change
2010–2011	1,490	
2011–2012	2,658	▲78.4%
2012–2013	2,221	▼16.4%
2013–2014	936	▼57.9%
2021–2022	914	▲65.4%
2022–2023	2,015	▲45.3%

== See also ==
- List of airports in Gujarat
