= Surat Airport =

Airport serving Surat, Gujarat, India

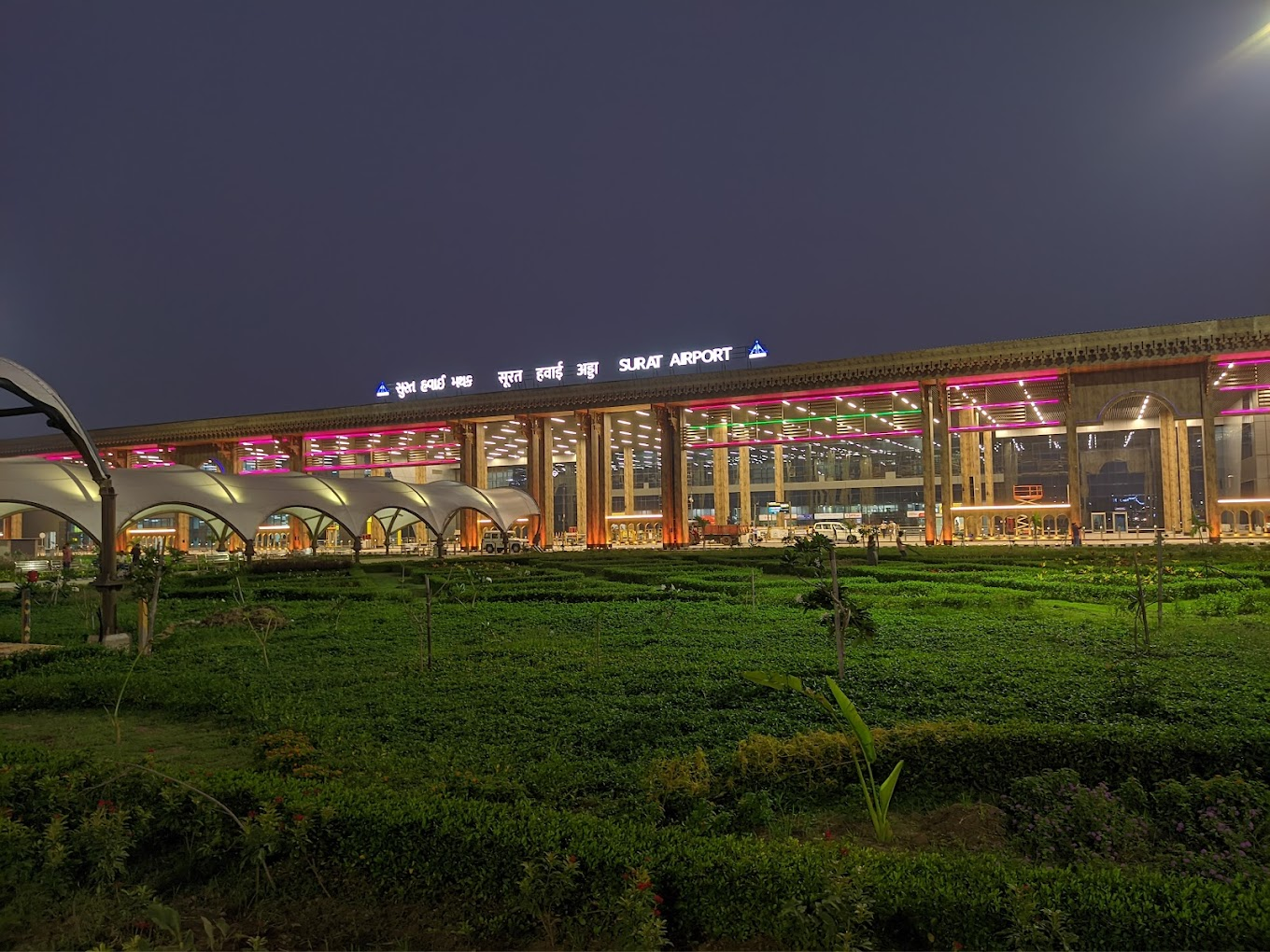
- IATA: STV; ICAO: VASU

Summary
- Airport type: Public
- Owner/Operator: Airports Authority of India
- Serves: Surat
- Location: Magdalla, Surat, Gujarat, India
- Elevation AMSL: 16 ft (4.9 m)
- Coordinates: 21°7′3.57″N 072°44′42.93″E
- Website: Surat Airport

Maps
- Location of airport in Gujarat STV (India)
- Interactive map of Surat Airport

Runways
Direction	Length		Surface
Direction	ft	m	Surface
04/22	9,530	2,905	Asphalt

Statistics (April 2025 – March 2026)
- Passengers: 18,14,572 (▲5.2%)
- Aircraft movements: 17,955 (▲8%)
- Cargo tonnage: 9,045.2 (▲31.4%)
- Source: AAI

Surat Airport (IATA: STV, ICAO: VASU) is an international airport serving Surat, Gujarat, India. It is located in Magdalla, situated 12 km (6.4 mi) from the city centre. It has a total area of 770 acres (312 ha) and is the second busiest airport in Gujarat after Ahmedabad, in terms of both aircraft movements and passenger traffic. It was awarded the status of a customs airport on 9 June 2018, and the cabinet approved the international status on 15 December 2023.

== History ==
The Government of Gujarat built the airport in the early 1970s. Safari Airways, owned by Vijaypat Singhania of the Raymond Group, operated regular services to Bombay and Bhavnagar using Douglas DC-3 aircraft in the 1970s. During the 1990s, Vayudoot and Gujarat Airways flew to Surat, but discontinued their flights in May 1994 and January 2000, respectively. The airport, with a 1,400-metre (4,600 ft) airstrip and an adjoining 60 by 40 metres (200 ft × 130 ft) apron, was then transferred to the Airports Authority of India (AAI) in 2003, who began to modernise the airport. After a failed initial attempt in July 2004 to connect Surat with Mumbai and Bhavnagar due to poor airport infrastructure, the now-defunct airline Air Deccan operated an ATR-42 aircraft daily from November 2004 to July 2005.

In 2007, the airport's 1,400-metre-long runway was extended to 2,250 metres to enable the landing of larger aircraft. Subsequently, commercial services resumed on 6 May 2007, with an Indian Airlines Airbus A319 flight to Delhi flagged off by the former Minister of Civil Aviation, Praful Patel. However, in October 2007, the runway was reportedly damaged due to poor quality of work during its extension. As a result, a limitation was imposed on the runway not to allow more than two operations of aircraft weighing over 75,000 kg up to its rated capacity of 80,000 kg, until the runway was repaired.

In 2009, the AAI announced that the airport required 864 hectares of land, and the state government had allocated such land for the development. Planned improvements at the airport included a capacity to handle up to seven jets at a time and extending the runway to 3,810 metres. The extension work on the runway was scheduled to begin in 2009. The November 2014 collision of a buffalo with a SpiceJet Boeing 737 aircraft prompted the AAI to address safety issues at the airport and extend the runway from 2,250 metres to 2,905 metres, at a cost of ₹500 million. The runway extension and repair were taken up in three phases. In the first phase, the runway was extended by 655 metres.

The adjoining concrete apron measures 235 by 90 metres, and is linked by two taxiways to its sole runway that is oriented 04/22. The runaway initially 2,250 metres long and 45 metres wide, was extended to 2,905 metres in 2017. The airfield is equipped with night landing facilities and an Instrument Landing System (ILS), as well as navigational facilities like DVOR/Distance Measuring Equipment (DME) and a Non-Directional Beacon (NDB).

== Terminal ==
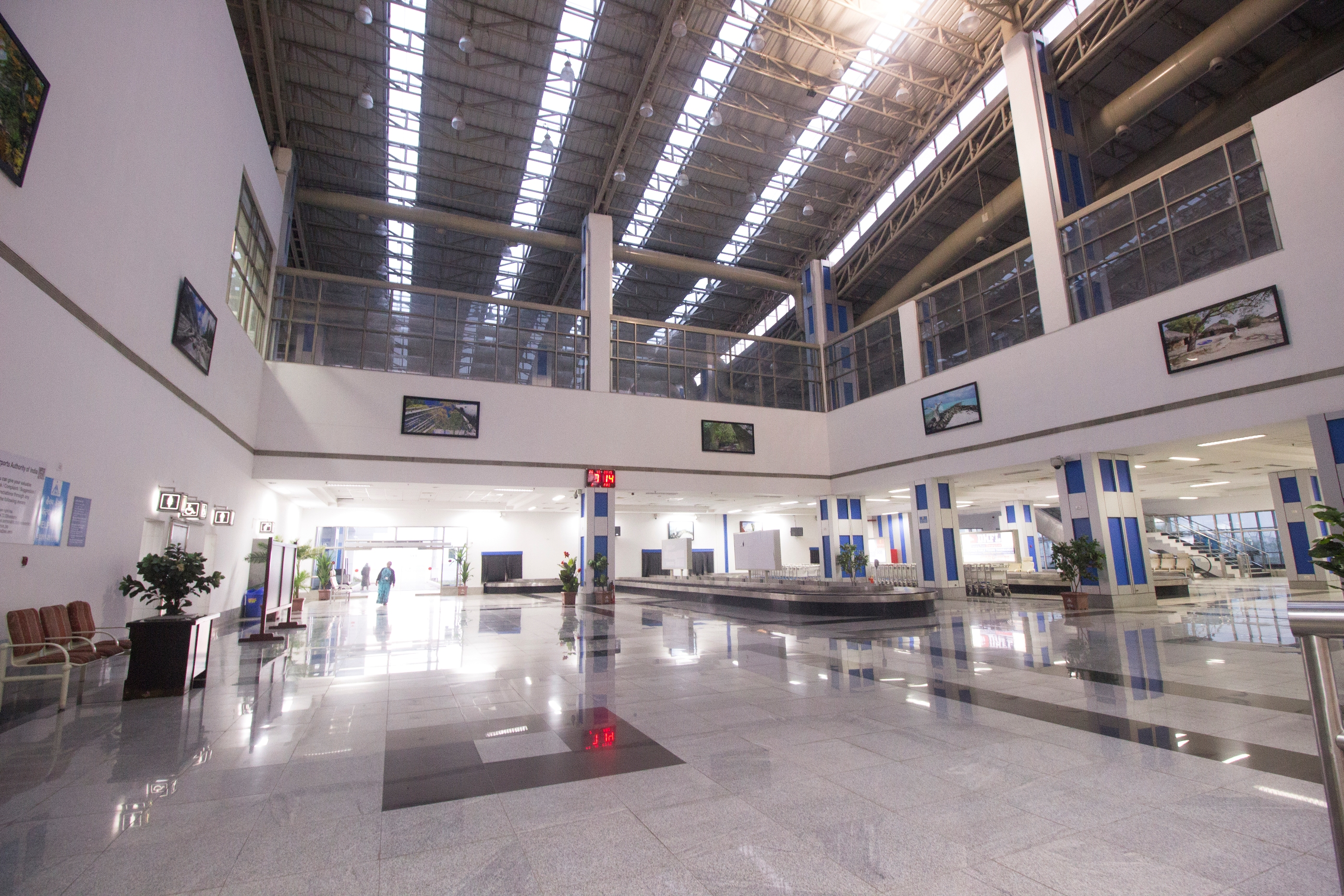
Arrivals area of the airport

=== Integrated terminal ===
The new airport terminal building was inaugurated on 27 February 2009 by the former Union Minister of State for Petroleum, Dinsha Patel. The terminal building, constructed at the cost of ₹400 million, has a total floor area of 8,500 m^{2} (91,000 sq ft) and can handle 240 passengers per hour. It is equipped with CCTV cameras, two baggage carousels in the arrivals hall, and one hand baggage X-ray machine, among other modern facilities, including two aerobridges with Visual Docking Guidance System (VDGS), two elevators, two escalators, and a 120-seat lounge. Coffee Culture and other shops have been added.

=== Expanded terminal ===
The construction work for the expansion of the terminal started in March 2020. The budget for the project is ₹ 353 crore, and Prime Minister Narendra Modi inaugurated it on 17 December 2023. It has a total area of 25,520 square metres (274,700 sq ft). It is capable of handling 1,800 passengers (1,200 domestic and 600 international) during peak hours daily, with a provision of handling a further 3,000 passengers at peak hours, and 5.5 million passengers annually, an increase from the earlier 3.5 million passengers. It is equipped with 20 check-in counters, 26 immigration counters, 5 aerobridges from the existing three, baggage conveyors, and parking spaces to accommodate 475 cars. It is designed keeping the local culture and heritage in mind, so the facade is inspired by the old Kashta houses of Rander, a coastal town in Surat district. It is also equipped with sustainability features and has been made eco-friendly with a Green Rating for Integrated Habitat Assessment (GRIHA) 4-star compliant, given for including a double-insulated roofing system, a low-heat gain double-glazing unit, canopies for energy saving, a rainwater harvesting system, sewage treatment and water treatment plants among others.

The other infrastructure developments at the airport include an extension of the apron for an additional 10 bays for code 'C' type aircraft, and a full-length parallel taxiway connecting the runway. The expansion has transformed the airport into an international airport.

=== Cargo terminal ===
The cargo terminal of the airport was inaugurated on 29 January 2020. The Airports Authority of India (AAI) approved a plan for a modular cargo terminal at the airport. After the approval of the tender, work on the construction of the new cargo terminal was awarded to a Surat-based company for the 14,000 square feet (1,300 m^{2}) cargo complex with a ground-level area of 10,800 square feet (1,000 m^{2}) and a first-floor area of 3,200 square feet (300 m^{2}), respectively. Construction of the cargo terminal was completed within the project completion period of 13 months. The AAI has future plans to build a cargo terminal at the airport and has reserved land for this purpose.

== Airlines and destinations ==
Airlines	Destinations
Air India Express	Bengaluru, Delhi, Dubai–International, Goa–Dabolim, Hyderabad, Sharjah
IndiGo	Bengaluru, Chennai, Delhi, Diu, Dubai–International, Goa–Dabolim, Hyderabad, Jaipur, Kolkata, Pune
Star Air	Jamnagar, Mundra

== See also ==
- List of airports in Gujarat
- List of the busiest airports in India
- Airports in India
