= Amreli Airport =

- IATA: none; ICAO: none

Summary
- Location: Amreli, India
- Coordinates: 21°37′19″N 071°13′37″E

Map
- Location in Gujarat

Runways
Direction	Length		Surface
Direction	ft	m	Surface
	4,877	1,487

Amreli Airport is an airstrip located in Amreli, India. It has a runway 1,260 metres (4,130 ft) long and was built by the government of Gujarat province. In December 2023, the State government of Gujarat signed a memorandum of understanding (MoU) with the Airports Authority of India (AAI) to develop 11 new greenfield airports and expand nine existing ones including Amreli.
