= List of busiest airports by passenger traffic =

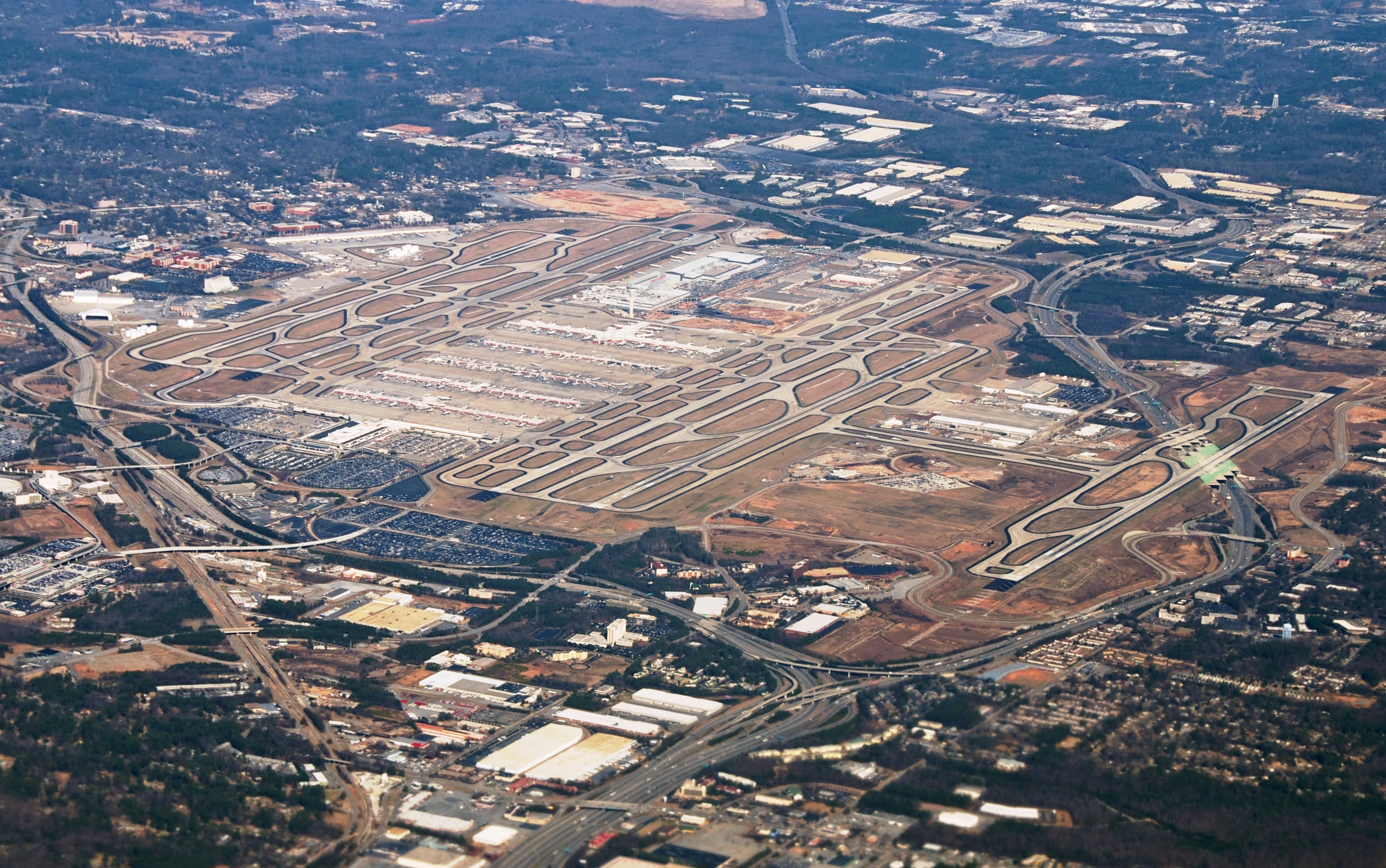
Hartsfield–Jackson Atlanta International Airport in the Atlanta metropolitan area, the world's busiest airport by passenger traffic as of 2025

The world's busiest airport is Hartsfield–Jackson Atlanta International Airport in metropolitan Atlanta, Georgia, which has been the world's busiest airport every year since 1998 with the exception of 2020, when its passenger traffic dipped for a year due to travel restrictions resulting from the COVID-19 pandemic. Atlanta regained the top position in 2021, and has held it since. Alternatively, London has the world's busiest city airport system by passenger count.

As of 2025, the United States has the most airports in the top 50 list, with 14 (15 in 2024), followed by China with 12 (same as in 2024), while India, Spain, and Turkey each have two. In terms of regions, North America has 15 airports in the top 50 (17 in 2024), along with East Asia also with 15 (14 in 2024), Europe with eight (same as in 2024), Southeast Asia with five (same as in 2024), West Asia with four (three in 2024), South Asia with two (same as 2024), and South America with one (same as 2024).

For consistency, the Airports Council International's (ACI) annual figures are always used in the final presentation and ranking, even where figures given by airport operators or authorities differ.

== 2025 statistics ==
Rank	Airport	Location	Country	Code (IATA/ICAO)	Total passengers	Rank change	% change
1.	Hartsfield–Jackson Atlanta International Airport	Atlanta, Georgia	United States	ATL/KATL	106,302,208	Steady	▼1.6%
2.	Dubai International Airport	Garhoud, Dubai, Dubai	United Arab Emirates	DXB/OMDB	95,192,160	Steady	▲3.1%
3.	Tokyo Haneda Airport	Ōta, Tokyo	Japan	HND/RJTT	91,679,814	▲1	▲6.7%
4.	Dallas Fort Worth International Airport	Dallas–Fort Worth, Texas	United States	DFW/KDFW	85,660,127	▼1	▼2.5%
5.	Shanghai Pudong International Airport	Pudong, Shanghai	China	PVG/ZSPD	84,994,548	▲5	▲10.7%
6.	O'Hare International Airport	Chicago, Illinois	United States	ORD/KORD	84,856,018	▲2	▲6.0%
7.	Heathrow Airport	Hillingdon, London	United Kingdom	LHR/EGLL	84,482,126	▼2	▲0.7%
8.	Istanbul Airport	Arnavutköy, Istanbul	Turkey	IST/LTFM	84,437,710	▼1	▲5.5%
9.	Guangzhou Baiyun International Airport	Baiyun-Huadu, Guangzhou, Guangdong	China	CAN/ZGGG	83,582,952	▲3	▲9.5%
10.	Denver International Airport	Denver, Colorado	United States	DEN/KDEN	82,427,962	▼4	▲0.1%
11.	Indira Gandhi International Airport	Palam, Delhi	India	DEL/VIDP	78,148,081	▼2	▲0.4%
12.	Seoul Incheon International Airport	Jung District, Incheon	South Korea	ICN/RKSI	74,126,912	▲1	▲4.1%
13.	Los Angeles International Airport	Los Angeles, California	United States	LAX/KLAX	73,709,594	▼2	▼3.8%
14.	Charles de Gaulle Airport	Roissy-en-France, Île-de-France	France	CDG/LFPG	72,029,407	Steady	▲2.5%
15.	Beijing Capital International Airport	Chaoyang-Shunyi, Beijing	China	PEK/ZBAA	70,742,712	▲1	▲5.0%
16.	Singapore Changi Airport	Changi, East Region	Singapore	SIN/WSSS	69,982,000	▼1	▲3.5%
17.	Amsterdam Airport Schiphol	Haarlemmermeer, North Holland	Netherlands	AMS/EHAM	68,771,592	Steady	▲2.9%
18.	Adolfo Suárez Madrid–Barajas Airport	Community of Madrid, Barajas	Spain	MAD/LEMD	68,118,754	Steady	▲3.0%
19.	Shenzhen Bao'an International Airport	Bao'an, Shenzhen, Guangdong	China	SZX/ZGSZ	66,485,213	▲3	▲8.2%
20.	Kuala Lumpur International Airport	Sepang, Selangor	Malaysia	KUL/WMKK	63,409,501	▲6	▲11.0%
21.	Frankfurt Airport	Frankfurt, Hesse	Germany	FRA/EDDF	63,189,666	Steady	▲2.6%
22.	Suvarnabhumi Airport	Bang Phli, Samut Prakan	Thailand	BKK/VTBS	62,902,183	▼2	▲1.1%
23.	John F. Kennedy International Airport	Queens, New York, New York	United States	JFK/KJFK	62,629,455	▼4	▼1.0%
24.	Hong Kong International Airport	Chek Lap Kok, New Territories, Hong Kong	Hong Kong	HKG/VHHH	60,992,000	▲8	▲14.9%
25.	Orlando International Airport	Orlando, Florida	United States	MCO/KMCO	57,675,573	Steady	▲0.8%
26.	Josep Tarradellas Barcelona–El Prat Airport	Catalonia, El Prat de Llobregat	Spain	BCN/LEBL	57,483,036	▲2	▲4.4%
27.	Chengdu Tianfu International Airport	Jianyang, Chengdu, Sichuan	China	TFU/ZUTF	56,686,738	▲2	▲3.2%
28.	Chhatrapati Shivaji Maharaj International Airport	Santacruz-Sahar, Mumbai, Maharashtra	India	BOM/VABB	55,500,000	▲2	▲1.3%
29.	Miami International Airport	Miami-Dade County, Florida	United States	MIA/KMIA	55,314,661	▼2	▼1.1%
30.	Harry Reid International Airport	Las Vegas, Nevada	United States	LAS/KLAS	55,030,375	▼6	▼5.9%
31.	Soekarno–Hatta International Airport	Tangerang, Banten	Indonesia	CGK/WIII	54,950,000	Steady	▲0.3%
32.	San Francisco International Airport	San Mateo County, California	United States	SFO/KSFO	54,532,613	▲4	▲4.3%
33.	Hamad International Airport	Doha	Qatar	DOH/OTHH	54,338,667	Steady	▲3.1%
34.	Beijing Daxing International Airport	Daxing District, Beijing	China	PKX/ZBAD	53,618,949	▲3	▲8.4%
35.	Charlotte Douglas International Airport	Charlotte, North Carolina	United States	CLT/KCLT	53,600,000	▼11	▼8.9%
36.	King Abdulaziz International Airport	Jeddah	Saudi Arabia	JED/OEJN	53,400,000	▲3	▲8.8%
37.	Seattle–Tacoma International Airport	SeaTac, Washington	United States	SEA/KSEA	52,715,181	▼3	▲0.1%
38.	Ninoy Aquino International Airport	Pasay/Parañaque, Metro Manila	Philippines	MNL/RPLL	52,020,000	▼1	▲3.8%
39.	Phoenix Sky Harbor International Airport	Phoenix, Arizona	United States	PHX/KPHX	51,618,649	▼4	▼1.4%
40.	Leonardo da Vinci Rome Fiumicino Airport	Fiumicino, Metropolitan City of Rome, Lazio	Italy	FCO/LIRF	50,872,356	Steady	▲4.1%
41.	Hangzhou Xiaoshan International Airport	Hangzhou, Zhejiang	China	HGH/ZSHC	50,459,018	▲3	▲5.0%
42.	Shanghai Hongqiao International Airport	Shanghai	China	SHA/ZSSS	50,151,025	▲3	▲4.6%
43.	Chongqing Jiangbei International Airport	Chongqing	China	CKG/ZUCK	50,094,770	▼2	▲2.8%
44.	Kunming Changshui International Airport	Kunming, Yunnan	China	KMG/ZPPP	49,705,725	▲2	▲5.4%
45.	Xi'an Xianyang International Airport	Xi'an, Shaanxi	China	XIY/ZLXY	48,535,594	▲2	▲3.2%
46.	Istanbul Sabiha Gökçen International Airport	Istanbul	Turkey	SAW/LTFJ	48,420,757	New entry	▲17.0%
47.	George Bush Intercontinental Airport	Houston, Texas	United States	IAH/KIAH	48,131,213	▼4	▼0.7%
48.	Taoyuan International Airport	Dayuan, Taoyuan	Taiwan	TPE/RCTP	47,795,969	New entry	▲6.4%
49.	Toronto Pearson International Airport	Mississauga, Ontario	Canada	YYZ/CYYZ	47,300,000	▼1	▲0.5%
50.	São Paulo/Guarulhos International Airport	Guarulhos, São Paulo	Brazil	GRU/SBGR	47,188,085	New entry	▲8.0%

== 2024 statistics ==
Rank	Airport	Location	Country	Code (IATA/ICAO)	Total passengers	Rank change	% change
1.	Hartsfield–Jackson Atlanta International Airport	Atlanta, Georgia	United States	ATL/KATL	108,067,766	Steady	▲3.3%
2.	Dubai International Airport	Garhoud, Dubai, Dubai	United Arab Emirates	DXB/OMDB	92,331,506	Steady	▲6.1%
3.	Dallas Fort Worth International Airport	Dallas–Fort Worth, Texas	United States	DFW/KDFW	87,817,864	Steady	▲7.4%
4.	Tokyo Haneda Airport	Ōta, Tokyo	Japan	HND/RJTT	85,900,167	▲1	▲9.1%
5.	Heathrow Airport	Hillingdon, London	United Kingdom	LHR/EGLL	83,884,572	▼1	▲5.9%
6.	Denver International Airport	Denver, Colorado	United States	DEN/KDEN	82,358,744	Steady	▲5.8%
7.	Istanbul Airport	Arnavutköy, Istanbul	Turkey	IST/LTFM	80,073,252	Steady	▲5.3%
8.	O'Hare International Airport	Chicago, Illinois	United States	ORD/KORD	80,043,050	▲1	▲8.3%
9.	Indira Gandhi International Airport	Palam, Delhi	India	DEL/VIDP	77,820,834	▲1	▲7.8%
10.	Shanghai Pudong International Airport	Pudong, Shanghai	China	PVG/ZSPD	76,787,039	▲11	▲41.0%
11.	Los Angeles International Airport	Los Angeles, California	United States	LAX/KLAX	76,588,028	▼3	▲2.1%
12.	Guangzhou Baiyun International Airport	Baiyun-Huadu, Guangzhou, Guangdong	China	CAN/ZGGG	76,365,092	Steady	▲20.9%
13.	Seoul Incheon International Airport	Jung District, Incheon	South Korea	ICN/RKSI	71,212,515	▲7	▲26.6%
14.	Charles de Gaulle Airport	Roissy-en-France, Île-de-France	France	CDG/LFPG	70,290,260	▼3	▲4.3%
15.	Singapore Changi Airport	Changi, East Region	Singapore	SIN/WSSS	67,650,000	▲2	▲14.8%
16.	Beijing Capital International Airport	Chaoyang-Shunyi, Beijing	China	PEK/ZBAA	67,367,428	▲7	▲27.4%
17.	Amsterdam Airport Schiphol	Haarlemmermeer, North Holland	Netherlands	AMS/EHAM	66,828,759	▼3	▲8.0%
18.	Adolfo Suárez Madrid–Barajas Airport	Community of Madrid, Barajas	Spain	MAD/LEMD	66,148,340	▼3	▲9.9%
19.	John F. Kennedy International Airport	Queens, New York, New York	United States	JFK/KJFK	63,265,984	▼6	▲1.9%
20.	Suvarnabhumi Airport	Bang Phli, Samut Prakan	Thailand	BKK/VTBS	62,234,693	▲6	▲20.4%
21.	Frankfurt Airport	Frankfurt, Hesse	Germany	FRA/EDDF	61,564,957	▼5	▲3.7%
22.	Shenzhen Bao'an International Airport	Bao'an, Shenzhen, Guangdong	China	SZX/ZGSZ	61,477,337	▲2	▲16.6%
23.	Charlotte Douglas International Airport	Charlotte, North Carolina	United States	CLT/KCLT	58,811,725	▼1	▲10.0%
24.	Harry Reid International Airport	Las Vegas, Nevada	United States	LAS/KLAS	58,447,782	▼5	▲1.4%
25.	Orlando International Airport	Orlando, Florida	United States	MCO/KMCO	57,211,628	▼7	▼0.9%
26.	Kuala Lumpur International Airport	Sepang, Selangor	Malaysia	KUL/WMKK	57,044,869	▲9	▲20.7%
27.	Miami International Airport	Miami-Dade County, Florida	United States	MIA/KMIA	55,926,566	▼2	▲6.8%
28.	Josep Tarradellas Barcelona–El Prat Airport	Catalonia, El Prat de Llobregat	Spain	BCN/LEBL	55,034,955	▲2	▲10.3%
29.	Chengdu Tianfu International Airport	Jianyang, Chengdu, Sichuan	China	TFU/ZUTF	54,905,784	▲10	▲22.6%
30.	Chhatrapati Shivaji Maharaj International Airport	Santacruz-Sahar, Mumbai, Maharashtra	India	BOM/VABB	54,821,000	▼3	▲6.3%
31.	Soekarno–Hatta International Airport	Tangerang, Banten	Indonesia	CGK/WIII	54,809,500	▲1	▲11.7.%
32.	Hong Kong International Airport	Chek Lap Kok, New Territories	Hong Kong	HKG/VHHH	53,100,000	New entry	▲34.3%
33.	Hamad International Airport	Doha	Qatar	DOH/OTHH	52,714,976	▲4	▲14.8%
34.	Seattle–Tacoma International Airport	SeaTac, Washington	United States	SEA/KSEA	52,640,716	▼6	▲3.4%
35.	Phoenix Sky Harbor International Airport	Phoenix, Arizona	United States	PHX/KPHX	52,325,266	▼2	▲17.9%
36.	San Francisco International Airport	San Mateo County, California	United States	SFO/KSFO	52,288,098	▼7	▲4.1%
37.	Ninoy Aquino International Airport	Pasay/Parañaque, Metro Manila	Philippines	MNL/RPLL	50,100,000	▲1	▲10.4%
38.	Beijing Daxing International Airport	Daxing District, Beijing	China	PKX/ZBAD	49,441,029	▲14	▲25.5%
39.	King Abdulaziz International Airport	Jeddah	Saudi Arabia	JED/OEJN	49,072,000	▲3	▲15.0%
40.	Leonardo da Vinci Rome Fiumicino Airport	Fiumicino, Metropolitan City of Rome, Lazio	Italy	FCO/LIRF	48,879,000	New entry	▲21.4%
41.	Newark Liberty International Airport	Newark, New Jersey	United States	EWR/KEWR	48,853,370	▼10	▼0.5%
42.	Chongqing Jiangbei International Airport	Chongqing	China	CKG/ZUCK	48,676,973	▼1	▲9.0%
43.	George Bush Intercontinental Airport	Houston, Texas	United States	IAH/KIAH	48,448,545	▼7	▲4.8%
44.	Hangzhou Xiaoshan International Airport	Hangzhou, Zhejiang	China	HGH/ZSHC	48,053,915	▲3	▲16.7%
45.	Shanghai Hongqiao International Airport	Shanghai	China	SHA/ZSSS	47,944,067	▼2	▲12.8%
46.	Kunming Changshui International Airport	Kunming, Yunnan	China	KMG/ZPPP	47,178,347	▼2	▲12.2%
47.	Xi'an Xianyang International Airport	Xi'an, Shaanxi	China	XIY/ZLXY	47,030,407	▼2	▲13.7%
48.	Toronto Pearson International Airport	Mississauga, Ontario	Canada	YYZ/CYYZ	46,800,000	▼8	▲4.4%
49.	El Dorado International Airport	Bogotá	Colombia	BOG/SKBO	45,802,360	New entry	▲16.0%
50.	Mexico City International Airport	Venustiano Carranza, Mexico City	Mexico	MEX/MMMX	45,359,500	▼16	▼6.2%

== 2023 statistics ==
Source: 2023 report from the Port Authority of New York and New Jersey

Rank	Airport	Location	Country	Code (IATA/ICAO)	Total passengers	Rank change	% change
1.	Hartsfield–Jackson Atlanta International Airport	Atlanta, Georgia	United States	ATL/KATL	104,653,451	Steady	▲11.7%
2.	Dubai International Airport	Garhoud, Dubai, Dubai	United Arab Emirates	DXB/OMDB	86,994,365	▲3	▲31.7%
3.	Dallas Fort Worth International Airport	Dallas–Fort Worth, Texas	United States	DFW/KDFW	81,755,538	▼1	▲11.4%
4.	Heathrow Airport	Hillingdon, London	United Kingdom	LHR/EGLL	79,183,364	▲4	▲28.5%
5.	Tokyo Haneda Airport	Ōta, Tokyo	Japan	HND/RJTT	78,719,302	▲11	▲55.1%
6.	Denver International Airport	Denver, Colorado	United States	DEN/KDEN	77,837,917	▼3	▲12.3%
7.	Istanbul Airport	Arnavutköy, Istanbul	Turkey	IST/LTFM	76,027,321	Steady	▲18.3%
8.	Los Angeles International Airport	Los Angeles, California	United States	LAX/KLAX	75,050,875	▼2	▲13.8%
9.	O'Hare International Airport	Chicago, Illinois	United States	ORD/KORD	73,894,226	▼5	▲8.1%
10.	Indira Gandhi International Airport	Palam, Delhi	India	DEL/VIDP	72,214,841	▼1	▲21.4%
11.	Charles de Gaulle Airport	Roissy-en-France, Île-de-France	France	CDG/LFPG	67,421,316	▼1	▲17.3%
12.	Guangzhou Baiyun International Airport	Baiyun-Huadu, Guangzhou, Guangdong	China	CAN/ZGGG	63,169,169	New entry	▲142.0%
13.	John F. Kennedy International Airport	Queens, New York, New York	United States	JFK/KJFK	62,464,331	▼2	▲13.0%
14.	Amsterdam Airport Schiphol	Haarlemmermeer, North Holland	Netherlands	AMS/EHAM	61,889,586	▼1	▲18.0%
15.	Adolfo Suárez Madrid–Barajas Airport	Madrid	Spain	MAD/LEMD	60,181,604	Steady	▲18.9%
16.	Frankfurt Airport	Frankfurt, Hesse	Germany	FRA/EDDF	59,355,389	▲2	▲21.3%
17.	Singapore Changi Airport	Changi, East Region	Singapore	SIN/WSSS	58,946,000	▲19	▲83.1%
18.	Orlando International Airport	Orlando, Florida	United States	MCO/KMCO	57,735,726	▼1	▲15.1%
19.	Harry Reid International Airport	Las Vegas, Nevada	United States	LAS/KLAS	57,666,456	▼7	▲9.4%
20.	Seoul Incheon International Airport	Incheon	South Korea	ICN/RKSI	56,235,412	New entry	▲213.8%
21.	Shanghai Pudong International Airport	Pudong, Shanghai	China	PVG/ZSPD	54,476,397	New entry	▲284.2%
22.	Charlotte Douglas International Airport	Charlotte, North Carolina	United States	CLT/KCLT	53,445,770	▼3	▲11.9%
23.	Beijing Capital International Airport	Chaoyang-Shunyi, Beijing	China	PEK/ZBAA	52,879,156	New entry	▲316.2%
24.	Shenzhen Bao'an International Airport	Bao'an, Shenzhen, Guangdong	China	SZX/ZGSZ	52,734,934	New entry	▲144.6%
25.	Miami International Airport	Miami-Dade County, Florida	United States	MIA/KMIA	52,340,934	▼11	▲3.3%
26.	Suvarnabhumi Airport	Bang Phli, Samut Prakan	Thailand	BKK/VTBS	51,699,104	▲24	▲79.8%
27.	Chhatrapati Shivaji Maharaj International Airport	Santacruz-Sahar, Mumbai, Maharashtra	India	BOM/VABB	51,589,040	▲1	▲34.6%
28.	Seattle–Tacoma International Airport	SeaTac, Washington	United States	SEA/KSEA	50,877,260	▼7	▲10.7%
29.	San Francisco International Airport	San Mateo County, California	United States	SFO/KSFO	50,196,094	▼5	▲18.7%
30.	Josep Tarradellas Barcelona–El Prat Airport	Barcelona	Spain	BCN/LEBL	49,883,928	▼5	▲19.9%
31.	Newark Liberty International Airport	Newark, New Jersey	United States	EWR/KEWR	49,084,774	▼8	▲12.7%
32.	Soekarno–Hatta International Airport	Tangerang, Banten	Indonesia	CGK/WIII	49,080,532	▼5	▲23.9%
33.	Phoenix Sky Harbor International Airport	Phoenix, Arizona	United States	PHX/KPHX	48,654,432	▼11	▲9.6%
34.	Mexico City International Airport	Venustiano Carranza, Mexico City	Mexico	MEX/MMMX	48,416,008	▼14	▲4.7%
35.	Kuala Lumpur International Airport	Sepang, Selangor	Malaysia	KUL/WMKK	47,242,468	New entry	▲86.0%
36.	George Bush Intercontinental Airport	Houston, Texas	United States	IAH/KIAH	46,168,662	▼10	▲12.7%
37.	Hamad International Airport	Doha	Qatar	DOH/OTHH	45,916,098	▼6	▲28.5%
38.	Ninoy Aquino International Airport	Pasay/Parañaque, Metro Manila	Philippines	MNL/RPLL	45,300,322	▲6	▲46.7%
39.	Chengdu Tianfu International Airport	Jianyang, Chengdu, Sichuan	China	TFU/ZUTF	44,786,032	New entry	▲237.4%
40.	Toronto Pearson International Airport	Mississauga, Ontario	Canada	YYZ/CYYZ	44,761,805	▼11	▲23.1%
41.	Chongqing Jiangbei International Airport	Chongqing	China	CKG/ZUCK	44,657,268	New entry	▲106.1%
42.	King Abdulaziz International Airport	Jeddah	Saudi Arabia	JED/OEJN	42,910,407	▼4	▲35.7%
43.	Shanghai Hongqiao International Airport	Shanghai	China	SHA/ZSSS	42,492,745	New entry	▲188.8%
44.	Kunming Changshui International Airport	Kunming, Yunnan	China	KMG/ZPPP	42,053,214	New entry	▲97.4%
45.	Xi'an Xianyang International Airport	Xi'an, Shaanxi	China	XIY/ZLXY	41,371,228	New entry	▲205.1%
46.	São Paulo/Guarulhos International Airport	São Paulo	Brazil	GRU/SBGR	41,307,919	New entry	▲19.8%
47.	Hangzhou Xiaoshan International Airport	Hangzhou, Zhejiang	China	HGH/ZSHC	41,170,470	New entry	▲105.5%
48.	Gatwick Airport	Crawley, West Sussex	United Kingdom	LGW/EGKK	40,905,856	▼13	▲24.5%
49.	Logan International Airport	Boston, Massachusetts	United States	BOS/KBOS	40,861,658	▼19	▲13.2%
50.	Tan Son Nhat International Airport	Tan Binh, Ho Chi Minh City	Vietnam	SGN/VVTS	40,738,295	▼16	▲18.9%

== 2022 statistics ==
Source: 2022 report from the Port Authority of New York and New Jersey

Rank	Airport	Location	Country	Code (IATA/ICAO)	Total passengers	Rank change	% change
1.	Hartsfield–Jackson Atlanta International Airport	Atlanta, Georgia	United States	ATL/KATL	93,699,630	0	▲23.8%
2.	Dallas Fort Worth International Airport	Dallas–Fort Worth, Texas	United States	DFW/KDFW	73,362,946	0	▲17.5%
3.	Denver International Airport	Denver, Colorado	United States	DEN/KDEN	69,286,461		▲17.8%
4.	O'Hare International Airport	Chicago, Illinois	United States	ORD/KORD	68,340,619	Steady	▲26.5%
5.	Dubai International Airport	Garhoud, Dubai, Dubai	United Arab Emirates	DXB/OMDB	66,069,981	▲23	▲127.0%
6.	Los Angeles International Airport	Los Angeles, California	United States	LAX/KLAX	65,924,298	▼1	▲37.3%
7.	Istanbul Airport	Arnavutköy, Istanbul	Turkey	IST/LTFM	64,289,107	▲7	▲73.8%
8.	Heathrow Airport	Hillingdon, London	United Kingdom	LHR/EGLL	61,614,508	▲46	▲217.7%
9.	Indira Gandhi International Airport	Palam, Delhi	India	DEL/VIDP	59,490,074	▲4	▲60.2%
10.	Charles de Gaulle Airport	Roissy-en-France, Île-de-France	France	CDG/LFPG	57,474,033	▲22	▲119.4%
11.	John F. Kennedy International Airport	Queens, New York, New York	United States	JFK/KJFK	55,287,693	▲15	▲79.6%
12.	Harry Reid International Airport	Las Vegas, Nevada	United States	LAS/KLAS	52,694,312	▼2	▲32.6%
13.	Amsterdam Airport Schiphol	Haarlemmermeer, North Holland	Netherlands	AMS/EHAM	52,472,188	▲22	▲105.8%
14.	Miami International Airport	Miami-Dade County, Florida	United States	MIA/KMIA	50,684,396	▼2	▲35.9%
15.	Adolfo Suárez Madrid–Barajas Airport	Madrid	Spain	MAD/LEMD	50,602,864	▲28	▲109.8%
16.	Tokyo Haneda Airport	Ōta, Tokyo	Japan	HND/RJTT	50,290,705	▲17	▲92.5%
17.	Orlando International Airport	Orlando, Florida	United States	MCO/KMCO	50,176,103	▼10	▲24.2%
18.	Frankfurt Airport	Frankfurt, Hesse	Germany	FRA/EDDF	48,918,482	▲21	▲97.2%
19.	Charlotte Douglas International Airport	Charlotte, North Carolina	United States	CLT/KCLT	47,758,605	▼13	▲10.3%
20.	Mexico City International Airport	Venustiano Carranza, Mexico City	Mexico	MEX/MMMX	46,261,729	▼3	▲28.3%
21.	Seattle–Tacoma International Airport	SeaTac, Washington	United States	SEA/KSEA	45,964,321	▼5	▲27.1%
22.	Phoenix Sky Harbor International Airport	Phoenix, Arizona	United States	PHX/KPHX	44,397,854	▼11	▲14.3%
23.	Newark Liberty International Airport	Newark, New Jersey	United States	EWR/KEWR	43,565,254	▲6	▲50.0%
24.	San Francisco International Airport	San Mateo County, California	United States	SFO/KSFO	42,210,201	▲16	▲73.5%
25.	Josep Tarradellas Barcelona–El Prat Airport	Barcelona	Spain	BCN/LEBL	41,616,302	▲33	▲120.6%
26.	George Bush Intercontinental Airport	Houston, Texas	United States	IAH/KIAH	40,974,831	▼3	▲21.7%
27.	Soekarno–Hatta International Airport	Tangerang, Banten	Indonesia	CGK/WIII	38,791,168	New entry	▲113.3%
28.	Chhatrapati Shivaji Maharaj International Airport	Santacruz-Sahar, Mumbai, Maharashtra	India	BOM/VABB	38,332,106	▲23	▲93.7%
29.	Toronto Pearson International Airport	Mississauga, Ontario	Canada	YYZ/CYYZ	36,356,109	New entry	▲186.4%
30.	Logan International Airport	East Boston, Boston, Massachusetts	United States	BOS/KBOS	36,112,473	▲14	▲59.1%
31.	Hamad International Airport	Doha	Qatar	DOH/OTHH	35,730,482	New entry	▲101.8%
32.	El Dorado International Airport	Bogotá	Colombia	BOG/SKBO	35,362,529	▲20	▲60.1%
33.	São Paulo/Guarulhos International Airport	Guarulhos	Brazil	GRU/SBGR	34,466,946	▲8	▲42.6%
34.	Tan Son Nhat International Airport	Tan Binh, Ho Chi Minh City	Vietnam	SGN/VVTS	34,278,320	New entry	▲233.2%
35.	London Gatwick Airport	Crawley, West Sussex	United Kingdom	LGW/EGKK	32,848,088	New entry	▲424.7%
36.	Singapore Changi Airport	Changi, East Region	Singapore	SIN/WSSS	32,202,000	New entry	▲954.8%
37.	Fort Lauderdale–Hollywood International Airport	Broward County, Florida	United States	FLL/KFLL	31,686,404	▼7	▲12.9%
38.	King Abdulaziz International Airport	Jeddah	Saudi Arabia	JED/OEJN	31,648,324	New entry	▲134.6%
39.	Munich Airport	Freising, Bavaria	Germany	MUC/EDDM	31,642,738	New entry	▲153.2%
40.	Antalya Airport	Antalya	Turkey	AYT/LTAI	31,228,377	▲8	▲41.7%
41.	Istanbul Sabiha Gökçen International Airport	Pendik, Istanbul	Turkey	SAW/LTFJ	30,780,357	▼4	▲23.2%
42.	Minneapolis/St Paul International Airport	St. Paul, Minnesota	United States	MSP/KMSP	30,622,784	▼3	▲25.4%
43.	Cancún International Airport	Cancún	Mexico	CUN/MMUN	30,484,094	▲3	▲36.1%
44.	Ninoy Aquino International Airport	Pasay/Parañaque, Metro Manila	Philippines	MNL/RPLL	30,329,426	New entry	▲287.8%
45.	Jeju International Airport	Jeju City	South Korea	CJU/RKPC	29,703,669	▼12	▲15.1%
46.	Rome–Fiumicino International Airport "Leonardo da Vinci"	Fiumicino, Rome metro	Italy	FCO/LIRF	29,346,365	New entry	▲151.8%
47.	Orly Airport	Orly, Paris metro	France	ORY/LFPO	29,187,269	New entry	▲85.6%
48.	Sydney Kingsford Smith Airport	Mascot, New South Wales	Australia	SYD/YSSY	29,094,483	New entry	▲265.8%
49.	LaGuardia Airport	Queens, New York, New York	United States	LGA/KLGA	28,997,592	New entry	▲85.9%
50.	Suvarnabhumi Airport	Bang Phli, Samut Prakan	Thailand	BKK/VTBS	28,754,314	New entry	▲407.6%

== 2021 statistics ==
Source: 2021 report from the Port Authority of New York and New Jersey

Rank	Airport	Location	Country	Code (IATA/ICAO)	Total passengers	Rank change	% change
1.	Hartsfield–Jackson Atlanta International Airport	Atlanta, Georgia	United States	ATL/KATL	75,704,760	▲1	▲76.4%
2.	Dallas Fort Worth International Airport	Dallas-Fort Worth, Texas	United States	DFW/KDFW	62,465,756	▲2	▲58.7%
3.	Denver International Airport	Denver, Colorado	United States	DEN/KDEN	58,828,552	▲5	▲74.4%
4.	O'Hare International Airport	Chicago, Illinois	United States	ORD/KORD	54,020,399	▲9	▲75.1%
5.	Los Angeles International Airport	Los Angeles, California	United States	LAX/KLAX	48,007,284	▲10	▲66.8%
6.	Charlotte Douglas International Airport	Charlotte, North Carolina	United States	CLT/KCLT	43,302,230	▲12	▲59.2%
7.	Orlando International Airport	Orlando, Florida	United States	MCO/KMCO	40,351,068	▲20	▲86.7%
8.	Guangzhou Baiyun International Airport	Baiyun-Huadu, Guangzhou, Guangdong	China	CAN/ZGGG	40,249,679	▼7	▼8.0%
9.	Chengdu Shuangliu International Airport	Shuangliu-Wuhou, Chengdu, Sichuan	China	CTU/ZUUU	40,117,496	▼6	▼1.5%
10.	Harry Reid International Airport	Las Vegas, Nevada	United States	LAS/KLAS	39,710,493	▲12	▲78.6%
11.	Phoenix Sky Harbor International Airport	Phoenix, Arizona	United States	PHX/KPHX	38,846,713	▲15	▲77.2%
12.	Miami International Airport	Miami-Dade County, Florida	United States	MIA/KMIA	37,302,456	▲26	▲99.9%
13.	Indira Gandhi International Airport	Delhi	India	DEL/VIDP	37,139,957	▲3	▲30.3%
14.	Istanbul Airport	Arnavutköy, Istanbul	Turkey	IST/LTFM	36,988,563	▲6	▲58.5%
15.	Shenzhen Bao'an International Airport	Bao'an, Shenzhen, Guangdong	China	SZX/ZGSZ	36,358,185	▼10	▼4.1%
16.	Seattle–Tacoma International Airport	SeaTac, Washington	United States	SEA/KSEA	36,154,015	▲16	▲80.4%
17.	Mexico City International Airport	Venustiano Carranza, Mexico City	Mexico	MEX/MMMX	36,056,614	▲8	▲64.0%
18.	Chongqing Jiangbei International Airport	Yubei, Chongqing	China	CKG/ZUCK	35,766,284	▼12	▲2.4%
19.	Shanghai Hongqiao International Airport	Changning-Minhang, Shanghai	China	SHA/ZSSS	33,207,337	▼9	▲6.6%
20.	Beijing Capital International Airport	Chaoyang-Shunyi, Beijing	China	PEK/ZBAA	32,639,013	▼13	▼5.4%
21.	Kunming Changshui International Airport	Guandu, Kunming, Yunnan	China	KMG/ZPPP	32,221,195	▼12	▼2.3%
22.	Shanghai Pudong International Airport	Pudong, Shanghai	China	PVG/ZSPD	32,206,814	▼8	▲5.7%
23.	George Bush Intercontinental Airport	Houston, Texas	United States	IAH/KIAH	31,866,308	▲16	▲75.0%
24.	Soekarno–Hatta International Airport	Tangerang, Banten	Indonesia	CGK/WIII	31,000,000	▲11	▲60.4%
25.	Sheremetyevo International Airport	Khimki, Moscow Oblast	Russia	SVO/UUEE	30,943,456	▲9	▲56.4%
26.	John F. Kennedy International Airport	Queens, New York, New York	United States	JFK/KJFK	30,788,322	▲19	▲85.1%
27.	Xi'an Xianyang International Airport	Weicheng, Xianyang, Shaanxi	China	XIY/ZLXY	30,173,312	▼16	▼2.9%
28.	Dubai International Airport	Garhoud, Dubai	United Arab Emirates	DXB/OMDB	29,110,609	▼9	▲12.7%
29.	Newark Liberty International Airport	Newark, New Jersey	United States	EWR/KEWR	29,049,552	▲25	▲82.8%
30.	Hangzhou Xiaoshan International Airport	Xiaoshan, Hangzhou, Zhejiang	China	HGH/ZSHC	28,163,820	▼13	▼0.2%
31.	Fort Lauderdale–Hollywood International Airport	Broward County, Florida	United States	FLL/KFLL	28,076,808	▲17	▲70.3%
32.	Charles de Gaulle Airport	Roissy-en-France, Île-de-France	France	CDG/LFPG	26,201,698	▼11	▲17.7%
33.	Tokyo Haneda Airport	Ōta, Tokyo	Japan	HND/RJTT	25,876,429	▼21	▼15.4%
34.	Jeju International Airport	Jeju City, Jeju Province	South Korea	CJU/RKPC	25,802,550	▼5	▲22.6%
35.	Amsterdam Airport Schiphol	Haarlemmermeer, North Holland	Netherlands	AMS/EHAM	25,500,000	▼5	▲22.1%
36.	Moscow Domodedovo Airport	Domodedovo, Moscow Oblast	Russia	DME/UUDD	25,065,087	▲16	▲52.9%
37.	Beijing Daxing International Airport	Daxing District, Beijing	China	PKX/ZBAD	25,051,012	▲16	▲55.7%
38.	Istanbul Sabiha Gökçen International Airport	Pendik, Istanbul	Turkey	SAW/LTFJ	24,991,916	▲4	▲47.2%
39.	Frankfurt Airport	Frankfurt, Hesse	Germany	FRA/EDDF	24,812,849	▼2	▲32.2%
40.	Minneapolis/St Paul International Airport	St. Paul, Minnesota	United States	MSP/KMSP	24,429,003	▲17	▲64.4%
41.	San Francisco International Airport	San Mateo County, California	United States	SFO/KSFO	24,343,627	▲9	▲48.2%
42.	São Paulo/Guarulhos International Airport	Guarulhos	Brazil	GRU/SBGR	24,164,330	▼11	▲18.7%
43.	Adolfo Suárez Madrid–Barajas Airport	Madrid	Spain	MAD/LEMD	24,121,535	▼2	▲41.1%
44.	Detroit Metropolitan Airport	Romulus, Michigan	United States	DTW/KDTW	23,610,765	▲8	▲67.4%
45.	Logan International Airport	East Boston, Massachusetts	United States	BOS/KBOS	22,695,835	New entry	▲79.6%
46.	Gimpo International Airport	Gangseo District, Seoul	South Korea	GMP/RKSS	22,525,417	▼6	▲29.1%
47.	Cancún International Airport	Cancún	Mexico	CUN/MMUN	22,393,906	New entry	▲82.1%
48.	Salt Lake City International Airport	Salt Lake City, Utah	United States	SLC/KSLC	22,383,878	New entry	▲78.2%
49.	Antalya Airport	Antalya	Turkey	AYT/LTAI	22,012,298	New entry	▲125.8%
50.	Changsha Huanghua International Airport	Changsha	China	CSX/ZGHA	19,983,064	▼14	▲4.0%

== 2020 statistics ==
Source: 2020 report from the Port Authority of New York and New Jersey

Rank	Airport	Location	Country	Code (IATA/ICAO)	Total passengers	Rank change	% change
1.	Guangzhou Baiyun International Airport	Baiyun-Huadu, Guangzhou, Guangdong	China	CAN/ZGGG	43,767,558	▲10	▼40.4%
2.	Hartsfield–Jackson Atlanta International Airport	Atlanta, Georgia	United States	ATL/KATL	42,918,685	▼1	▼61.2%
3.	Chengdu Shuangliu International Airport	Shuangliu-Wuhou, Chengdu, Sichuan	China	CTU/ZUUU	40,741,509	▲21	▼27.1%
4.	Dallas Fort Worth International Airport	Dallas-Fort Worth, Texas	United States	DFW/KDFW	39,364,990	▲6	▼47.6%
5.	Shenzhen Bao'an International Airport	Bao'an, Shenzhen, Guangdong	China	SZX/ZGSZ	37,916,054	▲21	▼28.4%
6.	Chongqing Jiangbei International Airport	Yubei, Chongqing	China	CKG/ZUCK	34,937,789	▲42	▼22.0%
7.	Beijing Capital International Airport	Chaoyang-Shunyi, Beijing	China	PEK/ZBAA	34,513,827	▼5	▼65.5%
8.	Denver International Airport	Denver, Colorado	United States	DEN/KDEN	33,741,129	▲8	▼51.1%
9.	Kunming Changshui International Airport	Guandu, Kunming, Yunnan	China	KMG/ZPPP	32,990,805	▲28	▼31.4%
10.	Shanghai Hongqiao International Airport	Changning-Minhang, Shanghai	China	SHA/ZSSS	31,165,641	▲36	▼31.7%
11.	Xi'an Xianyang International Airport	Weicheng, Xianyang, Shaanxi	China	XIY/ZLXY	31,073,924	▲29	▼34.2%
12.	Tokyo Haneda Airport	Ōta, Tokyo	Japan	HND/RJTT	31,055,210	▼7	▼63.7%
13.	O'Hare International Airport	Chicago, Illinois	United States	ORD/KORD	30,860,251	▼7	▼63.5%
14.	Shanghai Pudong International Airport	Pudong, Shanghai	China	PVG/ZSPD	30,476,531	▼6	▼60.0%
15.	Los Angeles International Airport	Los Angeles, California	United States	LAX/KLAX	28,779,527	▼12	▼67.3%
16.	Indira Gandhi International Airport	Delhi	India	DEL/VIDP	28,500,545	▲1	▼58.4%
17.	Hangzhou Xiaoshan International Airport	Xiaoshan, Hangzhou, Zhejiang	China	HGH/ZSHC	28,224,342	▲39	▼30.6%
18.	Charlotte Douglas International Airport	Charlotte, North Carolina	United States	CLT/KCLT	27,205,082	▲16	▼45.6%
19.	Dubai International Airport	Garhoud, Dubai	United Arab Emirates	DXB/OMDB	25,836,771	▼15	▼70.1%
20.	Istanbul Airport	Arnavutköy, Istanbul	Turkey	IST/LTFM	23,330,411	▲8	▼55.3%
21.	Charles de Gaulle Airport	Roissy-en-France, Île-de-France	France	CDG/LFPG	22,257,469	▼12	▼70.8%
22.	McCarran International Airport	Las Vegas, Nevada	United States	LAS/KLAS	22,255,395	▲8	▼57.0%
23.	Heathrow Airport	Hillingdon, London	United Kingdom	LHR/EGLL	22,111,469	▼16	▼72.7%
24.	Tan Son Nhat International Airport	Tan Binh, Ho Chi Minh City	Vietnam	SGN/VVTS	22,062,893	▲31	▼49.5%
25.	Mexico City International Airport	Venustiano Carranza, Mexico City	Mexico	MEX/MMMX	21,981,711	▲8	▼56.3%
26.	Phoenix Sky Harbor International Airport	Phoenix, Arizona	United States	PHX/KPHX	21,928,708	▲18	▼52.6%
27.	Orlando International Airport	Orlando, Florida	United States	MCO/KMCO	21,617,803	▲5	▼57.3%
28.	Zhengzhou Xinzheng International Airport	Xinzheng, Zhengzhou, Henan	China	CGO/ZHCC	21,406,709	New entry	▼26.5%
29.	Jeju International Airport	Jeju City, Jeju Province	South Korea	CJU/RKPC	21,054,854	New entry	▼32.8%
30.	Amsterdam Airport Schiphol	Haarlemmermeer, North Holland	Netherlands	AMS/EHAM	20,887,144	▼18	▼70.9%
31.	São Paulo/Guarulhos International Airport	Guarulhos	Brazil	GRU/SBGR	20,359,547	▲21	▼52.9%
32.	Seattle–Tacoma International Airport	SeaTac, Washington	United States	SEA/KSEA	20,061,507	▼3	▼61.3%
33.	Nanjing Lukou International Airport	Jiangning District, Nanjing, Jiangsu	China	NKG/ZSNJ	19,906,576	New entry	▼34.9%
34.	Sheremetyevo International Airport	Khimki, Moscow Oblast	Russia	SVO/UUEE	19,783,957	▲1	▼60.4%
35.	Soekarno–Hatta International Airport	Tangerang, Banten	Indonesia	CGK/WIII	19,332,468	▼10	▼64.5%
36.	Changsha Huanghua International Airport	Huanghua, Changsha, Hunan	China	CSX/ZGHA	19,223,825	New entry	▼28.6%
37.	Frankfurt Airport	Frankfurt, Hesse	Germany	FRA/EDDF	18,768,601	▼22	▼73.4%
38.	Miami International Airport	Miami-Dade County, Florida	United States	MIA/KMIA	18,663,858	▲7	▼59.4%
39.	George Bush Intercontinental Airport	Houston, Texas	United States	IAH/KIAH	18,213,913	▲8	▼59.8%
40.	Gimpo International Airport	Gangseo District, Seoul	South Korea	GMP/RKSS	17,446,239	New entry	▼31.4%
41.	Madrid Barajas Airport	Barajas, Madrid	Spain	MAD/LEMD	17,094,817	▼19	▼72.3%
42.	Istanbul Sabiha Gökçen International Airport	Pendik, Istanbul	Turkey	SAW/LTFJ	16,982,456	New entry	▼52.1%
43.	Xiamen Gaoqi International Airport	Huli District, Xiamen, Fujian	China	XMN/ZSAM	16,710,197	New entry	▼39.0%
44.	Suvarnabhumi Airport	Bang Phli, Samut Prakan	Thailand	BKK/VTBS	16,706,235	▼25	▼74.5%
45.	John F. Kennedy International Airport	Queens, New York, New York	United States	JFK/KJFK	16,630,642	▼25	▼73.4%
46.	Guiyang Longdongbao International Airport	Nanming District, Guiyang, Guizhou	China	KWE/ZUGY	16,583,878	New entry	▼24.3%
47.	Haikou Meilan International Airport	Lingshan, Haikou, Hainan	China	HAK/ZJHK	16,490,216	New entry	▼31.9%
48.	Fort Lauderdale–Hollywood International Airport	Broward County, Florida	United States	FLL/KFLL	16,484,132	New entry	▼55.1%
49.	Noi Bai International Airport	Soc Son, Hanoi	Vietnam	HAN/VVNB	16,473,214	New entry	▼43.8%
50.	San Francisco International Airport	San Mateo County, California	United States	SFO/KSFO	16,427,801	New entry	▼71.4%

== See also ==
- List of the busiest airports
- List of busiest airports by cargo traffic
- List of busiest airports by international passenger traffic
- List of busiest airports by aircraft movements
- Busiest airports by continent
- List of busiest city airport systems by passenger traffic
