= Chhatrapati Shivaji Maharaj International Airport =

Airport serving Mumbai, Maharashtra, India

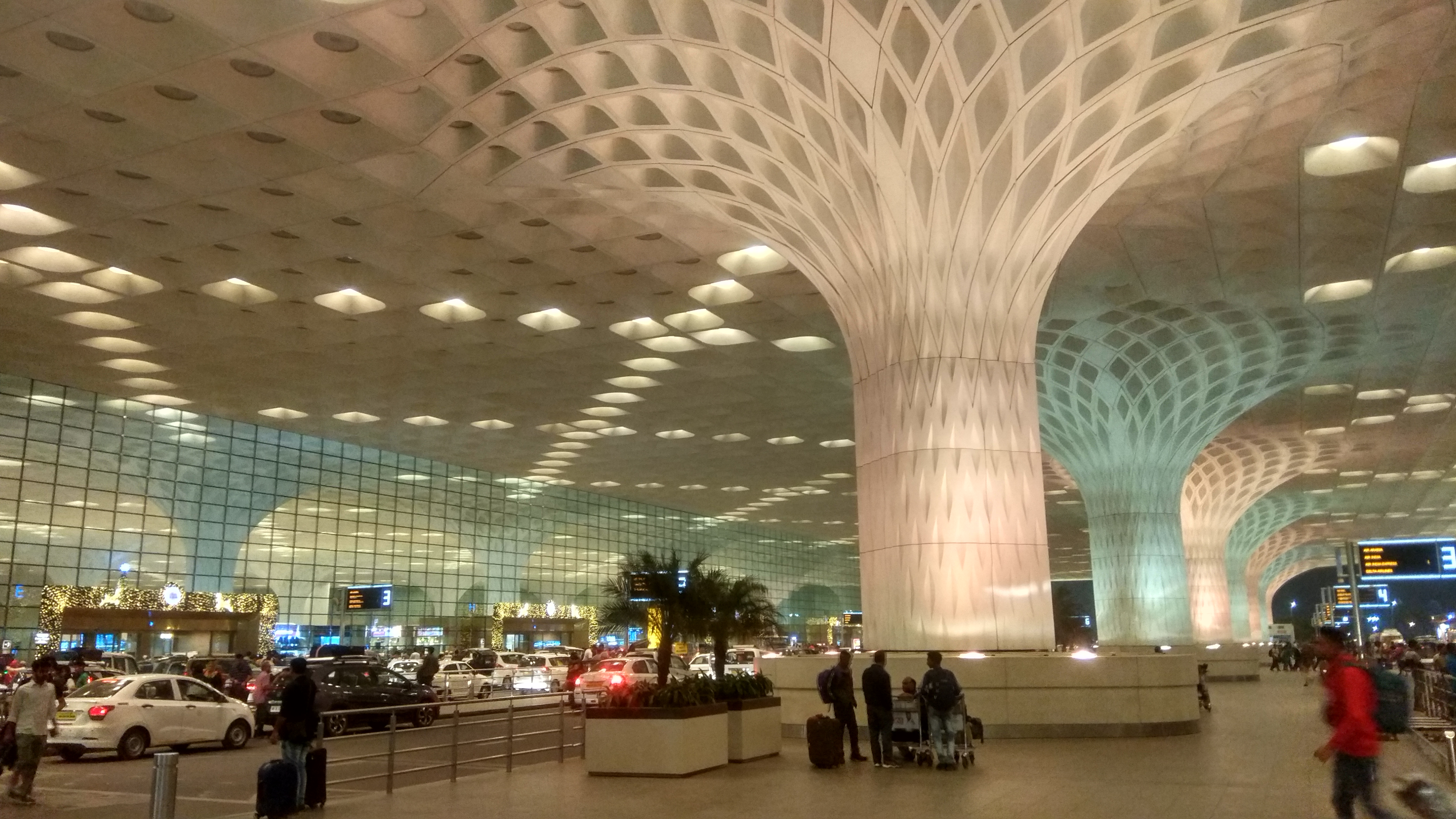
- Terminal 2 of the airport
- IATA: BOM; ICAO: VABB

Summary
- Airport type: Public
- Owner: Airports Authority of India
- Operator: Mumbai International Airport Limited (MIAL): Adani Enterprises (74%); Airports Authority of India (26%)
- Serves: Mumbai Metropolitan Region
- Location: Santacruz and Sahar, Maharashtra, India
- Opened: 1942; 84 years ago
- Hub for: Air India; Alliance Air; Blue Dart Aviation; FedEx Express
- Operating base for: Air India Express; Blue Dart Aviation; Alliance Air; Akasa Air; IndiGo
- Time zone: IST (UTC+05:30)
- Elevation AMSL: 40 ft (12 m)
- Coordinates: 19°05′19″N 72°52′05″E
- Public transit access: Line 3 CSMI Airport-T1; Line 3 CSMI Airport-T2; Line 7A (under construction) CSMI Airport-T2
- Website: csmia-mumbai.adaniairports.com

Map
- Location in India BOM/VABB (Maharashtra) BOM/VABB (India)

Runways
Direction	Length		Surface
Direction	m	ft	Surface
14/32	2,871	9,419	Asphalt
09	3,188	10,459	Asphalt
27	3,448	11,312	Asphalt

Statistics (April 2025 – March 2026)
- Passengers: 55,290,095 (▲0.3%)
- Aircraft movements: 331,756 (▲0.5%)
- Cargo tonnage: 927,499.4 (▲4.2%)
- Source: AAI

Chhatrapati Shivaji Maharaj International Airport (IATA: BOM, ICAO: VABB) is the international airport serving Mumbai, the capital of the Indian state of Maharashtra, and one of two airports serving the Mumbai Metropolitan Region, the other being the Navi Mumbai International Airport. It is the second-busiest airport in India in terms of total and international passenger traffic after Delhi, the 14th-busiest airport in Asia, and the 28th-busiest airport in the world by passenger traffic in 2025.

The airport is operated by Mumbai International Airport Limited (MIAL), a joint venture between Adani Enterprises, a subsidiary of the Adani Group, and Airports Authority of India,

The airport is named after Shivaji (1630–1680), the 17th-century Chhatrapati of the Maratha Empire. It was renamed in 1999 from the previous "Sahar Airport" to "Chhatrapati Shivaji International Airport" (the title "Maharaj" was inserted on 30 August 2018). It is situated across the suburbs of Santacruz and Sahar Village in Vile Parle East.

== History ==
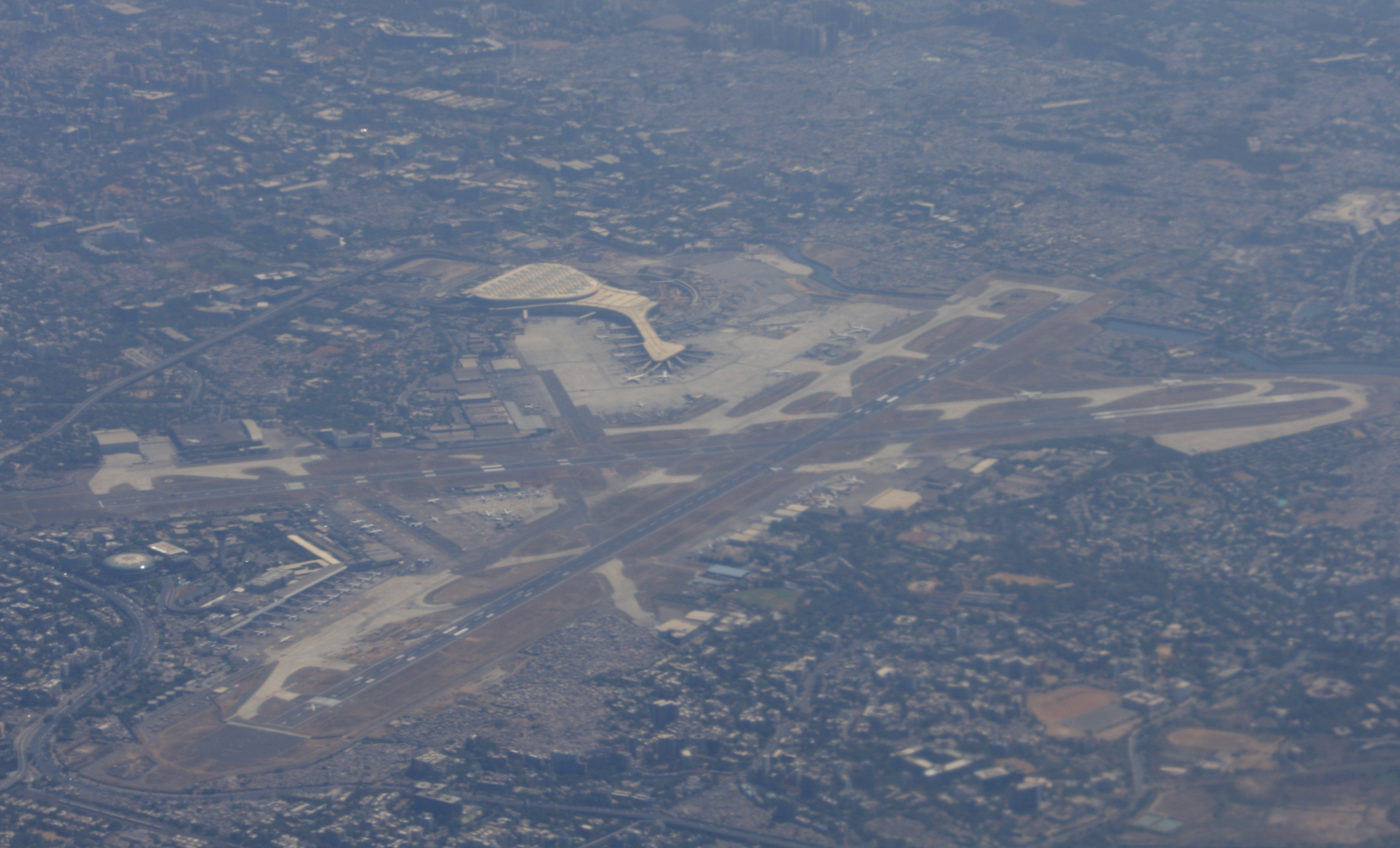
Aerial view of the airport

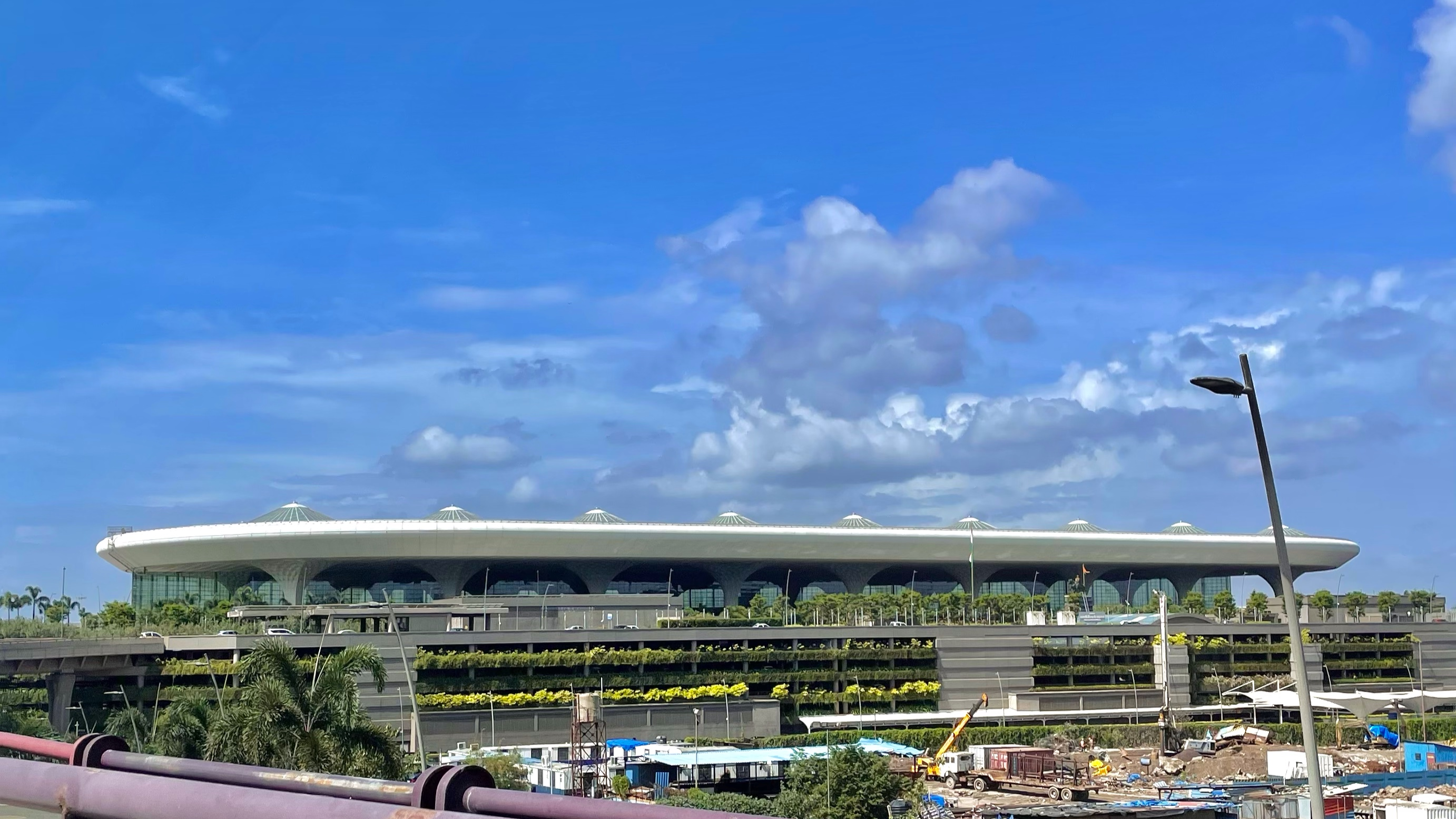
Landside view of Terminal 2

RAF Santa Cruz was constructed in the 1930s. It was a bigger airfield than the nearby Juhu Aerodrome and was home to several RAF squadrons during World War II from 1942 to 1947. The Airport covered an area of about 1,500 acres (610 ha) and initially had three runways. The apron existed on the south side of runway 09/27, and the area, referred to today as the "Old Airport", houses, among others, maintenance hangars of Air India, Air Works India, Indamer Aviation Pvt Ltd, and MIAL's General Aviation Terminal.

By 1946, when the RAF began the process of handing over the airfield to the Director General of Civil Aviation for Civil operations, two old abandoned hangars of the Royal Air Force had been converted into a terminal for passenger traffic. One hangar was used as a domestic terminal and the other for international traffic. It had counters for customs and immigration checks on either side and a lounge in the centre. Air India handled its passengers in its own terminal adjoining the two hangars. In its first year, it handled six civilian services a day.

Traffic at the airport increased after Karachi was partitioned to Pakistan and as many as 40 daily domestic and foreign services were operated by 1949, prompting the Indian Government to develop the airport, equipping the airport with a night landing system comprising a Radio range and a modernised flare path lighting system. Construction of a new passenger terminal and apron began in 1950 and was commissioned in 1958. Named after the neighbourhood in which it stood and initially under the aegis of the Public Works Department, the new airport was subsequently run by the Ministry of Civil Aviation.

With the dawning of the jumbo jet era in the 1970s, Santacruz, despite several extensions, began suffering from insufficient operational capacity. The Santacruz terminal was designed to accommodate 600 passengers at any given time, but by the late 1970s, it was handling 1,200. In 1979–80, 5 million domestic and international passengers flew into and out of Santa Cruz compared with 3 million at Delhi's Palam Airport. The airlines were constantly expanding their services, but there was no corresponding increase in space at the terminal, making it the most congested airport in the country. In one of its issues, Time magazine, referring to the chaos, called the terminal building a "black hole". A major fire gutted the International section of the terminal building on 21 September 1979, killing three passengers and shutting down the airport. A temporary departure extension or "Gulf Terminal" was made functional in October of that year until the terminal was repaired.

The Tata committee, set up in 1967 to examine the issues concerning the airport, had recommended the construction of a new international terminal to meet the requirements of traffic in the seventies. The Santa Cruz terminal was to be used for domestic traffic alone. The International Airport Authority of India (IAAI), which was set up in 1972, started planning the construction of a new terminal building for handling international passenger traffic, to be completed by 1981. Accordingly, construction of the new international terminal at Sahar to the northeast of Santacruz in Vile Parle was taken up at an estimated cost of ₹ 110 million. Construction of the new international terminal at Sahar began in November 1977, and the first phase took three years to build. Sahar Terminal 2A, the first phase of the two-part terminal, was opened on 5 December 1980.

AAI had been considering the modernisation of Bombay Airport in 1996, although the AAI board approved a modernisation proposal only in 2003. By then, Bombay and Delhi Airports were handling almost 38% of the country's aircraft movements and generating one-third of all revenues earned by AAI. At that time, the Bombay airport handled 13.3 million passengers, 60% of whom were domestic travellers. The airport faced severe congestion for both aircraft and passengers as it was handling twice as many aircraft movements per day as it was originally designed for. The bidding process for its modernisation eventually began in May 2004, with the decision by the Empowered Group of Ministers (EGoM) was announced in January 2006. In November 2006, Delta Air Lines inaugurated a direct flight from Mumbai to New York.

In January 2009, the International Terminal 2A was demolished to make way for the new terminal. The new Terminal was inaugurated 5 years later in January 2014, although it was open to passenger operations the following month. Terminals 2B and 2C were subsequently demolished by the end of 2014. Terminal 2 subsequently started domestic operations in 2015, with Vistara launching flights to Delhi. A new Air Traffic Control tower was also inaugurated, which replaced the old tower until 2014.

During the lockdown in COVID-19 pandemic starting March 2020, commercial operations were suspended, although rescue flights to bring back expat Indians were in effect, operated by Air India and Air India Express. Passengers arriving had to undergo mandatory testing and quarantine period.

The Adani Group took over the operations in February 2021 from GVK. The group holds a 74% stake, while the rest is controlled by Airports Authority of India.

In 2025, MIAL proposed to increase CSMIA's capacity from 55 MPA to 65 MPA. The existing Terminal 1 building, with a capacity of 15 MPA was proposed to be re-constructed to handle 20 MPA at a cost of about Rs 2,500 crore. The project was initially estimated to be completed in three years with demolition activity planned to begin in November 2025 and construction planned to be completed by September 2028. However the demolition has now been pushed back to 2030. and expected to be completed by 2033–34. T2 would be expanded to handle 45 MPA from the current 40 MPA. MIAL proposed construction of about 13,080 square metres of additional floor space at a cost of Rs 107.3 crore. The Northwest pier is proposed to be extended in order to accommodate a dedicated crew terminal at T2. This will free up space for passengers at T2, since nearly 2000 air crew who board flights daily have to use the common passenger areas. The dedicated crew terminal will cover about 3,000 square metres and is expected to cost Rs 43 crore. The extended pier will also have extra bus and contact gates. MIAL expects the crew terminal to be ready by 2026 The existing general aviation (GA) terminal is also to be expanded at a cost of Rs 225 crore, from current floor area of 890 square metres to 10,783 square metres.

== Passenger traffic and operational records ==
Its passenger traffic was about 49.8 million in year 2018. It is also the second-busiest airport in terms of cargo traffic. In March 2017, the airport surpassed London's Gatwick Airport as the world's busiest to operate a single runway at a time. This was later surpassed again by Gatwick Airport at the end of 2019 due to passenger numbers falling at Mumbai.

It handled a record of 1,007 aircraft movements on 9 December 2018, higher than its earlier record of 1,003 flight movements in a day in June 2018. It handled a record of 51 movements in one hour on 16 September 2014. In financial year 2020, the airport handled 45.87 million passengers, only second to IGI's 67.3 million in India. In financial year 2024–25, the airport handled the highest ever passengers in its history of over 55.1 million passengers, surpassing its maximum capacity of 50 million passengers per year, and second only to IGI's 79.2 million in India.

== Management and modernisation ==
A consortium of GVK Industries, Airports Company South Africa, and Bidvest, won the bid to run the Mumbai Airport. To accomplish this task, Mumbai International Airport Private Limited (MIAL), a joint venture between the consortium (74%) and the Airports Authority of India (26%) was formed. Since then, MIAL has made several improvements in the aesthetics, design and passenger conveniences at CSMIA including the refurbishment of domestic terminals 1A & 1B, international terminals 2B & 2C, and the opening of a brand new domestic terminal 1C and new Terminal T2. MIAL also undertook airside improvement projects such as the commissioning of new taxiways, and aprons and the reconstruction of the two runways. In February 2008, MIAL entered into an agreement with Air Transport IT specialist SITA that led to CSIA becoming the first airport in India to Implement Common-use self-service Kiosks and CUTE (Common Use Terminal Equipment) check-in systems.

In February 2021, the Adani Group, through its subsidiary, Adani Enterprises acquired both GVK and Bidvest's stakes in MIAL, giving it a controlling interest of 74% in the venture.

== Structure ==
=== Runways ===
The airport has two intersecting runways and handles an average of 980 flights per day. The runways were upgraded to Code F, which means they can accommodate larger aircraft like the Airbus A380. Following a presentation in March 2011 by UK's air traffic service provider NATS on how the capacity of the airport can be increased, MIAL set a target of 48 aircraft movements an hour in an effort to reduce congestion at the airport. Both runways were operated simultaneously especially during peak hours to try and attain this target. MIAL scrapped simultaneous Cross-runway flight operations in mid-2013 after it found that single runway operations were more effective for increasing aircraft movements per hour. Runway 14/32 was henceforth to be used only when the main runway was unavailable due to maintenance or other reasons. The construction of new rapid exit taxiways helped in increasing flight handling capacity from 32 movements per hour to 44 in 2012. NATS delivered and helped MIAL implement a 'change roadmap' to help CSMIA achieve more than 50 movements per hour in 2015. The increased air-side efficiencies resulted in CSMIA overtaking Gatwick Airport in March 2017 to become the world's busiest airport with only one operational runway at a time.

Number	Length	Width	ILS	Notes
09–27	3,445 m (11,302 ft)	60 metres (200 ft)	Cat. II (27); Cat. I (09)	
14–32	2,871 m (9,419 ft)	45 metres (148 ft)	Cat. I (both directions)	

Runway notes

Once the longest commercial runway in India, Runway 09/27 is the airport's main runway. 13 taxiways, including four rapid exit taxiways, connect it to a full-length parallel taxiway to its north. It intersects the secondary runway south of the terminal buildings. The reconstruction of the runway started in September 2010 and was completed in May 2011. The runway width was increased from 45 metres (148 ft) to 60 metres (200 ft) with a runway shoulder width of 7.5 m added on each side. The ILS on 27 starts at 2,900 ft (880 m) and is 9.1 nautical miles (16.9 km) long with a glide slope path of 3°.

Runway 14/32 has ten taxiways including three rapid exit taxiways that connect to a parallel taxiway running along its eastern flank. It runs between Terminals 1 and 2 and was reconstructed in 2010. The runway shoulders were widened from 7.5 to 15 metres (25 to 49 ft). The associated taxiways of the secondary runway were upgraded in 2019. A new rapid exit taxiway and the conversion of taxiways to Code-F effectively increased the capacity of the runway. In 2020, the secondary runway set a record of 47 movements per hour during peak hour traffic as compared to 36 movements per hour.

Issues with utilising 14/32 are:

- Trombay Hill, lies 4.5 nmi (8.3 km) away from the 32 end, an approach that was temporarily made a No-Fly zone because the Bhabha Atomic Research Centre (BARC) nuclear complex at Trombay (Anushakti Nagar) lies within its flight path.
- At 2,871 meters (9,420 feet), runway 14/32 is quite shorter than 09/27, and is not effective in critical situations such as emergency landings or during wet conditions, which has led to aircraft skidding on landing. The shorter length of the runway affects widebody planes in such scenarios.

MIAL was considering constructing a second parallel runway as part of its master plan. However, the construction of this runway would necessitate a large-scale relocation of either Air India's hangars and maintenance facilities or the airport's flight kitchens and the Sahar police station, among others, depending on its alignment. The parallel runway remains an active part of the expansion plan but in the meantime the cross runway is being upgraded as much as possible.

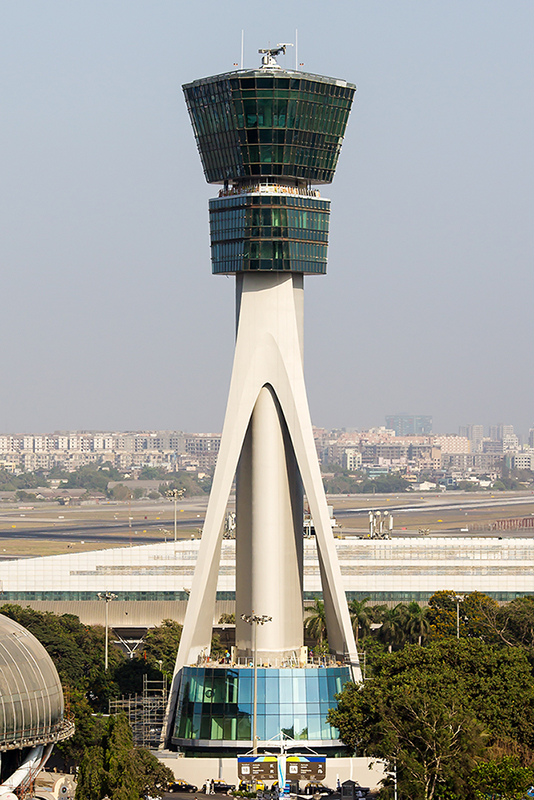
The ATC tower as seen from the Western Express Highway

=== Air traffic control tower ===
India's second tallest air traffic control tower with a height of 87.5 m (287 ft) after Delhi Airport (101.9 m (334 ft)) stands in a section of the parking area opposite terminal 1B. The triangular three-dimensional structure with soft vertices that won the Hong Kong Building Information Modelling (BIM) Award for the year 2009, has six storeys commencing from 62.1 m (204 ft). The tower was inaugurated on 18 October 2013 and took over operations on 1 January 2014.

From the new tower, air traffic controllers are able to see 8 km (5 miles) beyond the thresholds of both runways. The tower and its associated technical block and mechanical plant building cover a total of 2,884 m^{2} (31,040 sq ft). The cost of the fully equipped tower is estimated at ₹4 billion.

The previous ATC tower, built by the Airports Authority of India (AAI) at an overall project cost of about ₹2.80 billion, was functional from 1999 to 2013. During that period, many airlines such as Singapore Airlines, Saudia, Qantas and United avoided landing at Mumbai airport when the secondary runway was in use as the ATC tower was too close to the runway and not in compliance with ICAO standards. The tower penetrated runway 14/32's transitional obstacle limitation surfaces by over 50 metres (for ILS approaches). The tower also obstructed the path of a parallel taxiway under construction for the secondary runway. MIAL demolished the tower in 2014.

== Terminals ==
The airport has two terminals for scheduled commercial passenger services: Terminal 1 at Santacruz for domestic flights and Terminal 2 at Sahar for both international and domestic flights. While both terminals use the same airside facilities, they are physically separated on the city side, requiring a 15–20-minute (landside) drive between them. A dedicated General Aviation Terminal caters to passengers using private and non-scheduled flight operations.

=== Operational terminals ===
==== Terminal 1, Santacruz Airport ====
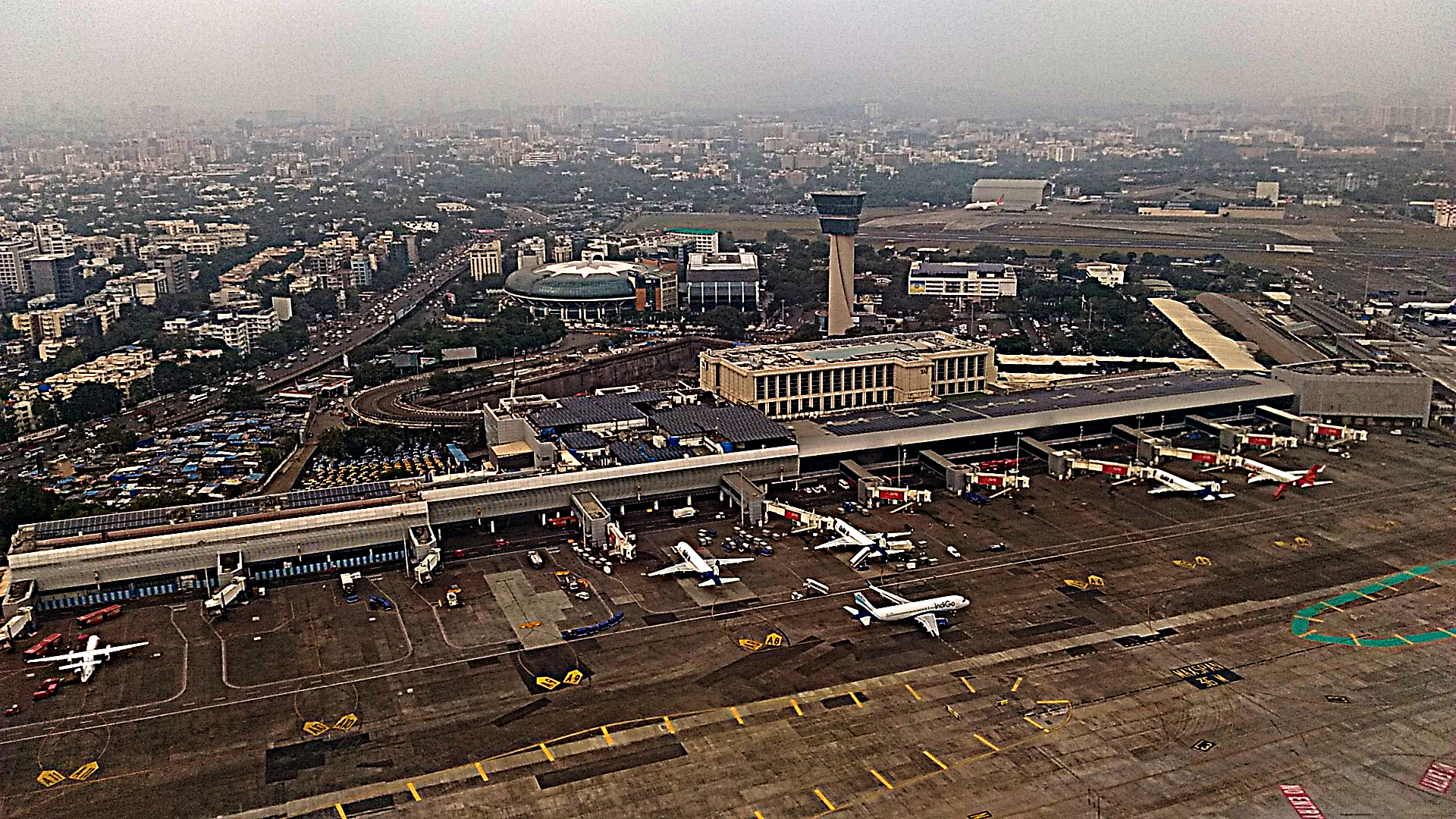
Terminal 1 as seen during takeoff

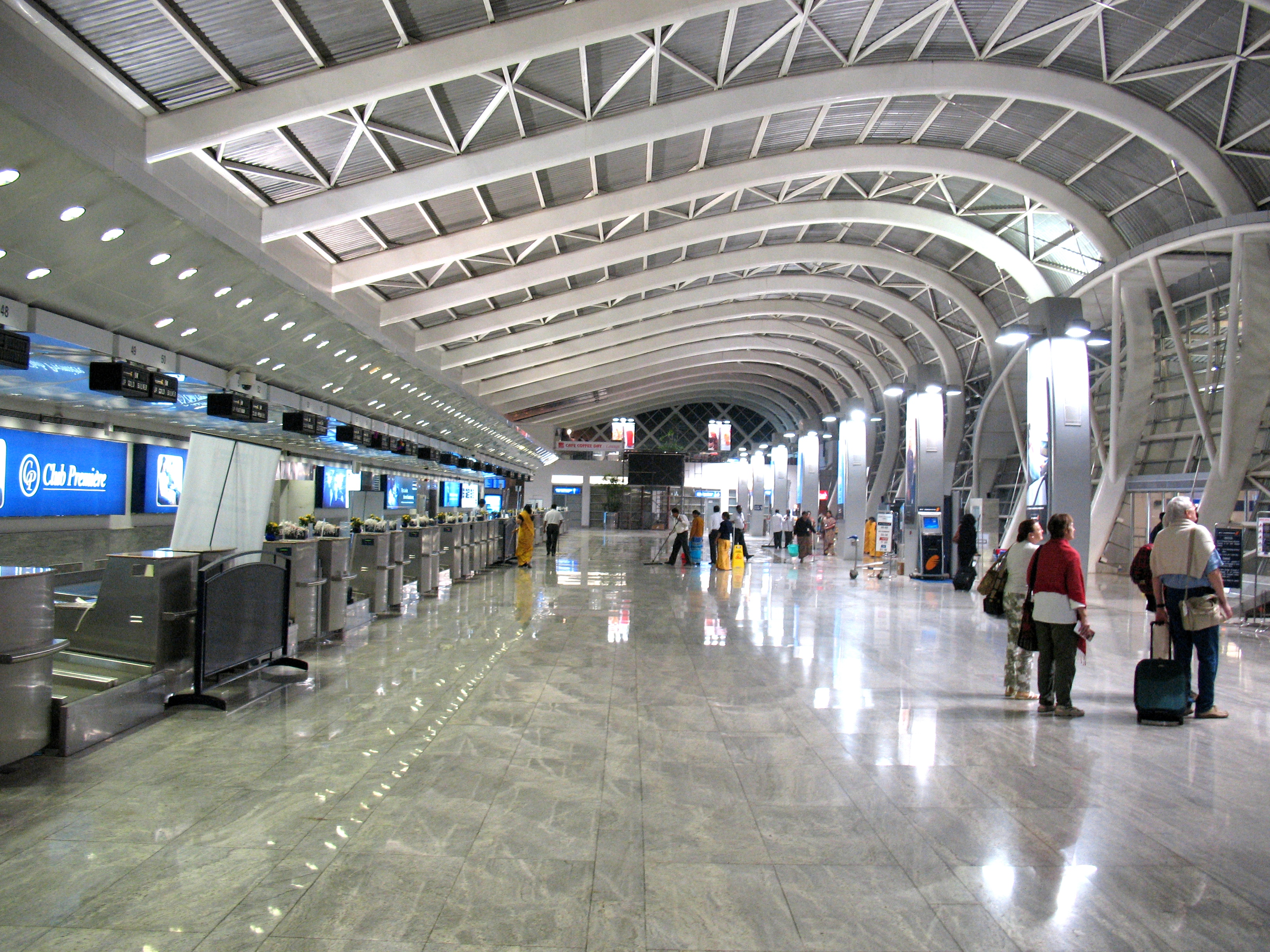
Check-in area of Terminal 1

Terminal 1 is only used for domestic flights operated by low-cost carriers. This was the original Santacruz building that was Mumbai's first passenger terminal which was once integrated, however was renamed Terminal 1 after the opening of the Sahar International Airport, Terminal 2 for international flights and became a domestic terminal. It was refurbished several times over the decades, the most recent being during the 2000s. It was further divided into Terminal 1A, Terminal 1B, and Terminal 1C after their permanent closure during the course of the late 1990s and early 2000s. Terminal 1 was used by SpiceJet, Go First, and IndiGo, but after Jet Airways dissolved on 17 April 2019, most of the flights operated from Terminal 1 were shifted to Terminal 2. The terminal has 11 passenger boarding bridges. MIAL renamed Terminal 1B and Terminal 1C to Terminal 1 in January 2017 to help fliers identify it easily. At present Terminal 1 operates only domestic flights operated by Akasa Air, Alliance Air, Indigo (Some Flights), Spicejet, and Star Air.

Citing safety and structural challenges, in March 2024, the Adani Group announced plans to demolish and re-build Terminal 1, a few months after the airport in Navi Mumbai starts operations. Originally, the rebuilding project and research plan was to begin demolition in November 2025 and the newer, bigger terminal was expected to be operational by 2028. However in August 2025, Adani said that the terminal’s closure would be delayed and instead be coordinated with the commencement of full operations at NMIA’s second terminal. Terminal 1 will remain operational until 2030.

The New Terminal 1 will be connected to upgraded Terminal 2 through a three-lane underground tunnel to facilitate airside passenger movement between terminals. The tunnel will cost Rs 500 - 600 Crores and will be completed in 2 phases.

==== Terminal 2, Sahar International Airport ====
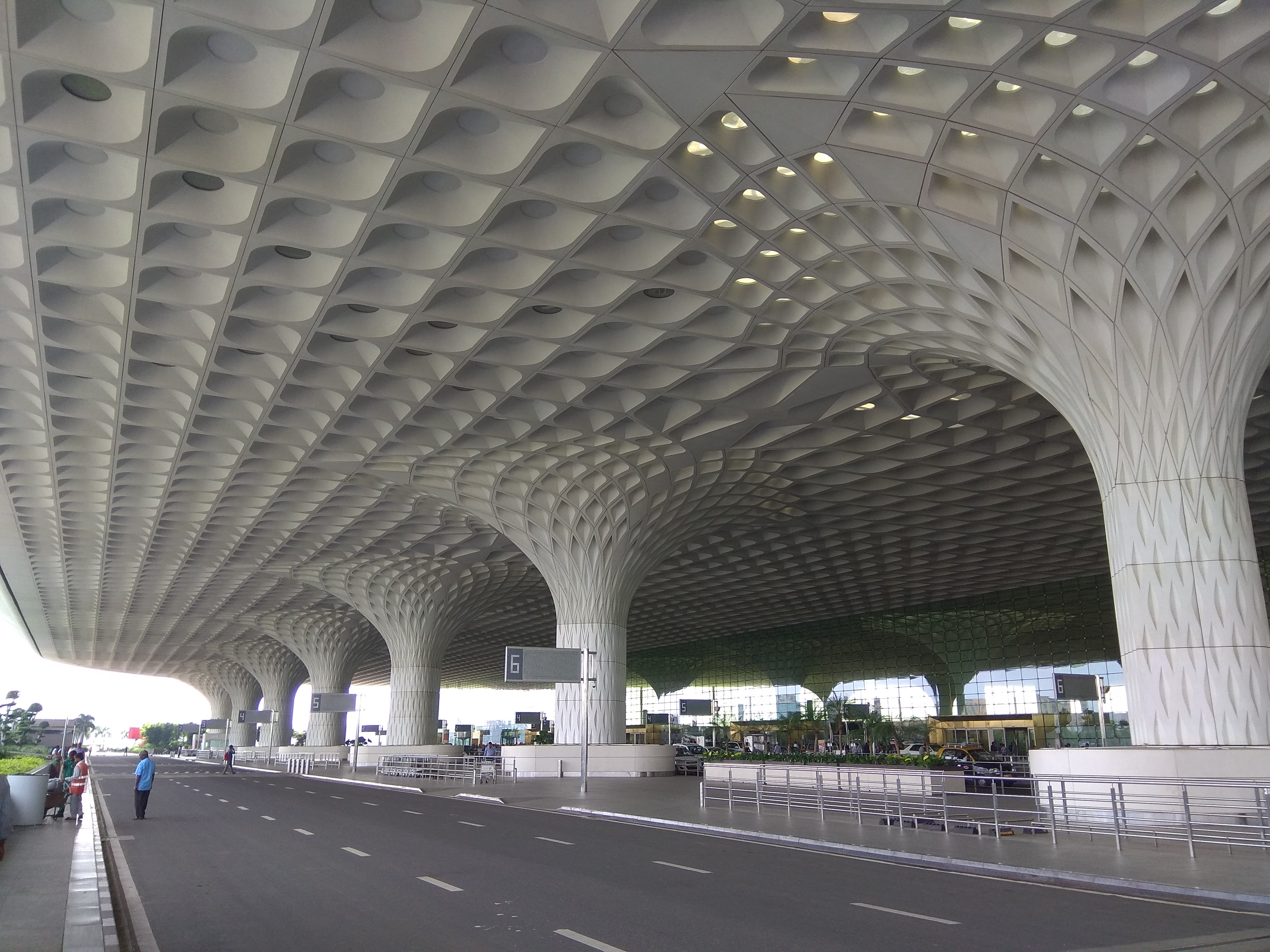
Entrance of Terminal 2

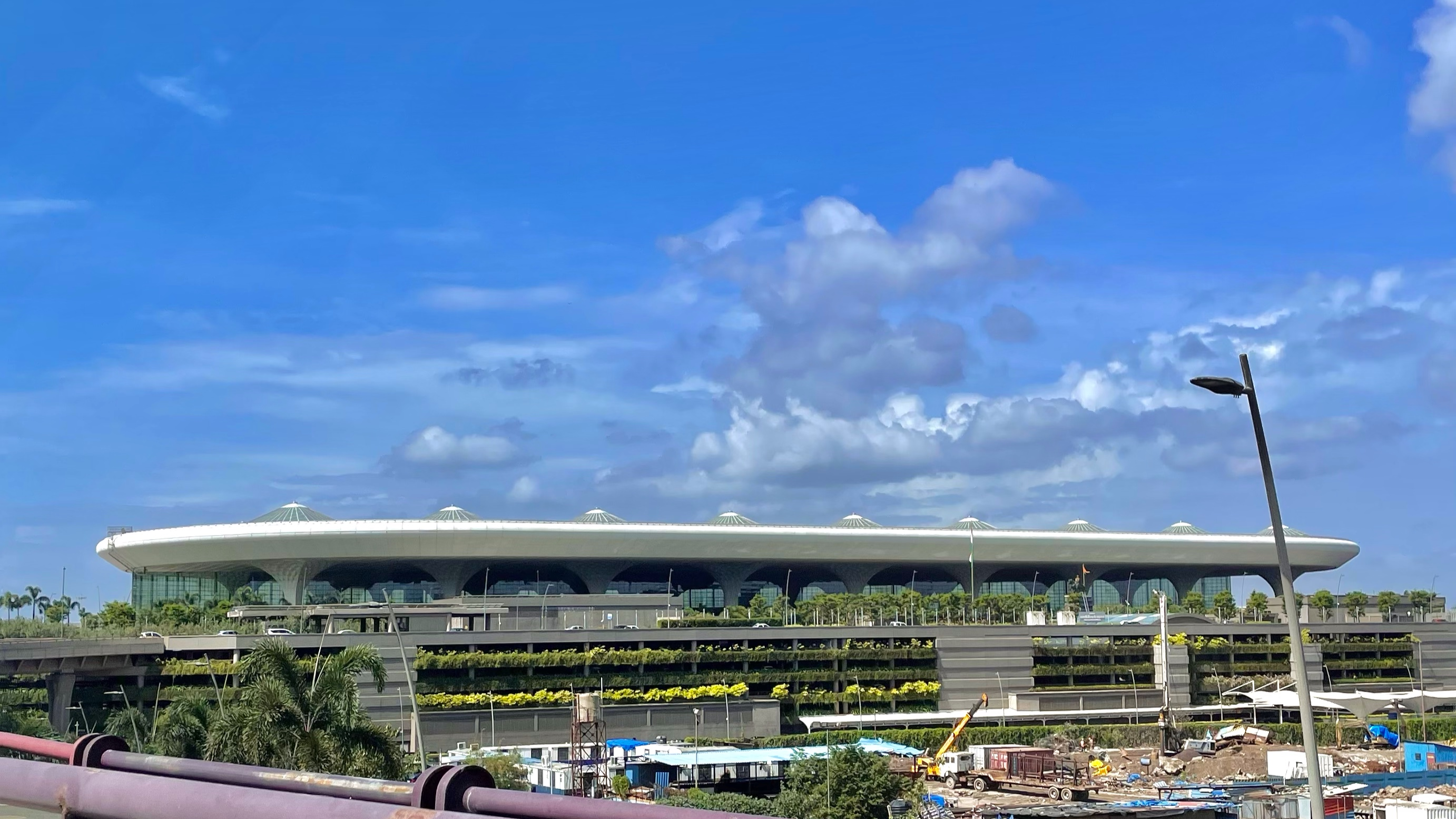
Terminal 2 as seen from Sahar Elevated Road (landside)

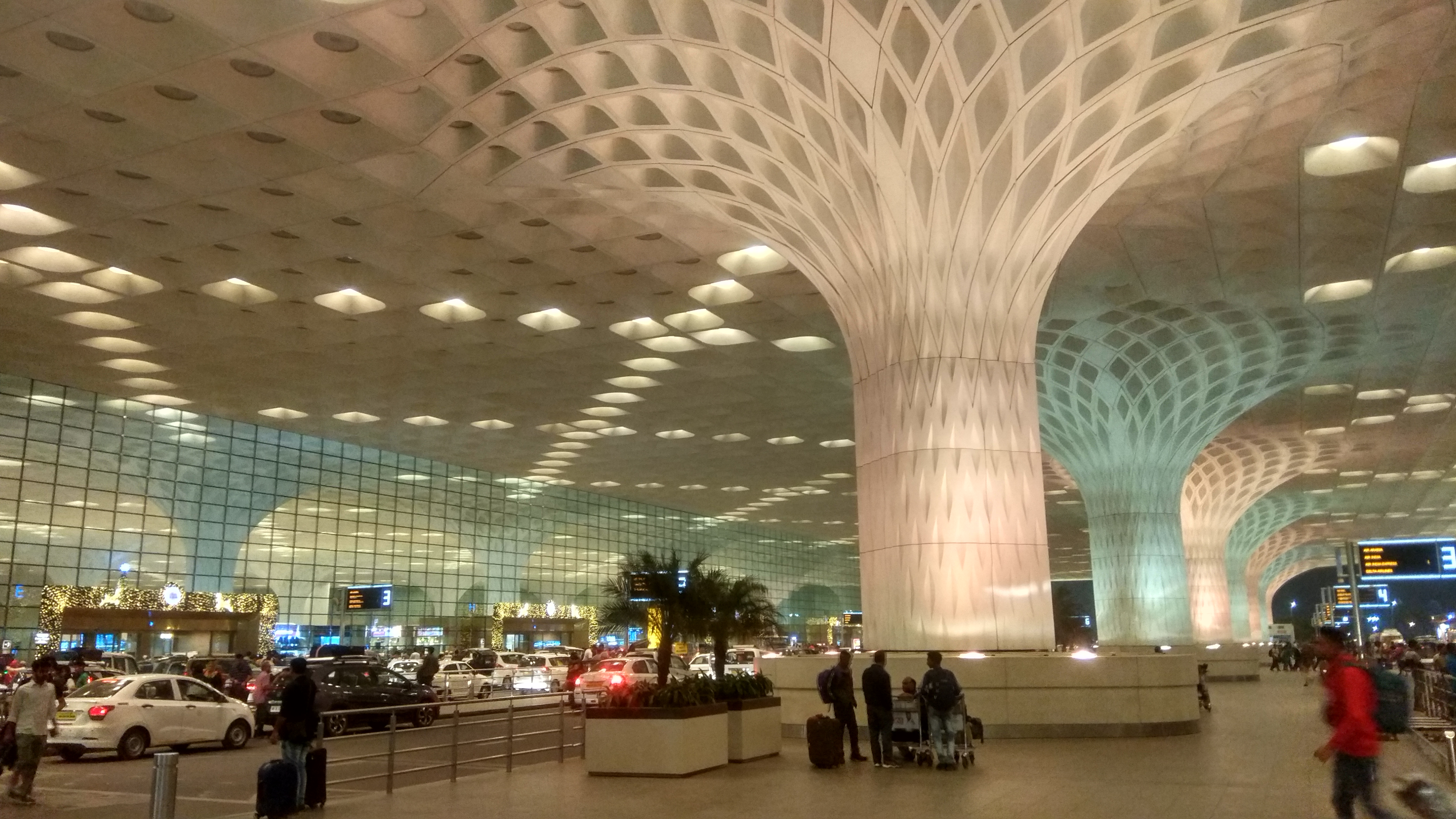
Departure area of Terminal 2

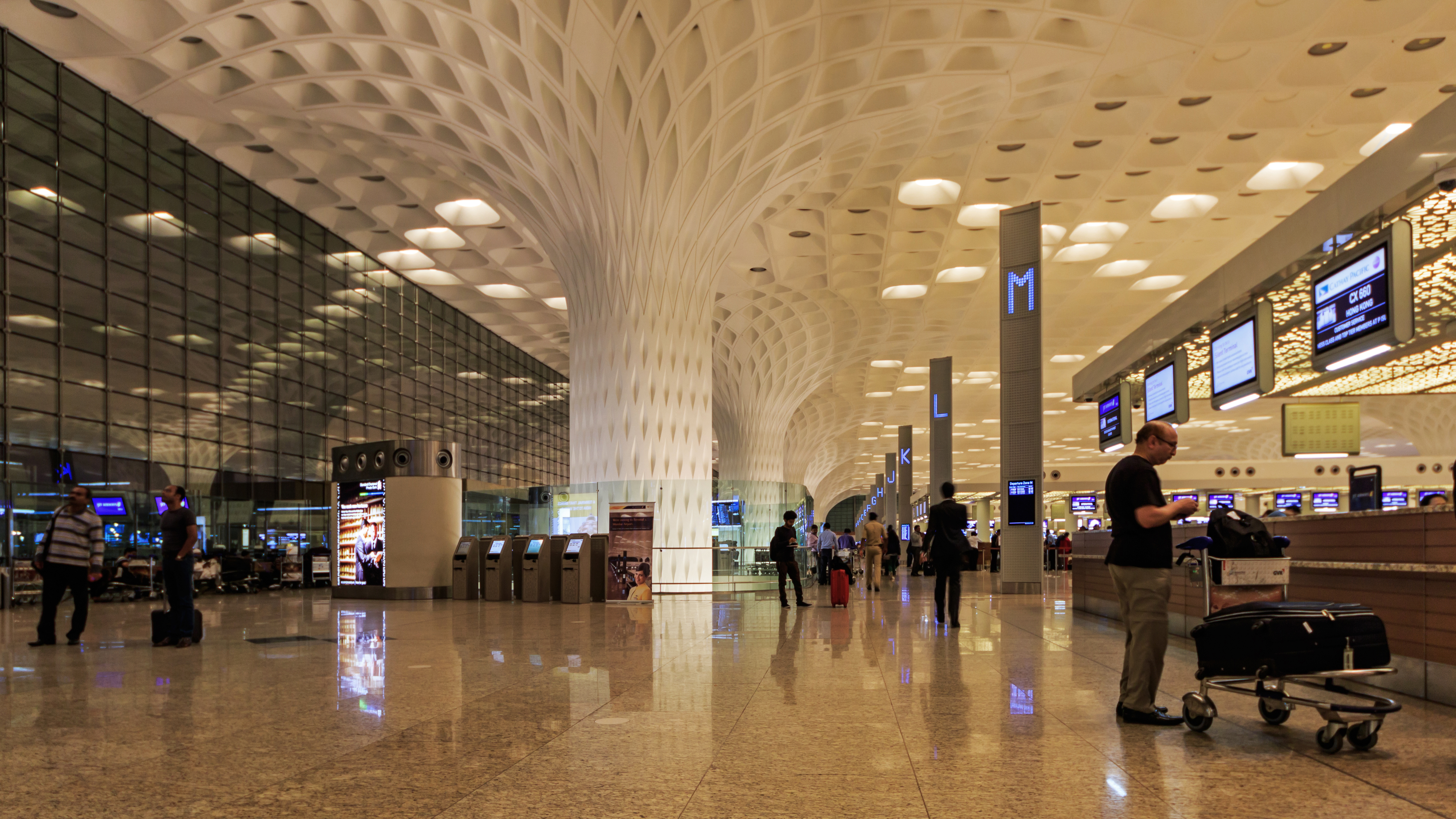
Check-in area of Terminal 2

Larsen & Toubro (L&T) was awarded the contract to construct the new Terminal 2, in order to differentiate it from the Old Terminal 2 Building. Skidmore, Owings & Merrill (SOM) was the architectural designer of the project. SOM also provided the schematic design of structure and MEP and the detailed structural design of the roof. Detailed design of the foundations and the rest of the structure and civil works, the MEP, IT, and airport systems, including the full construction documentation of the project was carried out by L&T's in-house design team, EDRC (Engineering Design and Research Center). The terminal covers a land area of 210,000 square metres (2,300,000 sq ft) and has replaced the Previous International Terminal (which has already been demolished). The entire project was estimated to cost ₹98 billion (US$1.0 billion) and employ over 12,000 workers. The X-shaped terminal has a total floor area of 450,000 square metres (4,800,000 sq ft) across four floors and handles both domestic and international passengers. It includes new taxiways and apron areas for aircraft parking designed to cater to 40 million passengers annually. The structure has boarding gates on two piers extending southwards from a central processing building featuring a 42-metre (138 ft) high roof employing over 20,000 metric tonnes of fabricated steel covering 30 acres (12 ha). However, the eastern pier of Terminal 2 remains truncated due to non-clearance of slums in the adjoining plot, giving an asymmetrical look when seen from above. The new Terminal 2 building operates Multiple Aircraft Ramp System (MARS) stands and swing gates, so that a single stand can accommodate either one wide-body aircraft or two narrow-body aircraft, in either domestic or international configuration. The new terminal is connected by the six-lane Sahar Elevated Access Road to the Western Express Highway. A metro rail link to the terminal is under construction.

The New Terminal has around 21,000 square metres (230,000 sq ft) of retail space, lounges and travel services, over 5,000 square metres (54,000 sq ft) of landscaping and a multi level car park for 5,000 cars. The parking Management System and Revenue control system for the entire MLCP has been designed and supplied by SKIDATA. It has 192 check-in counters and 60 immigration counters for departing passengers, and 14 baggage carousels and 76 immigration counters for arriving passengers. To transfer passengers across its four levels, the building has 48 escalators and 75 elevators. The terminal also features 42 travelators. In the initial phase of development, the apron adjoining Terminal 2 provides a total of 48 stands including 3 Code F stands (for the A380). In the final phase of development, a total of 38 Code E/F contact stands, 14 Code E/F remote stands and 20 Code C remote stands are provided (total 72 stands).

The GVK Lounge, the first common luxury lounge at an airport in India, opened in November 2014. The lounge is open to First class and Business class travellers and can accommodate 440 guests at a time. It is spread over 30,000 square feet (2,800 m^{2}) across two levels of the terminal and has a library, a business centre and fine-dining options, apart from the usual facilities like concierge services, a smoking zone, food and beverage, a bar, a luxury spa, a shower area and a relaxation area. The luxury lounge has won the 'World's Leading Airport Lounge – First Class 2015' award at the World Travel Awards 2015 held in Morocco.

The terminal also houses the Niranta Airport Transit Hotel and the 32-room hotel is the first of its kind in the country. It is located on Level 1 of the terminal and rooms may be booked by passengers who have checked into the airport. IWG plc, operating under the brand Regus operates a shared workspace out of the terminal.

The Old International Terminal was closed permanently at 13:00 on 12 February 2014, and international operations from the New Terminal 2 commenced on the same day. The first arrival was Air India flight 343 (an Airbus A330-200) from Singapore via Chennai, and the first departure was Jet Airways flight 118 (a Boeing 777-300ER) to London. It was inaugurated by the then Prime Minister of India Manmohan Singh. The domestic operations at Terminal 2 were launched on 9 January 2015, with the inaugural flight of Vistara arriving from New Delhi. Vistara initially operated from Level 4 of the Terminal, which is being used only by international passengers, but in July 2015, they shifted to Level 3, which will be used only for domestic operations. Air India shifted all of its domestic operations from Terminal 1A to Terminal 2 on 1 October 2015 making it the second airline to operate domestic flights from the Terminal 2, to ease their International and Domestic passenger transfers, and Jet Airways shifted all of its domestic operations from Terminal 1B and Terminal 1C to Terminal 2 on 15 March 2016, facilitating a seamless transfer experience for its passengers, whereas all other domestic airlines, namely Indigo, Go First, and SpiceJet, took place, both Departure and Arrival, at Terminal 1.

After the demise of Jet Airways on 17 April 2019, other carriers launched additional domestic flights using slots vacated by Jet Airways. These flights were operated from Terminal 2. This arrangement resulted in some of the larger carriers having to operate domestic flights from both terminals. Hence, MIAL moved to streamline operations at both terminals in September 2019, shifting all of its domestic operations of Indigo, AirAsia India and Go First back to Terminal 1, while SpiceJet shifted all of its domestic operations from Terminal 1 to Terminal 2. After GoFirst ceased operations on 3 May 2023 there was vacancy in Terminal 1. On 1 June 2023, Spicejet shifted all of its domestic operations from Terminal 2 back to Terminal 1. Then Terminal 2 was operating Domestic Flights operated by Air India, Air India Express, Indigo (Some Flights), Vistara and all International Flights. Vistara ceased operations and it merged with Air India on 12 November 2024. At present Terminal 2 operates Domestic Flights operated by Air India, Air India Express, Indigo (Some Flights), and all International Flights.

Until 2000-01, the security of the airport was under Maharashtra Police/Mumbai Police. However, following the hijacking of Indian Airlines Flight 814 on 24 December 1999 and September 11 attacks in the United States in 2001, airport security was handed to the Airport Sector division of the Central Industrial Security Force in July 2002.

The airport has free Wi-Fi connectivity provided by Tata Docomo across both Terminal 1 and 2. However, the service has faced severe criticism for being ineffective and complicated access for international passengers, as the passengers need to get an OTP through an Indian phone number only, while the free service lasts for just 45 minutes, following which passengers have to buy data packs. The phone number requirement has been attributed to the requirements of Telecom Regulatory Authority of India for safety considerations. Following frequent criticism, Wi-Fi kiosks were installed for passengers who do not have a local phone number, which can issue coupons after scanning boarding passes and passports and provide 3 hour service.

Key facilities at the New Terminal 2
Facilities	Current	Earlier
Parking stands for aircraft	108	84
Boarding bridges	60	25
Check-in counters	192	135
Car parking	5,000	3,600

Car parking and passenger arrivals

All vehicles arriving at Terminal 2 to pick up arriving passengers are routed via the multi-level car park and are charged a fee to counter traffic congestion at the airport. Four-wheelers are charged a minimum fee of ₹140 (US$1.50) for 30 minutes in general parking and two-wheelers ₹Convert for 240 minutes.

==== General Aviation Terminal ====
The airport's General Aviation (GA) Terminal for private and non-scheduled flight operators (NSOPs) is located at Kalina on the southwest side of the airfield. The terminal was approved for international operations in April 2011, making CSMIA the first airport in India to have a self-contained terminal for handling round the clock domestic and international flight operations for private and NSOPs. The terminal offers facilities for passengers departing and arriving on private aircraft and business jets. The terminal has two exclusive lounges, two conference halls, two crew restrooms and a café bar. It has parking for 24 general aviation aircraft. Once the new airport at Navi Mumbai is opened, most of the business jets, turboprops and charter aircraft parked at CSMIA will be moved to the general aviation bays and hangars of NMIA by the end of 2025. CSMIA will continue to be accessible to charter and private aircraft flyers as general aviation movement is not being banned. However, visiting GA aircraft will take off for some other airport after dropping off its passengers.

MIAL, in its 2025 submission to the Government, said that the existing GA terminal was not sufficient to handle GA traffic. In FY 23, CSMIA handled 12,444 GA aircraft movements and the next fiscal this number rose to 13,831 or an average daily 38 movements. Mumbai's corporate houses tend to use larger chartered aircraft of 180 seating capacity and these and other international GA passengers were currently being handled via T2. The existing general aviation (GA) terminal is to be expanded at a cost of Rs 225 crore, from current floor area of 890 square metres to 10,783 square metres. MIAL proposed to have an integrated terminal for handling both domestic as well as international passengers without mixing of passengers.

=== Previous terminals ===
==== Terminal 1 (divided into Terminal 1A, Terminal 1B, and Terminal 1C) ====
When the Sahar terminal was opened in the 1980s, the terminal at Santacruz reverted to being a domestic terminal. The terminal consisted of three structures, Terminal 1A, Terminal 1B, and Terminal 1C.

Terminal 1A - It was opened in April 1992, and it was used only by Indian Airlines (now Air India). In 2005, Kingfisher Airlines also began operating from Terminal 1A, after it entered into an agreement to source all ground handling and terminal space from Indian Airlines. In June 2013, a year after Kingfisher Airlines ceased operations, MIAL allocated the vacant space to GoAir. On 1 October 2015, Air India shifted all of its domestic operations from Terminal 1A to Terminal 2. GoAir shifed its departure operations from Terminal 1A to Terminal 1B on 1 October 2015, and departures level of Terminal 1A was closed permanently. GoAir, however, continued to use arrivals level of Terminal 1A. On 15 March 2016 GoAir shifted its arrival operations from Terminal 1A to Terminal 1B and Terminal 1A was closed permanently. Demolition of the structure commenced in November 2025 and completed in 2026.

Terminal 1B - It was opened in 1942, and This was the original Santacruz building that was Mumbai's first passenger terminal which was once integrated, and after the opening of the Sahar International Airport Terminal 2 for international operations it became a domestic operations terminal.

Terminal 1C - It was built at a cost of ₹ 3 billion and opened in April 2010. Architectural design was provided by Hafeez Contractor. EDRC, the in-house design unit of the EPC contractor Larsen & Toubro (L&T) performed the Structural, MEP and IT/Airport systems design. The terminal had six passenger boarding bridges and allowed connectivity between Terminal 1A and Terminal 1B. It was spread over 297,194 sq ft across three levels and had a seating capacity of about 900 passengers. Level 1 housed the offices of MIAL and some airlines, Level 2 comprised the security-hold area for passengers after checking in at either Terminal 1A or 1B. Level 3 accommodated a food court. The building served as a boarding-only facility for all airlines. Passengers entered this facility via Terminal 1B.

In January 2017, MIAL renamed Terminal 1B and Terminal 1C as Terminal 1.

==== Terminal 2 (divided into 2A, 2B, and 2C) ====
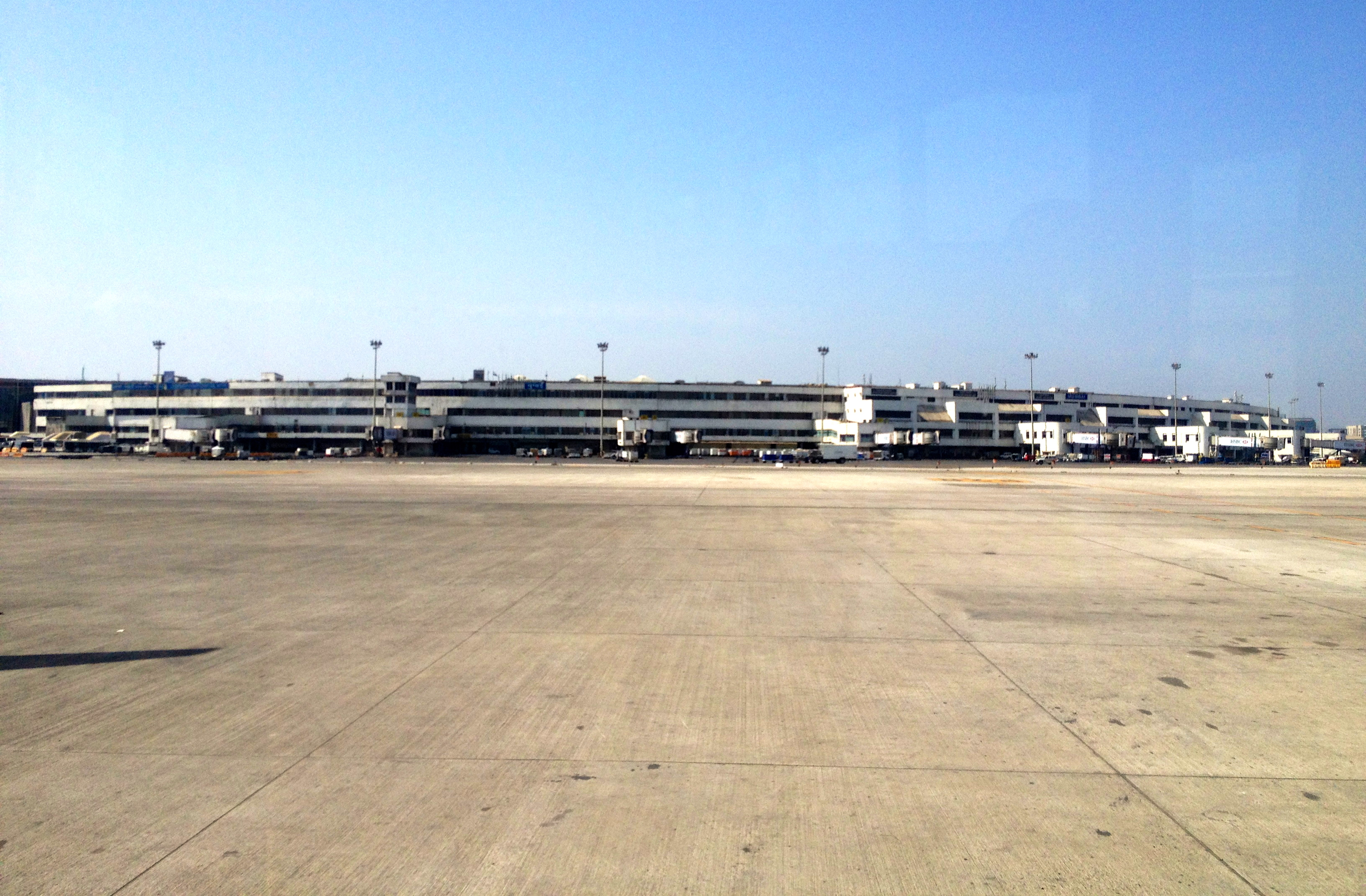
Terminal 2B and 2C as seen from the runway before being decommissioned and demolished

Terminal 2 is located at Sahar Village, in Vile Parle East. Designed by Aéroports de Paris, Terminal 2 was built in three modular phases as Terminal 2A, Terminal 2B, and Terminal 2C. Each module had a capacity of 2.5 million annual passengers. This terminal had an area of 120,000 m^{2} (1,300,000 sq ft). The terminal structure was laid out in a space-saving vertical arrangement with separate levels for arrivals and departures. An overpass on the city-side took passengers to the upper-level departure forecourt.

The original terminal was a convex shaped single concourse building with 14 Code E contact stands. The greater Terminal 2 apron also provided a further 15 Code D/E and 6 Code C remote stands. This gave a total of 35 stands on the existing apron. The departures section of 2A had 42 check-in counters, 18 more than in the international section at the Santacruz terminal. After completing customs and immigration formalities, the departing travellers were led down to a mezzanine floor where five elongated nodules connect the terminal with the aircraft via aerobridges.

Terminal 2A - This first phase of the terminal complex was completed at a cost of ₹180 million (US$1.9 million) and it was opened in January 1981. It served most of the International Flights. Its boarding gates 3 to 8 were the first aerobridges installed in the subcontinent. Terminal 2A was decommissioned and demolished in January 2009 to make way for the New Terminal 2 structure.

Terminal 2B - It cost ₹220 million (US$2.4 million) and it was opened in 1984. It served Air India and Some Flights handled by Air India between September 1986 and October 1999 and was decommissioned when Terminal 2C opened. It was extensively refurbished and made operational once again following the demolition of Terminal 2A.

Terminal 2C - It was in October 1999, it was originally operated by Air India, Air India Express and some Grounded Flights were handled by Air India.

Terminal 2B and Terminal 2C were decommissioned in February 2014 when the new Terminal 2 became operational. Terminal 2B and Terminal 2C were demolished later in 2014 so that remainder of the New Terminal 2 could be completed.

=== Cargo Complex ===
The Air Cargo Complex, located west of the International Passenger Terminal 2, has been in operation since 1977. The cargo apron is capable of handling five wide-bodied aircraft. In 2009–10, the airport handled 385,937 metric tonnes of International Cargo and 165,252 metric tonnes of Domestic Cargo. Air India (AI) and Mumbai International Airport Pvt Ltd (MIAL) have been appointed as custodians of cargo by the Central Board of Excise and Customs at Mumbai. The Cargo Terminal has a Centre for Perishable Cargo (CPC) with an area of 1844 m^{2} for perishable and temperature-sensitive international export shipments, strong rooms of 115 m^{2} for storage of valuable cargo and storage areas for dangerous goods in both import and export warehouses, dedicated Unaccompanied Baggage handling and clearance areas and 9 coloured X-ray cargo screening machines for export cargo.

Apart from handling 65% of the international volumes at CSIA, MIAL also operates a Common User Domestic Cargo Facility. After taking over the redevelopment work of the airport in 2006, MIAL commissioned an offshore Common User Terminal (CUT) near the Marol pipeline as a temporary arrangement. In June 2016, MIAL opened a new domestic cargo CUT near the Western Express Highway in Vile Parle.

The CUT has been outsourced to Concor Air Ltd. on a Build-operate-transfer basis. The terminal has the capacity to handle 300,000 metric tonnes of cargo annually and is built on an area of 60,000 square feet. The Cargo Terminal is an "elevated terminal structure" where all arriving domestic cargo is managed from the basement level while departing cargo is handled at the upper level. Air India and Blue Dart handle their own domestic cargo operations at their own terminals. Blue Dart opened its dedicated cargo facility at Mumbai Airport near Terminal 1 on 7 February 2019. The facility measures 4,300 square meters and has air-side and city-side access, allowing for faster transfer of shipments.

== Airlines and destinations ==
=== Passenger ===
Airlines	Destinations
Air Arabia	Sharjah
Air Arabia Abu Dhabi	Abu Dhabi
Air Astana	Almaty
Air France	Paris–Charles de Gaulle
Air India	Ahmedabad, Amritsar, Bangkok–Suvarnabhumi, Bengaluru, Bhubaneswar, Bhopal, Bhuj, Chandigarh, Chennai, Coimbatore, Colombo–Bandaranaike, Dammam, Dehradun, Delhi, Dhaka, Doha, Dubai–International, Frankfurt, Goa–Dabolim, Hyderabad, Indore, Jaipur, Jaisalmer, Jammu, Jamnagar, Jeddah, Jodhpur, Kochi, Kolkata, London–Heathrow, Lucknow, Mauritius, Nagpur, New York–JFK, Newark, Patna, Rajkot, Riyadh, Singapore, Srinagar, Thiruvananthapuram, Tokyo–Haneda, Udaipur, Vadodara, Varanasi, Vijayawada; Seasonal: Toronto–Pearson
Air India Express	Abu Dhabi, Ahmedabad, Bengaluru, Bhubaneswar, Bhopal, Chandigarh, Coimbatore, Dammam, Dehradun, Delhi, Dubai–International, Goa–Dabolim, Goa–Mopa, Hyderabad, Jaipur, Jamnagar, Jeddah, Jodhpur, Kannur, Kuwait City, Lucknow, Mangaluru, Muscat, Nagpur, Patna, Ranchi, Riyadh, Sharjah, Srinagar, Tiruchirappalli, Varanasi
Air Mauritius	Mauritius
Air Tanzania	Dar es Salaam
Akasa Air	Ahmedabad, Ayodhya, Bengaluru, Chennai, Darbhanga, Delhi, Doha, Goa–Mopa, Guwahati, Gwalior, Hanoi, Jaipur, Jeddah, Kochi, Kolkata, Kozhikode, Kuwait City, Lucknow, Noida, Phuket, Prayagraj, Riyadh, Siliguri, Srinagar, Udaipur, Varanasi
All Nippon Airways	Tokyo–Narita
Alliance Air	Ahmedabad, Amravati, Bhavnagar, Bhuj, Daman, Diu, Jalgaon, Keshod, Porbandar
Azerbaijan Airlines	Baku
Batik Air Malaysia	Kuala Lumpur–International
Bhutan Airlines	Seasonal: Paro
British Airways	London–Heathrow
Cathay Pacific	Hong Kong
Egyptair	Cairo
Emirates	Dubai–International
Ethiopian Airlines	Addis Ababa
Etihad Airways	Abu Dhabi
Flyadeal	Riyadh
Flydubai	Dubai–International
Flynas	Jeddah, Riyadh
Gulf Air	Bahrain
IndiGo	Abu Dhabi, Adampur, Agra, Ahmedabad, Almaty, Amritsar, Amsterdam, Athens, Aurangabad, Ayodhya, Bahrain, Bangkok–Suvarnabhumi, Bengaluru, Bhopal, Bhubaneshwar, Chandigarh, Chennai, Coimbatore, Colombo–Bandaranaike, Dammam, Darbhanga, Dar es Salaam (begins 20 November 2026), Dehradun, Delhi, Denpasar (resumes 1 March 2027), Deoghar, Dhaka, Doha, Dubai–International, Durgapur, Fujairah, Goa–Dabolim, Goa–Mopa, Gorakhpur, Guwahati, Gwalior, Hanoi, Hubli, Hyderabad, Indore, Istanbul, Itanagar, Jabalpur, Jaipur, Jaisalmer, Jakarta–Soekarno-Hatta, Jammu, Jamnagar, Jeddah, Jodhpur, Kannur, Kanpur, Kathmandu, Kochi, Kolkata, Kozhikode, Kuwait City, Leh, Lucknow, Madurai, Mahé, Malé, Mangaluru, Medina, Muscat, Nagpur, Nairobi–Jomo Kenyatta, Noida, Patna, Phuket, Port Blair, Prayagraj, Raipur, Rajamahendravaram, Rajkot, Ranchi, Ras Al Khaimah, Riyadh, Sharjah, Silchar, Siliguri, Singapore, Srinagar, Tashkent, Tbilisi, Thiruvananthapuram, Tiruchirappalli, Udaipur, Vadodara, Varanasi, Vijayawada, Visakhapatnam
Iraqi Airways	Baghdad
Jazeera Airways	Kuwait City
Kenya Airways	Nairobi–Jomo Kenyatta
KLM	Amsterdam
Kuwait Airways	Kuwait City
Lufthansa	Frankfurt, Munich
Malaysia Airlines	Kuala Lumpur–International
Nepal Airlines	Kathmandu
Oman Air	Muscat
Philippine Airlines	Manila (begins 16 December 2026)
Qatar Airways	Doha
Riyadh Air	Riyadh
Royal Jordanian	Amman–Queen Alia
SalamAir	Muscat
Saudia	Jeddah, Riyadh
Scandinavian Airlines	Copenhagen
Singapore Airlines	Singapore
SpiceJet	Ahmedabad, Bengaluru, Chennai, Darbhanga, Delhi, Dubai–International, Goa–Dabolim, Goa–Mopa, Gorakhpur, Hyderabad, Imphal, Jammu, Kandla, Kochi, Kolkata, Kozhikode, Phuket, Porbandar, Siliguri, Srinagar, Udaipur; Seasonal: Patna
SriLankan Airlines	Colombo–Bandaranaike
Star Air	Belgaum, Hyderabad, Indore, Kolhapur, Mundra, Solapur
Swiss International Air Lines	Zürich
Thai Airways International	Bangkok–Suvarnabhumi
Thai Lion Air	Bangkok–Don Mueang
Thai VietJet Air	Bangkok–Suvarnabhumi, Phuket
Uganda Airlines	Entebbe
Uzbekistan Airways	Tashkent
VietJet Air	Hanoi, Ho Chi Minh City
Vietnam Airlines	Hanoi, Ho Chi Minh City
Virgin Atlantic	London–Heathrow
Yemenia	Seasonal: Aden, Sanaa

=== Cargo ===
Airlines	Destinations
Amazon Air	Bengaluru, Delhi, Hyderabad
Astral Aviation	Sharjah
Blue Dart Aviation	Ahmedabad, Bengaluru, Chennai, Delhi, Hyderabad, Kolkata
Challenge Airlines	Tel Aviv
China Airlines Cargo	Taipei–Taoyuan
CMA CGM Air Cargo	Guangzhou, Paris–Charles de Gaulle
Ethiopian Cargo	Addis Ababa, Guangzhou, Hanoi, Kuwait City, Xiamen
IndiGo CarGo	Delhi, Durgapur, Sharjah
Lufthansa Cargo	Hanoi
MASkargo	Kuala Lumpur–International
Qatar Airways Cargo	Doha, Macau
Saudia Cargo	Dammam, Jeddah, Riyadh
SpiceXpress	Singapore
Turkish Cargo	Colombo–Bandaranaike, Doha, Dubai–Al Maktoum, Hanoi, Istanbul

== Ground transport ==
- Vile Parle is a railway station on the Western line and Harbour line of the Mumbai Suburban Railway network closest to both T1 and T2 of the airport.
- Line 3 (Mumbai Metro) has stations at Terminal 1 and Terminal 2.
- Airport Road and Marol Naka are the stations on Line 1 of the Mumbai Metro system closest to Terminal T2.
- Western Express Highway (WEH) is the station on Line 1 of the Mumbai Metro system closest to Terminal T1.

The Brihanmumbai Electricity Supply and Transport Undertaking (BEST) operates air-conditioned buses to the Airport from Thane, Navi Mumbai, Borivali, South Mumbai and Andheri railway station which can be booked on the Chalo App. The Navi Mumbai Municipal Transport (NMMT) runs bus services to the Airport from various nodes of Navi Mumbai.

=== Airport metro stations ===
Line 3 of the Mumbai Metro serves CSMIA via three stations – one each at the Santacruz and Sahar terminals and one in the GVK SkyCity. The stations, part of the 12.5 kilometre Phase 1 route that runs between Bandra Kurla Complex (BKC) and Aarey JVLR, were opened to the public on 7 October 2024 and the full line extension to Cuffe Parade completed in October 2025.

In early 2012, the MMRDA held talks with MIAL to either construct or finance the construction of three of the line's stations. MIAL agreed to bear the cost of constructing the three stations, expected to total ₹ 777 crore, because of the potential increase in passenger convenience. However, CSIA placed conditions before MMRDA for the corridor;

- The metro line should operate twenty-four hours a day in order to serve passengers of international flights scheduled at odd hours.
- A provision be made for a check-in facility at all metro stations.

MIAL specified that the commercial rights of the three stations it constructs will fully rest with the authority, and that revenue earned from any commercial activity on the premises would go to MIAL. It would undertake the design and civil construction of the stations, costing ₹ 600 crore, on its own, and would pay the estimated cost of electromechanical equipment (around ₹ 177 crore) to MMRDA in three equal instalments over three years. MIAL inserted a 'metro component' in the User Development Fee charged at Mumbai Airport from 2016 to February 2023 to raise Rs 518 crore for metro connectivity. The charges of Rs 20 and Rs 120 per domestic and international departure respectively were levied until the target sum was raised.

=== Upcoming airport metro stations ===
Line 7A is an extension of the 16.475 km (10.237 mi) long 'Red Line' that will connect to T2. The line will have an underground station at CSMIA. Civil work on this line began in early 2020. Tunnelling work began in November 2023 and was completed in July 2025.

The MMRDA has also planned Line 8 between CSMIA and Navi Mumbai International Airport.

== Awards ==
Along with Delhi Airport, the airport was adjudged the "World's Best Airport" at Airport Service Quality Awards 2017 in the highest category of airports handling more than 40 million passengers annually by Airports Council International. It has also won the "Best Airport in India and Central Asia" award at the Skytrax 2016 World Airport Awards. It is one of the three airports in India to have implemented Airport Collaborative Decision Making (A-CDM) to ensure timely takeoffs and landings. The airport was awarded as the Best Airport In the Asia-Pacific in 2020 (over 40 million passengers per annum) by Airports Council International. In March 2023, the airport was named again as the "Best Airport in the Asia-Pacific" in the category of over 40 million passengers per annum by Airports Council International. In July 2023, the airport was ranked fourth on the list of top 10 favourite airports in the world by Travel + Leisure.

== Accidents and incidents ==
=== 1940s ===
- On 12 July 1949, Franeker, a Lockheed L-749-79-33 Constellation (registered PH-TDF) crashed into hills between Ghatkopar and Powai killing 33 passengers and 11 crew members. The victims included a large number of American journalists including Pulitzer Prize winner Hubert Renfro Knickerbocker. The crash was a result of a pilot error.

=== 1950s ===
- On 19 July 1959, Rani of Aera, a Lockheed L-1049G Super Constellation (registered VT-DIN) carrying 46 people (39 passengers and seven crew) approached Santacruz Airport in conditions of poor visibility due to rain. The captain was using an altimeter with the barometric pressure set at 29.92". The aircraft crashed and suffered damage beyond repair. There were no fatalities.

=== 1960s ===
- On 16 August 1963, a ČSA Tupolev Tu-104A (registration OK-LDB) caught fire and burned out while being refuelled at Santacruz Airport; no casualties except for a flight attendant who was injured after jumping from the plane.
- On 28 May 1968, Garuda Indonesian Airways Flight 892, a Convair 990A bound for Amsterdam but was on its next flight segment from Bombay to Karachi, crashed minutes after takeoff from Santacruz Airport. All 29 on board and one on the ground died.

=== 1970s ===
- On 23 January 1971, during a training flight for practice, an Air India Boeing 707-437 (registered VT-DJI), went off the runway to the right while performing a 3-engined takeoff, and no. 3 and 4 engines struck a mound 9 feet high located 188 feet from the edge of the runway and were torn off. The wing structure broke off progressively inward and an intense fire broke out. There were no casualties among the 5 crew members, but the 11 year old Boeing 707 was damaged beyond repair and written off.
- On 12 June 1975, Air France Flight 193, a Boeing 747-128 (N28888) operating the sector between Bombay (now Mumbai), and Tel Aviv to Paris-Charles de Gaulle Airport was destroyed by fire on the ground at Bombay's Santa Cruz Airport, following an aborted takeoff. The aircraft's tire on its right-hand main undercarriage had failed while the flight deck crew was executing a 180 degree turn at the beginning of Santa Cruz Airport's runway 27. When the flight deck crew began its takeoff run, another tire failed. At that point the plane's wheels and braking assembly came into contact with the runway, starting a fire. The crew aborted takeoff. The ensuing delay in shutting down the engines, as well as the improper deployment of the airport's fire service, caused the fire to spread, leading to the plane's total destruction. There were no fatalities among the 394 occupants (18 crew and 376 passengers).
- On 12 October 1976, Indian Airlines Flight 171, a Sud Aviation SE 210 Caravelle, crashed while attempting an emergency landing after an engine fire. All 89 passengers and 6 crew members were killed in the crash. A fatigue crack in the No. 2 engine's 10th stage high-pressure compressor disk had caused it to disintegrate, which severed the fuel lines and caused the engine fire that led to a loss of control.
- On 1 January 1978, Air India Flight 855 Emperor Ashoka, a Boeing 747-237B (registered VT-EBD) crashed into the Arabian Sea post taking off, killing all 190 passengers and 23 crew on board. The cause of the crash was the captain becoming spatially disoriented and losing control of the aircraft after the failure of one of the flight instruments. The aircraft was the first Boeing 747 delivered to Air India.
- On 21 September 1979, a big fire erupted at the International Terminal; three passengers died in the aftermath. Authorities battled the blaze for many hours.

=== 1980s ===
- On 21 June 1982, Air India Flight 403, a Boeing 707–420 (Reg: VT-DJJ) carrying 99 passengers and 12 crew from Kuala Lumpur to Bombay via Madras crashed while landing during a rainstorm. The fuselage broke apart and 17 people including two crew members were killed. The cause of the crash was flight crew error, as the plane undershot the runway while landing due to miscalculation. It was the first Boeing 707 delivered to Air India in 1960.

=== 1990s ===
- On 12 March 1993, the airport was targeted in a terrorist attack after grenades were thrown near the vicinity as part of the 1993 Mumbai bombings, however there were no casualties.

=== 2000s ===
- On 30 July 2005 at 6:55 AM local time, Air India Flight 127, a Boeing 747-400 (registered VT-EVJ), flying from Bangalore to Chicago with stops at Mumbai and Frankfurt, skidded on landing at Mumbai on runway 14/32 due to hydroplaning, and damaged the nose wheel landing gear after hitting a few runway lights. While there were no injuries among the 335 passengers and crew, the immobilised plane sustained serious damage and was taken out of service to be repaired in a hangar. An alternative Boeing 747-400 was made available to continue the flight, which took off after a delay of four hours. The incident took place four days after the airport was closed due to heavy floods and two days after reopening.
- On 16 May 2008, a Boeing 777-200 (registered as VT-AIK) operating as Air India flight 717 to Dubai collapsed at Mumbai, after the nose landing gear failed. The incident took place before the passengers were about to board. There were no fatalities or injuries, however, the plane suffered serious damage and was off service for repairs, while an alternative aircraft was arranged for the flight.
- On 4 September 2009, Air India Flight 829 a Boeing 747–437 (registered VT-ESM), flying from Mumbai to Riyadh caught fire at the Airport. The fire started in the number one engine due to fuel leak while the aircraft was taxiing to Runway 27 for take-off. An emergency evacuation was carried out with no injuries among the 229 people (213 passengers and 16 crew) on board. As the fire damage was substantial and spread to the engine pylon, which required time consuming repairs, the Boeing 747-400 was declared a total loss and thus written off. The plane was scrapped in May 2011 for parts.

=== 2020s ===
- On 6 May 2021, a Jet Serve Aviation (registration VT-JIL) air ambulance flight carrying two crew, a doctor, a COVID-19 patient, and one of the patient's relatives performed a belly landing after losing a wheel earlier in the flight while departing from a refuelling stop in Nagpur. Airport firefighters sprayed foam onto the runway to prevent fire, and there were no injuries.
- On 14 September 2023, a VSR Aviation (Reg: VT-DBL) Learjet 45 carrying two crew and eight passengers, arriving from Visakhapatnam, crash-landed at the airport due to heavy rain and thunderstorm. This impacted the airport's busy flight schedule delaying and diverting more than 40 flights to and from the city.
- On 20 May 2024, Emirates Flight 508, a Boeing 777-300ER (registered as A6-ENT), suffered a bird strike before landing at Mumbai. While there were no injuries among passengers and crew, the plane suffered substantial damage and at least 36 flamingos were killed in the strike while the plane was flying over Ghatkopar suburban region of Mumbai. An alternative aircraft was arranged for the return flight, while the damaged plane was later repaired and put back into service.

== See also ==
- List of airports in India
- List of the busiest airports in India
- Mumbai Port Trust
- Navi Mumbai International Airport
