= Sahar Village, Mumbai =

Sahar Village Sahar Complex
- Locality
- Nickname: Sahar Gaon
- Location within Mumbai
- Coordinates: 19°5′56″N 72°52′2″E
- Country: India
- State: Maharashtra
- District: Mumbai Suburban
- City: Mumbai

Government
  - Type: Municipal Corporation
  - Body: Brihanmumbai Municipal Corporation (MCGM)
  - corporator: Sushama Kamlesh Rai

Languages
  - Official: Marathi
- Time zone: UTC+5:30 (IST)
- PIN: 400099
- Area code: 022

Sahar Village lies in the Andheri East suburb of Mumbai. It is among the oldest settlements of Bombay East Indians on Salsette Island. The village had a station on the Salsette–Trombay Railway that was dismantled after the rail line closed in 1934.

The opening of the Sahar International Terminal (Terminal 2) of the Chhatrapati Shivaji International Airport in the 1980s led to subsequent urban development in the area. This includes the opening of the first hotel of The Leela Group in 1988. Its nearby areas are Vile Parle, Marol, JB Nagar, Chakala, and Saki Naka.
