= Ram V. Sutar =

Indian sculptor (1925–2025)

Ram Sutar
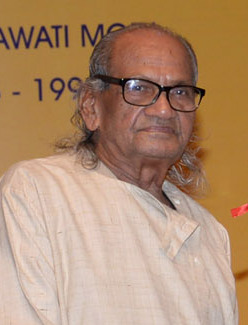
- Sutar in 2018
- Born: Ram Vanji Sutar; 19 February 1925; Gondur, Khandesh District, Bombay Presidency, British India
- Died: 18 December 2025 (aged 100); Noida, Uttar Pradesh, India
- Education: Sir J. J. School of Art
- Occupation: Sculptor
- Notable work: Statue of Unity; Statue of Prosperity; Statue of Mahatma Gandhi, Parliament of India
- Spouse: Pramila Sutar
- Awards: Maharashtra Bhushan (2024); Padma Bhushan (2016); Tagore Award (2016); Padma Shri (1999)

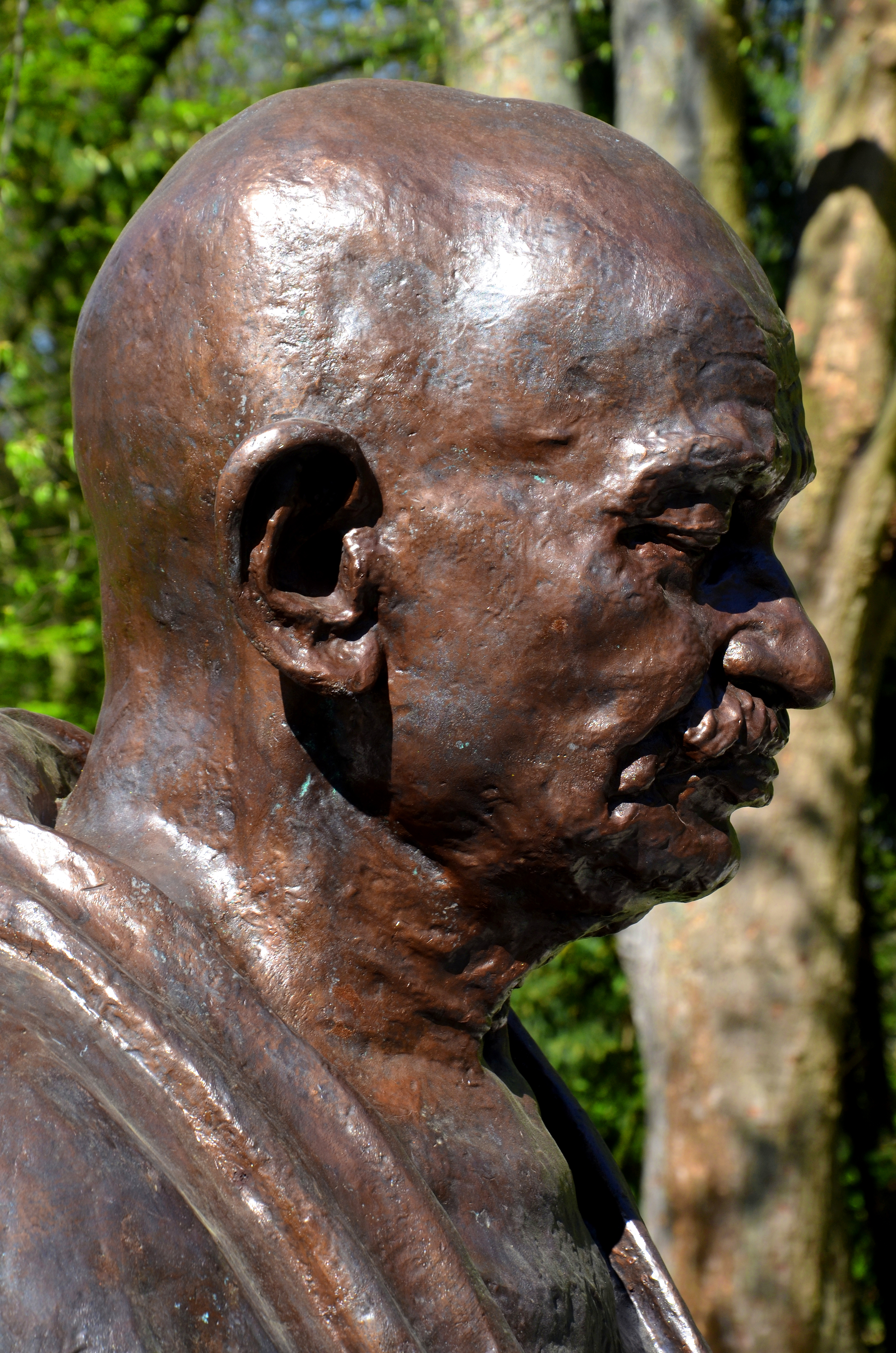
Sculpture of Mahatma Gandhi by Ram V. Sutar in Hanover

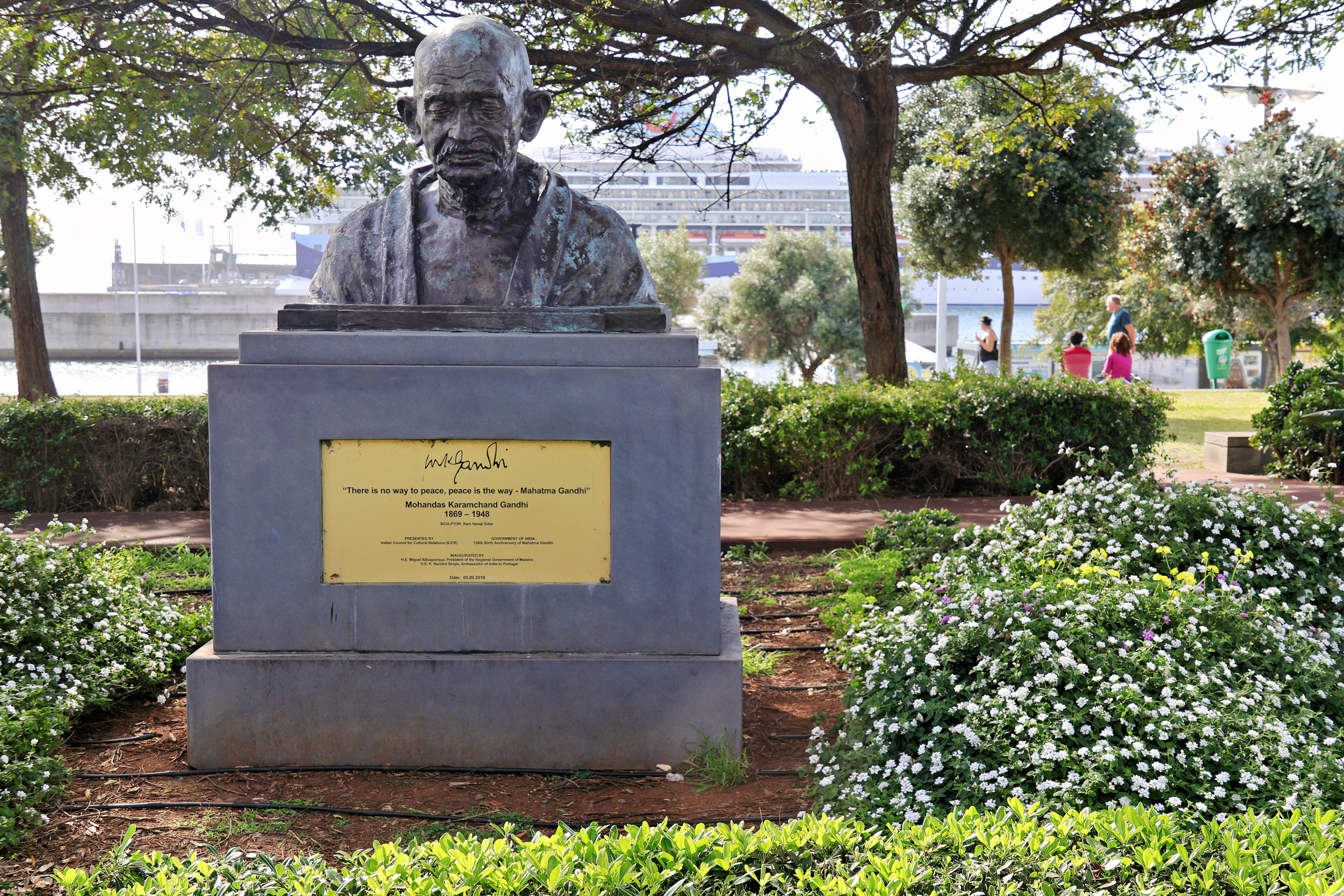
Sculpture of Mahatma Gandhi by Ram V. Sutar in Funchal

Ram Vanji Sutar (19 February 1925 – 18 December 2025) was an Indian sculptor. He designed the Statue of Unity which is the world's tallest statue with a height of 182 metres (597 feet), exceeding the Spring Temple Buddha by 54 metres.

== Background ==
Sutar was born in a Viswakarma Brahmin family, on 19 February 1925, in the village of Gondur, in Khandesh district of Bombay Presidency. In 1952, he married Pramila. He died on 18 December 2025, at the age of 100.

== Career ==
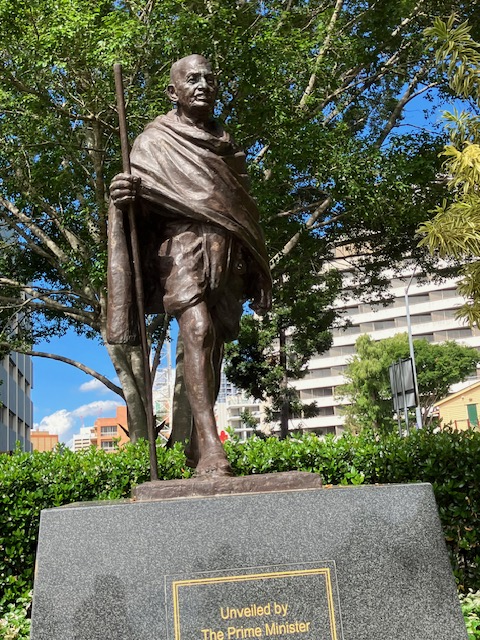
Roma Street Parkland, Brisbane, 2024

Sutar designed the Statue of Unity, the tallest statue in the world located in Gujarat. He also erected the 14 m-tall Chambal monument, as well as a bust of Mahatma Gandhi which has been replicated and sent to other nations. He designed the statue of Mahatma Gandhi in a seated position, located at the Parliament of India. A larger replica of the same was made by him at the Vidhana Soudha. He was also the designer of the 33 m-tall Kempe Gowda statue at the Bengaluru International Airport.

Brisbane's Indian community commissioned a statue of Gandhi, created by Ram V. Sutar and Anil Sutar at Roma Street Parkland, It was unveiled by Narendra Modi, then Prime Minister of India in 2014.

== Awards ==
In 1999, he received the Padma Shri and later in 2016, Padma Bhushan from the Government of India. In October 2018, Sutar received the Tagore Award for cultural harmony of 2016. He was chosen for Maharashtra Bhushan, the state government's highest civilian award. Maharashtra's Chief Minister Devendra Fadnavis informed the legislative assembly on 20 March 2025.

== Works ==
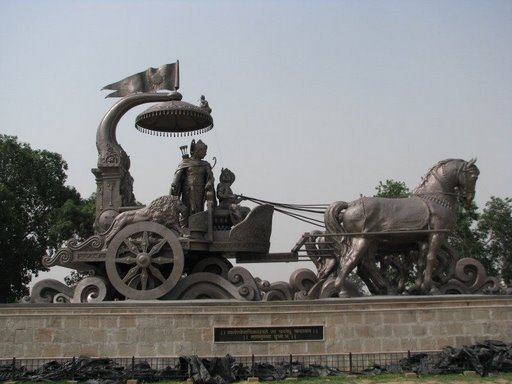
Krishna Arjun Rath Monument at Brahma Sarovar. Bronze statue, by Ram V. and Anil R. Sutar, 2008.

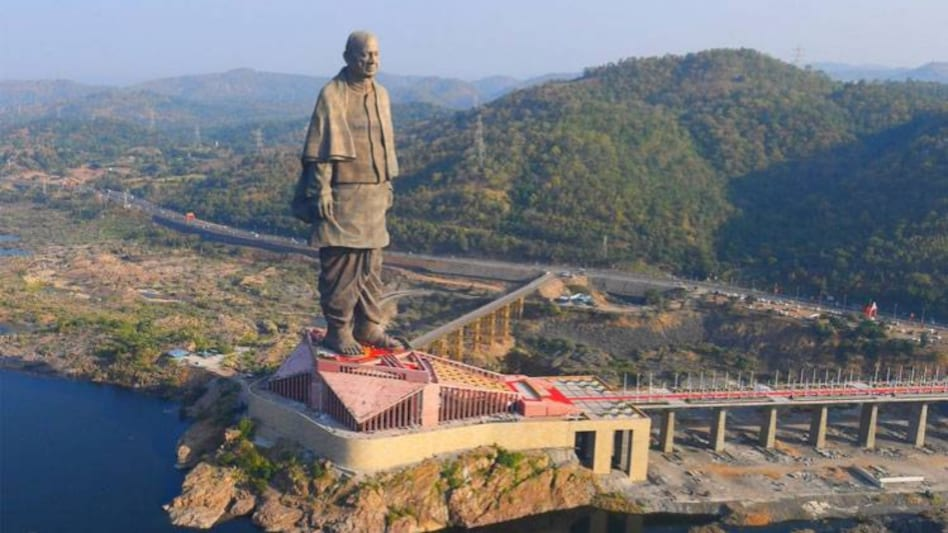
Statue of Unity, Narmada district. Bronze, 2018

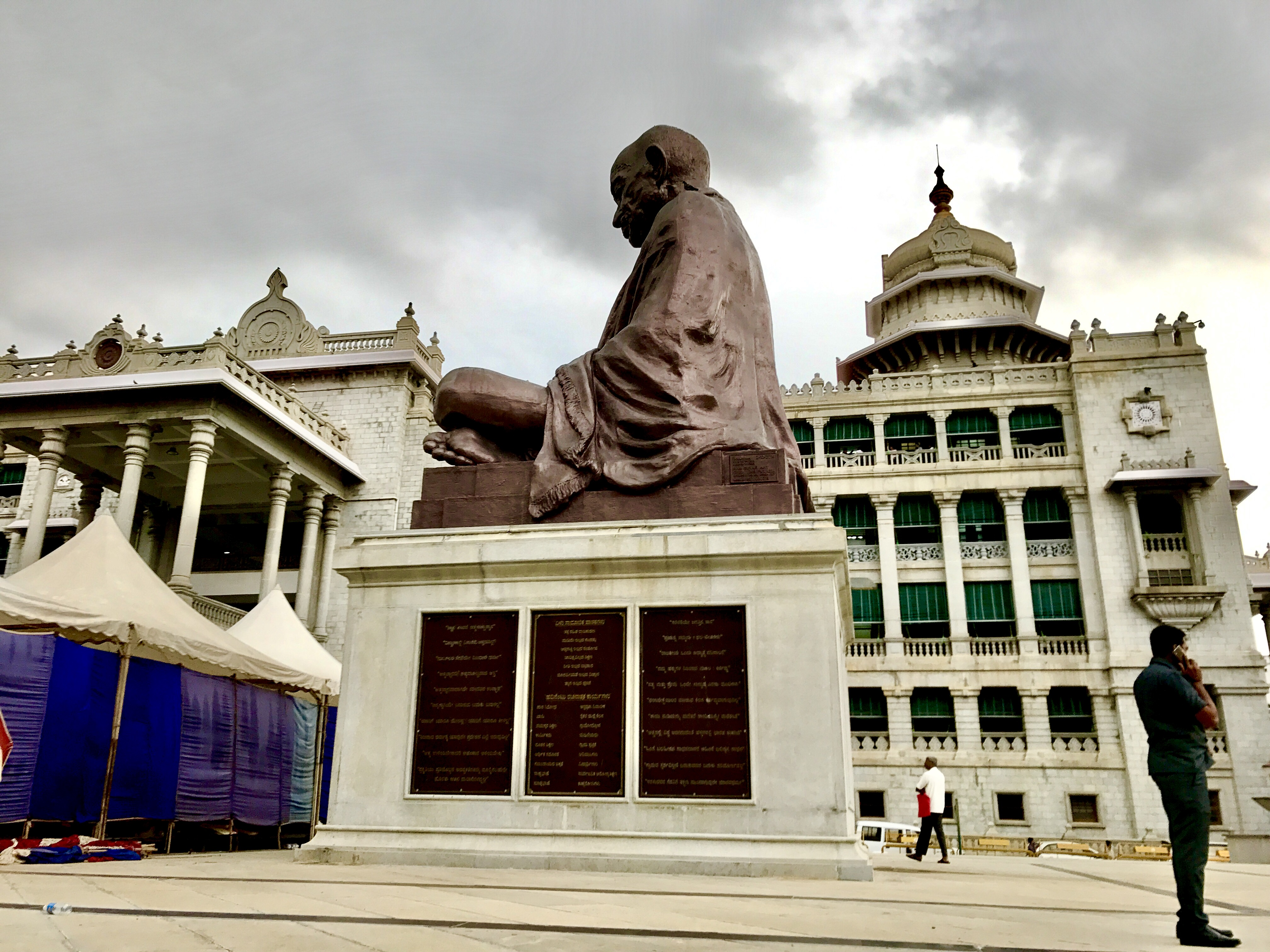
Statue of Mahatma Gandhi, Vidhan Soudha. Bronze, 2014

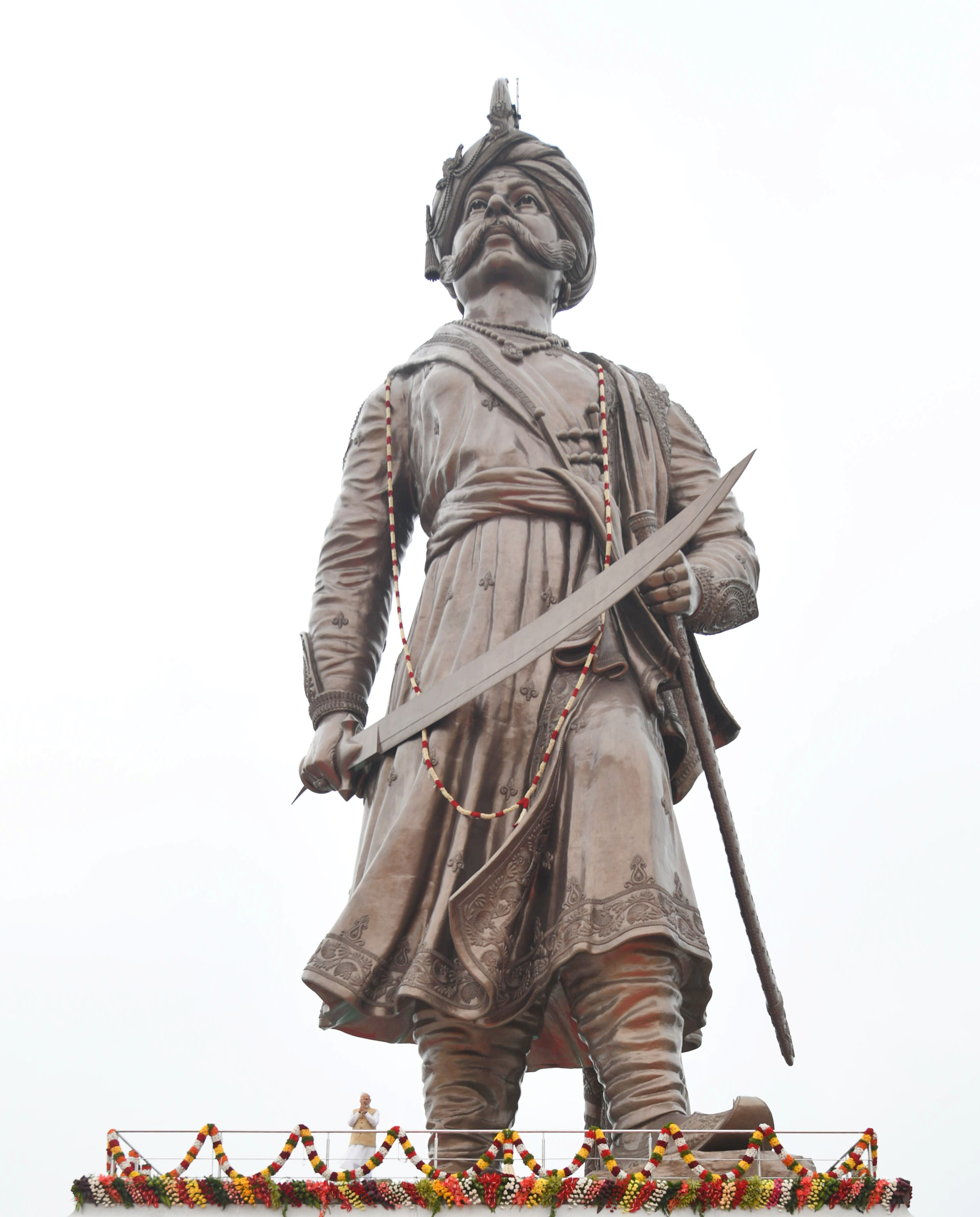
Statue of Prosperity, Kempegowda IA, Bangalore. Bronze, 2022
