= Statue of Prosperity =

World's tallest bronze statue of a city founder

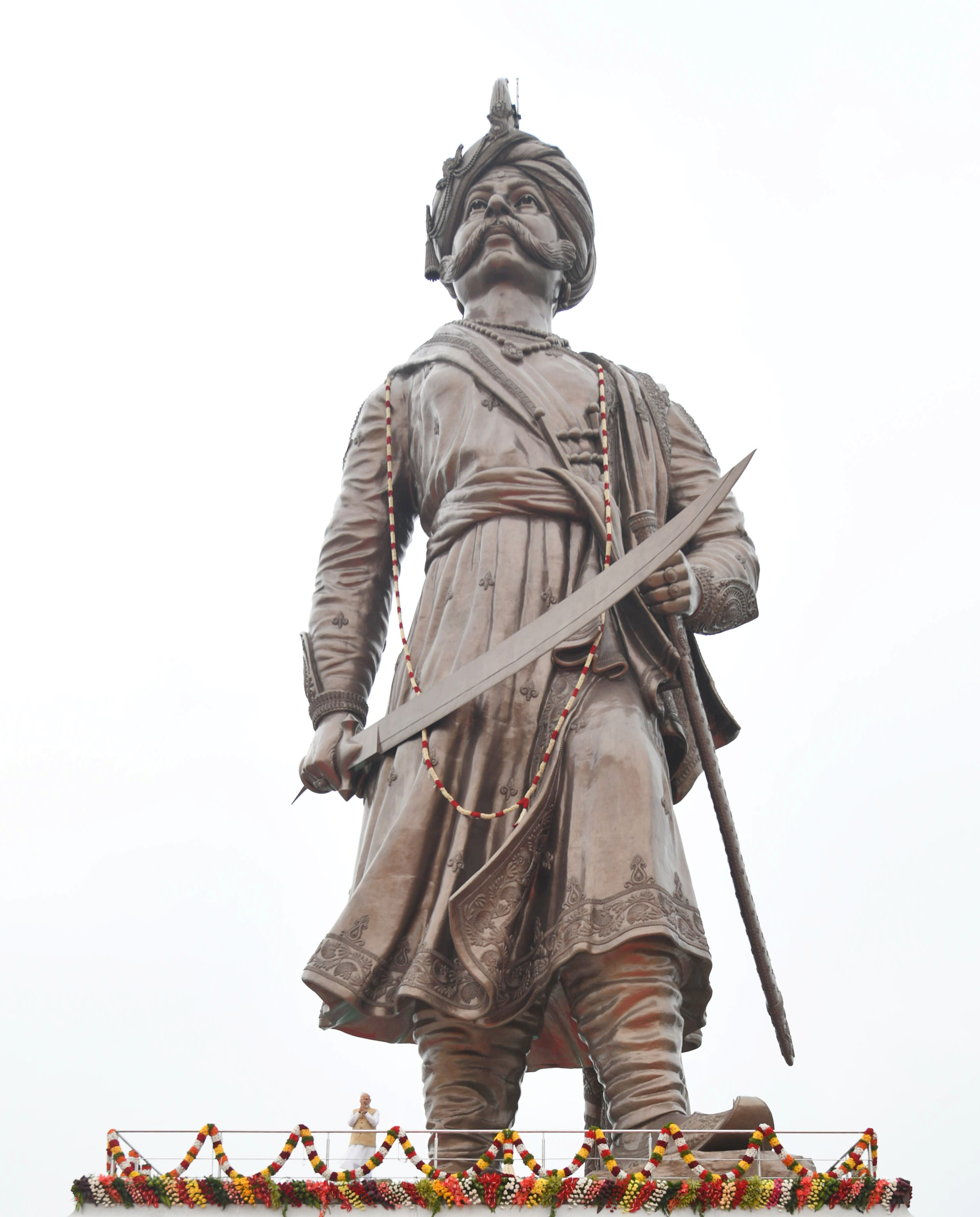
- Interactive map of Statue of Prosperity
- Location: Bangalore International Airport, Devanahalli, Bangalore Rural District, Karnataka, India
- Coordinates: 13.199121°N 77.682248°E
- Builder: Ram V. Sutar
- Type: Statue
- Material: Steel and Bronze, reinforced by concrete and brass coating
- Height: 108 feet (33 m)
- Weight: 218 ton (includes 3.98 ton sword)
- Beginning date: June 2020
- Completion date: August 2022
- Opening date: 11 November 2022
- Dedicated to: Kempe Gowda

The Statue of Prosperity is the statue of the founder and architect of the city of Bangalore, termed widely as 'Nadaprabhu' Kempe Gowda (1510 - 1569), constructed at the Kempegowda International Airport, in Devanahalli of Bengaluru.

It was inaugurated by the Prime Minister of India Narendra Modi, in the presence of Basavaraj Bommai, the then chief minister of the state, and other delegates on the occasion of Kanakadas Jayanti. The statue was recorded in the "World Book of Records" as the tallest bronze statue constructed for a founder of a city. It also stated that it is 108 feet long with the sword weighing 4 tons.

== Description ==
Kempe Gowda is depicted in a standing position holding a sword in his right hand, above a 20 feet high reinforced concrete slabbing. The overall height of the statue is 108 feet, weighing about 218 tonnes, sculpted using majorly steel and bronze which includes 120 tonnes of iron and 98 tonnes of bronze.

It is constructed in a theme park of 23 acres around the area. With an overall construction cost of 84 crores, the statue is a main attraction in the newly launched Terminal 2 (T2) of the Kempegowda International Airport of Bangalore.

== Construction ==
The statue has been installed at the International airport of Bangalore. It is sculpted by the Padma shri awardee Ram.V Sutar who also holds credit for the construction of Statue of Unity in Gujarat and Mahatma Gandhi's statue at Vidhana Soudha of Bangalore. The statue has entered the World Book of Records as the "first and tallest bronze statue of a founder of a city”.

== See also ==
- List of things named after Kempe Gowda I
