= Kempegowda International Airport =

Airport serving Bengaluru, Karnataka, India

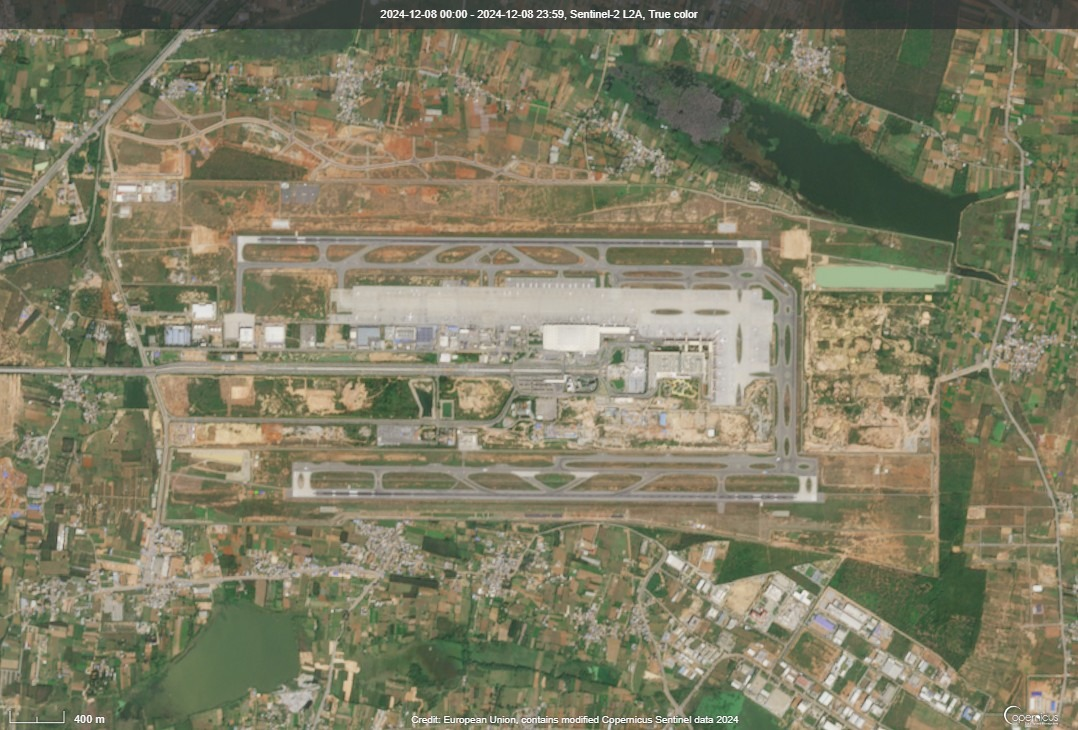
- Satellite image of the airport
- IATA: BLR; ICAO: VOBL

Summary
- Airport type: Public
- Owner/Operator: Bengaluru International Airport Limited (BIAL): Fairfax India Holdings (54%); Siemens Project Ventures GmbH (20%); Airports Authority of India (13%); Karnataka State Industrial and Infrastructure Development Corp. Ltd. (13%)
- Serves: Bengaluru
- Location: Devanahalli, Bengaluru Rural district, Karnataka, India
- Opened: 24 May 2008; 18 years ago
- Hub for: Air India; DHL Aviation
- Operating base for: Air India Express; Akasa Air
- Elevation AMSL: 3,003 ft (915 m)
- Coordinates: 13°11′56″N 077°42′20″E
- Public transit access: Vayu Vajra (Intra-city); Flybus (Inter-city); Kempegowda International Airport Halt; Blue Line KIAL Terminals (Under Construction)
- Website: www.bengaluruairport.com

Map
- Location of airport in Karnataka BLR (India)

Runways
Direction	Length		Surface
Direction	m	ft	Surface
09L/27R	4,000	13,123	Asphalt
09R/27L	4,000	13,123	Asphalt

Statistics (April 2025 - March 2026)
- Passengers: 44,470,035 (▲6.2%)
- International passengers: 7,227,399 (▲23.9%)
- Aircraft movements: 279,971 (▲4.5%)
- Cargo tonnage: 532,012 (▲5.9%)
- Source: AAI

Kempegowda International Airport (IATA: BLR, ICAO: VOBL) is an international airport serving Bengaluru, the capital of the Indian state of Karnataka. Spread over 16 square kilometres (6.2 sq mi), it is located about 35 km (22 mi) north of the city, near the suburb of Devanahalli. It is owned and operated by Bengaluru International Airport Limited (BIAL), a public–private consortium. The airport opened in May 2008, as an alternative to the increasingly congested HAL Airport, the original commercial airport serving the city. It is named after Kempe Gowda I, the founder of Bengaluru. It is Karnataka's first fully solar powered airport, developed by CleanMax Solar.

The airport is the third-busiest in India, behind the airports in Delhi and Mumbai. It is the 26th busiest airport in Asia and the 54th busiest airport in the world as of 2024. In FY2025-26, the airport handled over 44.47 million passengers and 532,012 tonnes (586,443 short tons) of cargo. The airport offers connecting flights to all 6 inhabited continents, and direct flights to 5.

The airport has two passenger terminals that handle both domestic and international operations, and two runways, the second of which was commissioned on 6 December 2019. The second terminal was inaugurated by Prime Minister Narendra Modi on 11 November 2022. There is also a cargo village with 3 cargo terminals.

The airport serves a hub for Air India, Alliance Air, DHL Aviation, FedEx Express and Star Air, as well as an operating base for Air India Express, Akasa Air and IndiGo.

== History ==
=== Planning (1991–2004) ===
The original airport serving Bengaluru was HAL Airport, located 5 kilometres (3.1 mi) from the city centre. It was the primary airport in the city until 2008. Originally established in 1942 for military and defence purposes, HAL began domestic operations for the first time in the late 1970s. The unexpected popularity of newly offered domestic flights encouraged rapid expansion of the airport. In the late 1990s, the first international services began, with Air India flights to Singapore. In 2000, the first foreign carrier, Royal Nepal Airlines, commenced operations with flights to Kathmandu, followed by Lufthansa's A340 service to Germany a year later. Several other major international carriers such as British Airways and Air France started serving the old airport by 2005.

An expansion of the airport's international terminal was impossible, since there was no space in the surrounding environment, and the airport apron could only park six aircraft. In March 1991, former Chairman of the National Airports Authority of India (NAAI), S. Ramanathan, convened a panel to select a site for the new airport. The panel decided on Devanahalli, a village about 30 kilometres (19 mi) north of Bengaluru. The State Government drafted a proposal to build the airport with private assistance, which the Union Government approved in 1994. In 1995, the Airports Authority of India (AAI) and the Government of Karnataka decided to call for international consortia to own, build and operate the new greenfield airport.

In December 1995, a consortium made up of the Tata Group, Raytheon and Singapore Changi Airport signed a memorandum of understanding (MoU) with the State Government regarding participation in the project. In June 1998, however, the consortium announced it was pulling out of the project due to delays in government approval. These included disputes over the location of the new airport and the fate of HAL Airport.

In May 1999, the Airports Authority of India (AAI) and the Karnataka State Industrial and Infrastructure Development Corporation (KSIIDC) signed a memorandum of understanding (MoU) regarding the project. It would be a public–private partnership, with AAI and KSIIDC holding a 26% share and private companies holding the remaining 74%. In January 2001, the State Government created the company Bengaluru International Airport Limited (BIAL) as a special purpose entity, and began searching for partners. By November, the project had attracted Zürich Airport, Siemens Project Ventures and Larsen & Toubro. Construction was expected to begin in October 2002; however, governmental delays persisted. The Union Cabinet approved the project in February 2000. The concession agreement between the State Government, the Union Government and BIAL was signed in July 2004, and it required the closure of HAL Airport.

It took nearly a decade to progress from the initial stages of land allocation and acquisition, to the signing of shareholder agreements in 2002 and the start of construction.

=== Design ===
When the project was initiated, BIAL anticipated traffic of approximately 5 million passengers per annum in the first few years of operations. However, the scale of air traffic growth in the city meant that the figure was already breached by 2008. It took more than 9 months to redesign the project and gain permission for expansion. By the time the approvals for the reworked project were sanctioned, construction was half completed. Despite the challenges, BIAL expected the airport to be operational by the initially proposed date of completion.

The revised increase in capacity catered to 11 million passengers per annum, more than doubling the previous estimates. BIAL's modified plan was to build a terminal with 8 passenger boarding bridges, 1 double arm aerobridge, 9 remote bus gates and a single, 4,000-metre (13,000 ft) long runway. BIAL also planned to build an apron with 42 Code-C aircraft stands (with 8 contact stands), as well as an air and land-side road system. The estimated cost for the entire project at the time was ₹1,930 crore (US$210 million).

=== Construction and opening (2005–2008) ===
Construction commenced on 2 July 2005, and was completed in 32 months. BIAL set the launch date for 30 March 2008. However, due to delays in establishing air traffic control services at the airport, the launch date was pushed to 11 May, and further to 24 May 2008.

Public criticism arose with the opening of the new airport, mainly due to the closure of HAL Airport. In March 2008, AAI employees initiated a massive strike against the closure of HAL Airport in Bengaluru and Begumpet Airport in Hyderabad, fearing they would lose their jobs. The Bangalore City Connect Foundation, a group of citizens and businessmen, staged a rally in mid-May, claiming the new airport was too small for the latest demand projections. On 23 May, a hearing was held at the Karnataka High Court over poor connectivity between the city and the airport. Ultimately, the State Government decided to go ahead with inaugurating the new airport and closing HAL Airport.

The first commercial flight, Air India Flight 609 (AI609) from Mumbai, was allowed to land at 10:40PM on 23 May, the day before the official inauguration, as it would be continuing to Singapore shortly after midnight. The airport became the third greenfield airport to open under a public–private partnership (PPP) model in India, after Cochin International Airport in Kochi and Rajiv Gandhi International Airport in Hyderabad.

=== Renaming and expansion (2009–present) ===
The airport was originally called 'Bengaluru International Airport'. In February 2009, the State Government sent a proposal to the Union Government to rename the airport after the founder of the city, Kempe Gowda I. When no action was taken, the State Government passed a resolution for the name change in December 2011. The Union Government accepted the proposal in 2012, and formally approved it in July 2013. The airport was officially renamed 'Kempegowda International Airport' on 14 December 2013, alongside the inauguration of the expanded terminal building.

Kingfisher Airlines used the airport as a hub, and was one of the largest airlines at the airport. Following its collapse in October 2012, other airlines stepped in to fill the gap in domestic connectivity and establish hubs. Air Pegasus and AirAsia India started using the airport as a hub from 2014.

The first phase of expansion was launched in June 2011 and completed in December 2013. The ₹1,500 crore (US$160 million) project doubled the size of the passenger terminal to 150,556 square metres (1,620,570 sq ft). It included the construction of additional check-in, immigration, security and baggage reclaim facilities. 1 domestic gate and 3 international gates were added to increase capacity. A large, sweeping roof was built to connect the original building with the expansion. The expanded terminal, dubbed "Terminal 1A", raised the capacity of the airport to 25 million passengers per annum.

In October 2019, Ethiopian Airlines began flights to Addis Ababa with Boeing 737 MAXs, marking the first nonstop connection between Bengaluru and Africa. In January 2021, Air India began flights to San Francisco with Boeing 777s, marking the first nonstop connection between Bengaluru and North America. In September 2022, Qantas began flights to Sydney with Airbus A330s, marking the first nonstop connection between Bengaluru and Oceania. The following month, Emirates began serving the airport with its Airbus A380, the world's largest passenger plane, with daily flights to Dubai, marking the airport's first A380 service.

The now-completed second phase of expansion encompassed the construction of a second runway and a second passenger terminal in 2 phases. Since completion, the airport has been able to handle 55-60 million passengers per year. The approximately ₹4,000 crore (US$430 million) project received clearance from India's Ministry of Environment, Forest and Climate Change (MoEFCC) in September 2014.

== Ownership ==
The airport is owned and operated by Bengaluru International Airport Limited (BIAL), a public limited company. The Government of India has granted BIAL the rights to operate the airport for 30 years, with the option to continue for an additional 30 years. The company is a public–private consortium.

Zürich Airport sold its 5% stake in the airport to Fairfax Financial in April 2016 for ₹410 crore (US$44 million).

Indian conglomerate GVK Group initially owned 43% of the shares of Bengaluru Airport, but divested 33% of its stake to Fairfax Financial for ₹2,149 crore (US$230 million) in 2016. GVK closed the deal in March 2017. In January 2018, GVK decided to sell its remaining 10% in shares to Fairfax India Holdings for ₹1,290 crore (US$140 million), and exited BIAL completely.

26% of shares are held by government entities Karnataka State Industrial Investment and Development Corporation (13%) and the Airports Authority of India (13%). 74% is held by private companies Fairfax Financial (54%) and Siemens Project Ventures (20%).

In March 2021, the Airports Authority of India announced their intention to sell their 13% stake in order to raise funds. Between FY22–25, the government aims to raise up to ₹20,782 crore (US$2.2 billion) through aviation. This process will begin with the auction of shares held in Bengaluru Airport, followed by the sales of shares held in the airports of Hyderabad, Mumbai and Delhi.

== Facilities ==
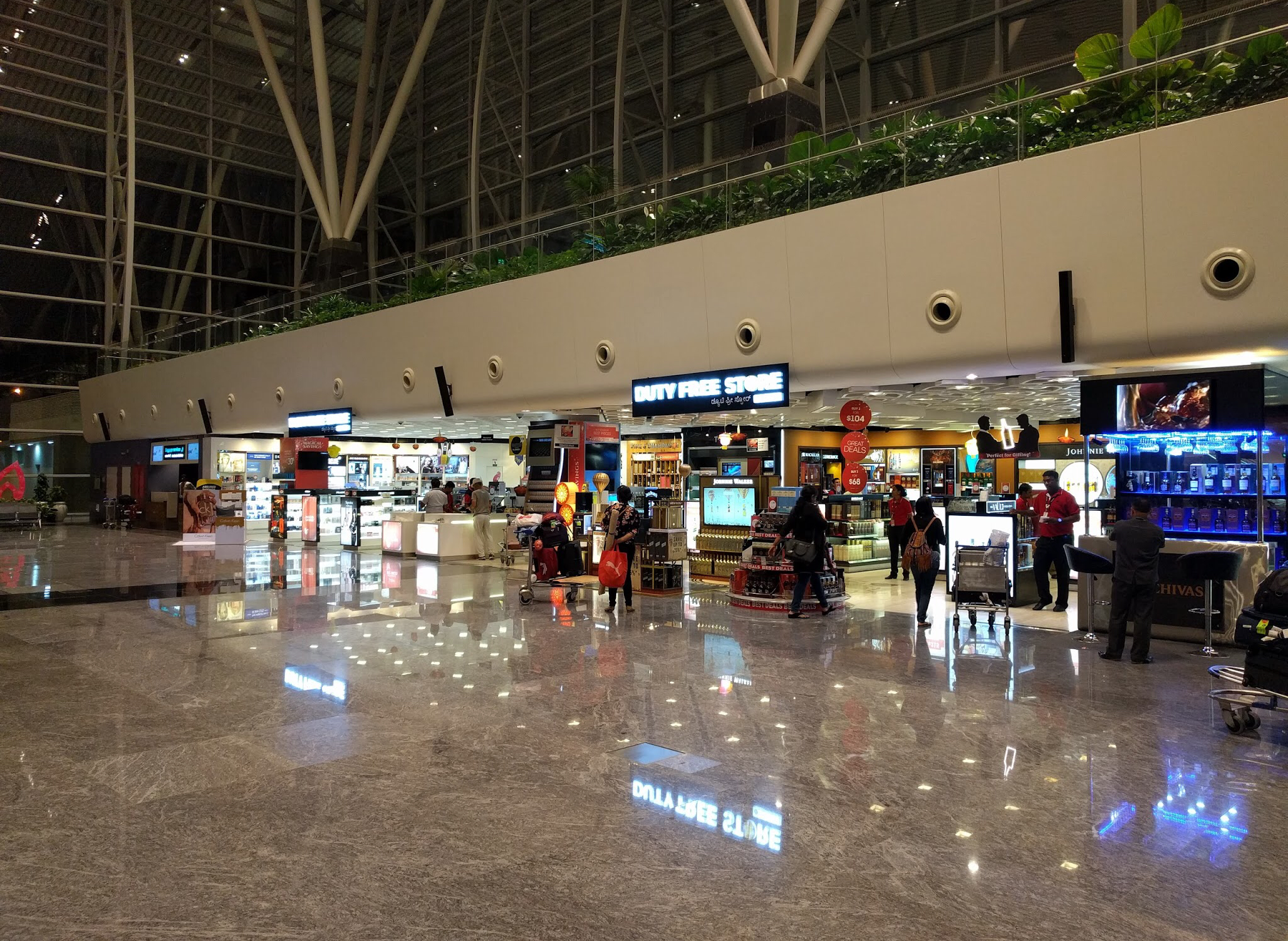
Duty free at the old international arrivals area

=== Runways ===
Kempegowda International Airport has two parallel runways in operation.

Active runways at Kempegowda International Airport
Runway designation	Length	Width	Approach lights/ILS
09L/27R	4,000 metres (13,000 ft)	45 metres (148 ft)	CAT III / CAT III
09R/27L	4,000 metres (13,000 ft)	45 metres (148 ft)	CAT III / CAT III

Four years after it was opened, the first runway (now designated 09L/27R) was entirely resurfaced due to a serious decline in quality. From 11 March to 3 April 2012, it was closed daily between 10:30AM and 5:30PM. BIAL accused construction company Larsen & Toubro of building the runway poorly.

The construction of the second runway (09R/27L) at the airport was completed and the runway inaugurated on 6 December 2019, with the departure of IndiGo Flight 466 (6E466) to Hyderabad. The runway can cater to Code-F aircraft such as the Airbus A380 and Boeing 747-8. It is equipped with CAT IIIB ILS. The runway also features a parallel taxiway and two cross-field taxiways in the east, linking the new runway to the old runway and the aprons at Terminal 1 and Terminal 2. The original runway (09L/27R) was also upgraded as part of the expansion work.

The old runway (09L/27R) was closed from 22 June 2020 for nine months for rehabilitation and strengthening. It was opened for operations again on 31 March 2021, along with the operational south runway. On doing so, KIA became the first airport in South India to facilitate parallel runway operations.

The north runway (09L/27R) is approved for and capable of low-visibility takeoffs, allowing aircraft movement even when the runway visual range (RVR) is as low as 125m. Civil works to also equip this runway with a CAT IIIB ILS system were completed in December 2024. The calibration for the ILS was completed in January 2025 and full CAT IIIB ILS capability was made operational in May 2025. With runway upgrades on the Northern runway completed, both runways and associated taxiways are capable of handling Code-F aircraft such as the Airbus A380 and Boeing 747-8.

From 12:20 pm to 1 pm IST of 20 November 2026, the airport conducted trials of simultaneous departures from its parallel runways while recording around 40 departures and 20 arrivals. The first pair of departures included an IndiGo flight to Mangaluru in the northern runway and an Air India Express flight to Goa in the southern one. DGCA approved the airport for simultaneous approach and departures on 3 November and the operational procedure could be formally launched on 27 November. This could increase the airport's operational capacity from 60 aircraft movements per hour (30 departuers and 30 arrivals) to 85 movements.

=== Terminals ===
==== Terminal 1 ====
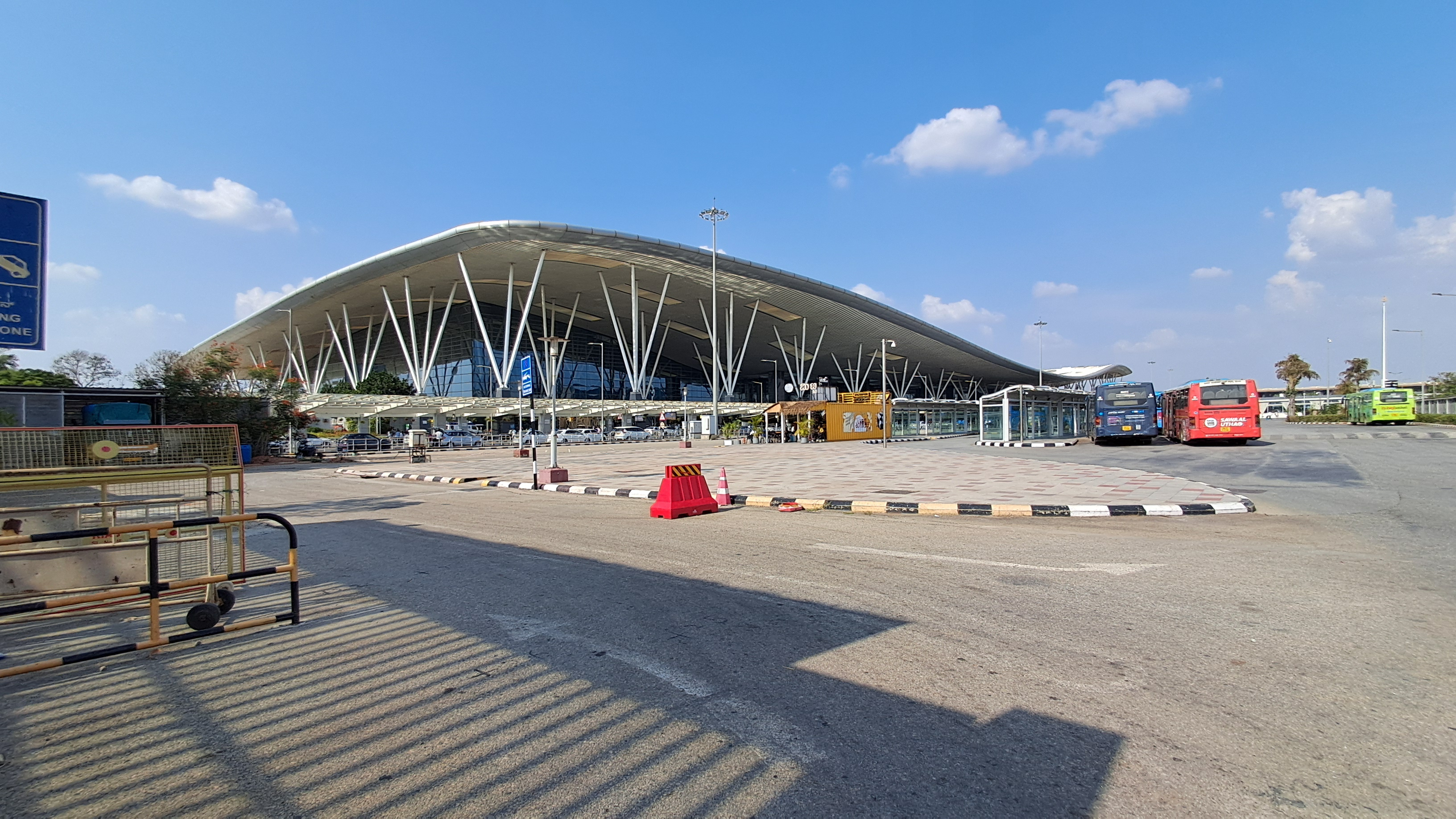
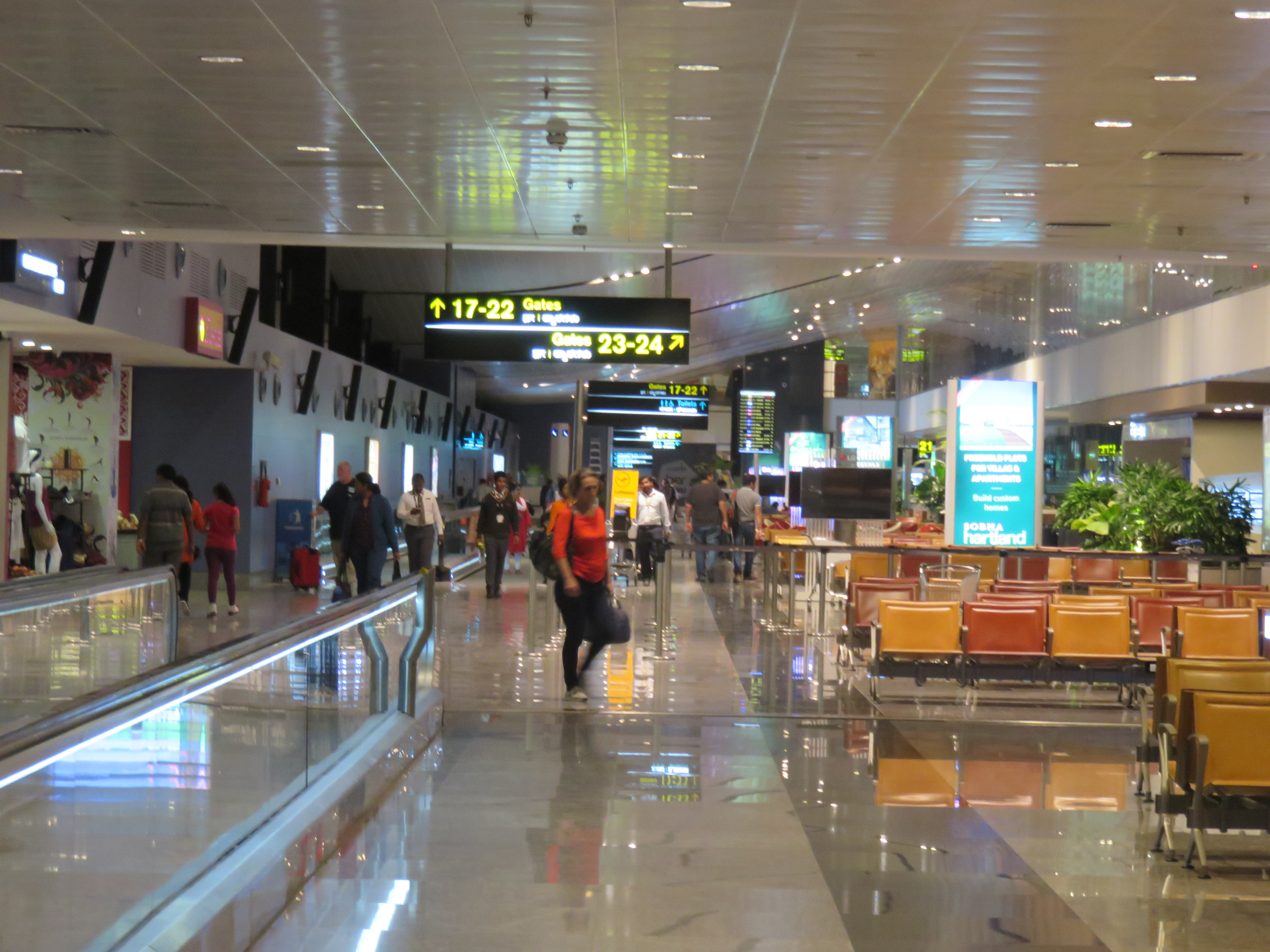
(Left): Front view of Terminal 1; (Right): Erstwhile international departures section at Terminal 1

The original terminal building can handle 35 million passengers per annum, and handles all domestic flights operated by IndiGo, Akasa Air, Alliance Air and SpiceJet. Check-in and baggage reclaim is situated on the lower floor, while departure gates are located on the lower & upper floors. Boarding gates 1&2, 12–18 and 28–43 on the upper floor are equipped with jet bridges. Boarding gates 3–9 and 19–25 on the lower floor form the Western and Eastern bus gates respectively. Gates 41–42 are equipped to serve the world's largest passenger aircraft, the Airbus A380.

Since 12 September 2023, with the shift of all international flights to Terminal 2, Terminal 1 has become a domestic-only operation.

In 2019, BIAL retracted the rights of Above Ground Level and Plaza Premium to operate the lounges in Terminal 1, and decided to operate them by themselves. Following this decision, and the transfer of international flights, there are now only two lounges in Terminal 1: the BLR Domestic Lounge and the new 080 Domestic Lounge (which is split into 2 disconnected lounges, as 1 used to serve the erstwhile international departures). Named "080" after the trunk dial code of the city, the new lounge aims to pay an ode to the culture of Bengaluru with local artistry, regional culture-inspired interiors and botanical elements. Both lounges are operated by Travel Food Services on behalf of the airport.

==== Terminal 2 ====
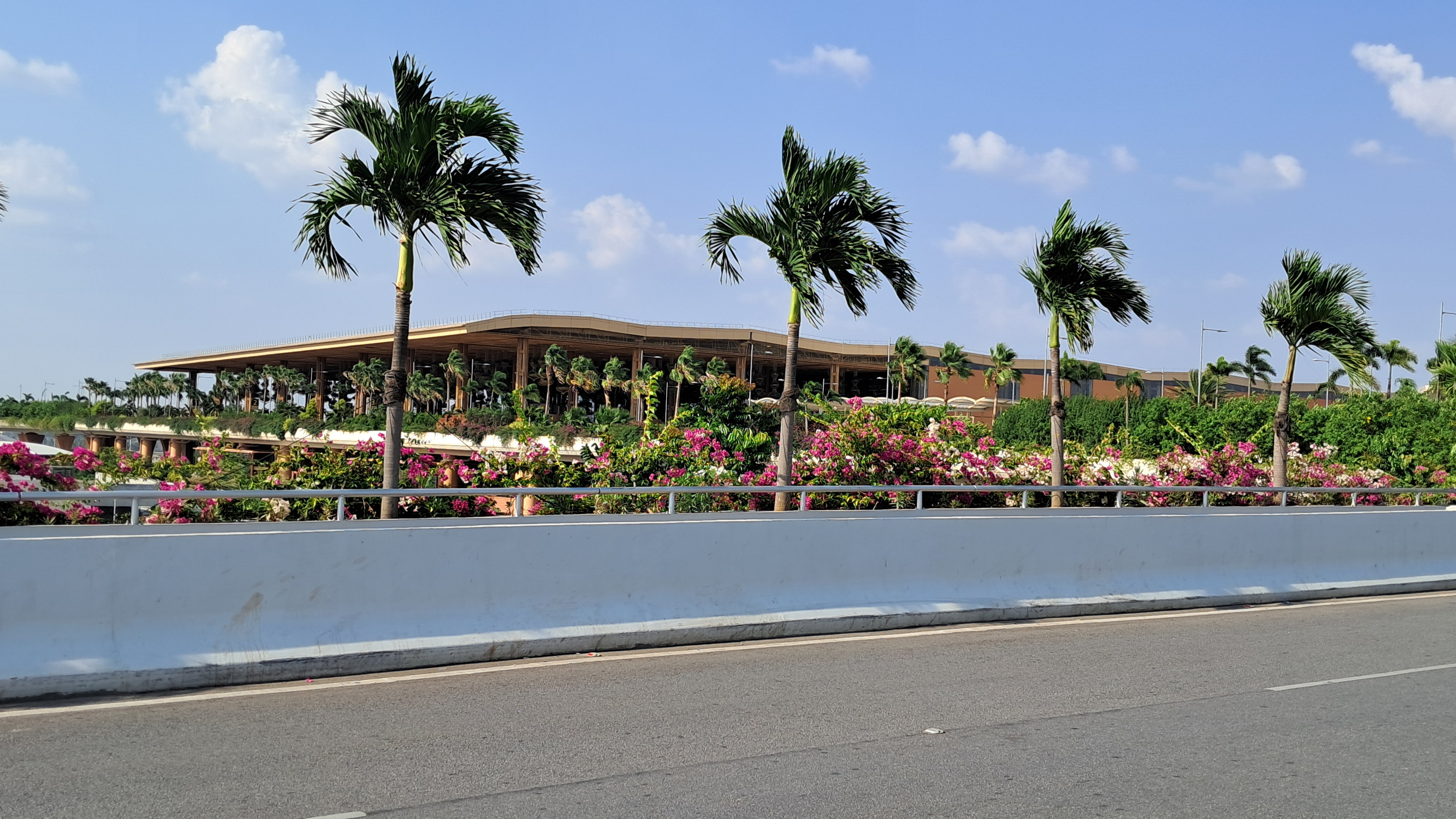
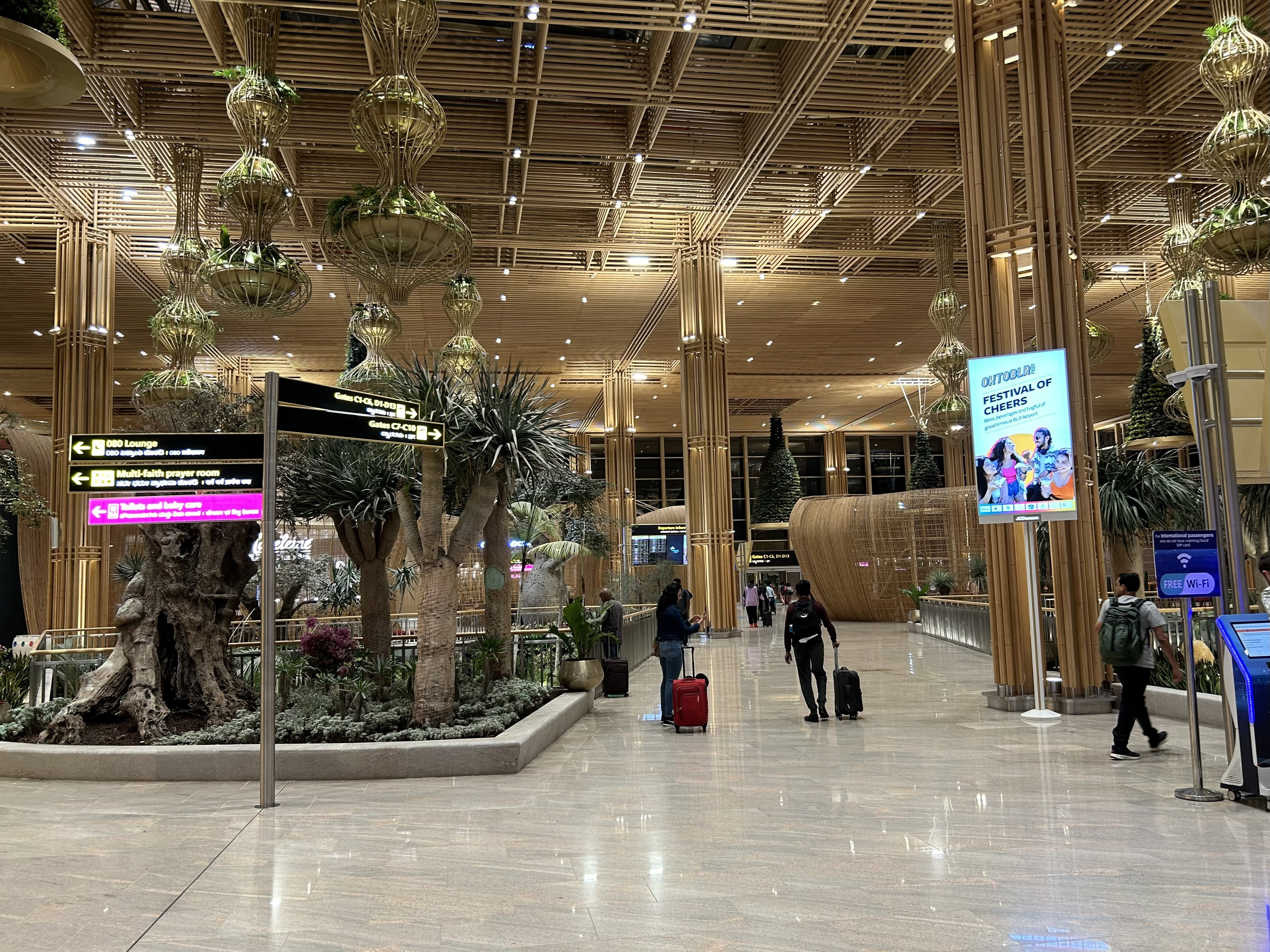
(Left): Front view of Terminal 2; (Right): International departures area at Terminal 2

The airport's second terminal was designed as a tribute to the 'Garden City' title of Bengaluru by Skidmore, Owings & Merrill, and was constructed by Larsen & Toubro. Construction of the first phase commenced in 2018, but the project faced delays owing to the COVID-19 pandemic. It was inaugurated on 11 November 2022 by Prime Minister of India Narendra Modi, and began operations in January 2023. The first phase of Terminal 2, built at a cost of ₹5,000 crore (US$530 million), is 255,000 square metres (2,740,000 sq ft) and will help augment the capacity of the airport by an additional 25 million passengers per annum. The second phase of Terminal 2 is under construction to increase capacity by an additional 20 million passengers per annum.

Arrivals are situated on the ground floor, while departures are on the first floor. The first phase of Terminal 2 features 95 check-in counters, 17 security lanes, 9 baggage claim belts, 34 conventional and 6 electronic immigration gates. With provisions for Code-F gates to handle larger aircraft like the Airbus A380 and the Boeing 747-8, the first phase of Terminal 2 began domestic operations on 15 January 2023, with Star Air Flight 117 (S5117) to Kalaburagi being the first scheduled flight to use the new terminal. On 12 September 2023, Terminal 2 began handling all international operations, with Saudia Flight 867 (SV867) from Jeddah operating the first international arrival and subsequent departure. In addition to handling all international operations, Terminal 2 also handles all domestic flights operated by Air India, Air India Express and Star Air.

=== Aviation fuel services ===
The airport has a fuel farm spread over 11 acres (4.5 ha), west of the cargo village and passenger terminal. It was built by Indian Oil Skytanking Ltd (IOSL), but is shared by multiple oil companies. In October 2008, IndianOil commissioned a 36-kilometre (22 mi) fuel pipeline between its storage terminal in Devanagonthi and Kempegowda International Airport.

=== Cargo facilities ===
The airport has 3 cargo terminals. One is operated by AISATS Ltd. (Air India Singapore Airport Terminal Services Limited) and includes a facility for storing pharmaceuticals. DHL and Blue Dart Aviation jointly operate a 20,500-square-metre (221,000 ft^{2}) terminal.

The third cargo terminal is operated by Menzies Aviation Bobba (Bangalore) Pvt. Ltd, a joint venture between Menzies Aviation and Bobba Group (a sales agency for Lufthansa Cargo). The 16,000-square-metre (170,000 ft^{2}) cargo terminal began operations in May 2008. Additionally, a greenfield domestic cargo terminal spanning 28,300-square-metre (305,000 ft^{2}) opened in February 2025. Combined, the terminal has the capacity to handle 680,000 tonnes (750,000 short tons) tons of cargo annually.

Altogether, the airport has the capacity to process up to 1,400,000 tonnes (1,500,000 short tons) of cargo annually and currently sees ~450,000 tonnes (500,000 short tons) handled per year. The airport processes the highest amount of perishable cargo in the country.

BIAL inaugurated a separate cargo village in December 2008. The village is spread over 11 acres (4.5 ha) and includes office spaces, conference rooms, a cafeteria for staff and parking space for nearly 80 trucks.

=== Other facilities ===
==== IndiGo iFly Training Academy ====
On 4 September 2019, India's biggest airline IndiGo announced that it would extend its learning academy, iFly, to Bengaluru, its 2nd such facility in the country. From 6 September 2019 onwards, iFly began facilitating training to IndiGo flight crew. With over 27,000 employees, there are over 100 instructors in the academy who conduct workshops and training exercises on a regular basis.

==== Maintenance, Repair and Overhaul Facilities ====
IndiGo's second MRO facility to service their fleet of Airbus jets is located at KIA. The 20,300-square-metre (218,000 ft^{2}) facility has capacity for narrow-body aircraft and houses a single bay catering for widebody aircraft. The MRO became operational in November 2022. As of May 2025, IndiGo is currently in the process of constructing a second MRO of roughly 130,000-square-metre (1,400,000 ft^{2}) at the airport, in order to service wide-body aircraft.

Aligning with their vision to establish a hub at the airport, Air India signed a memorandum of understanding (MoU) in February 2024 to build Maintenance, Repair, and Overhaul (MRO) facilities at Kempegowda International Airport, for airframe maintenance of both wide-body and narrow-body jets, including heavy structural checks. The MRO will be built on a 141,600-square-metre (1,524,000 ft^{2}) parcel of land, and is expected to be operational by early 2026.

==== Central Kitchen ====
Food services provider SATS set up their first central kitchen in India at the airport on 16 March 2024. A 14,000-square-metre (150,690 ft^{2}) facility, it was built with an investment of ₹210 crore (US$22 million), to cater to demand in the region. SATS already has a long-standing partnership with the airport, through its aviation catering associate TajSATS and ground handling associate AISATS.

== Future plans ==
As part of the airport's masterplan, the completion of Terminal 2's Phase 2 will add an additional capacity of 20 million passengers per annum. There are also plans to build an APM (Automated People Mover) system that will seamlessly connect passengers between all terminals.

The final phase of the master plan involves identifying a location for Terminal 3, though this is only expected in the late 2020s or early 2030s depending on passenger traffic. With Terminal 3, the airport is eyeing a capacity of 90-100 million passengers per annum. In the interim, several infrastructure projects such as the construction of the Airport's Metro & Suburban Rail stations, as well as the Airport City, are planned.

As of August 2025, the airport's new Western cross-field taxiway is under construction, with civil works set to complete by H12026. Approximately 0.87-mile (1.4 km) in length, the 2 parallel taxiways will link the airport's 2 runways on the Western side of the airfield and will be able to accommodate Code-F aircraft. The taxiway will cross the main access road, the North cargo road and the upcoming Airport line.

== Airlines and destinations ==
=== Passenger ===
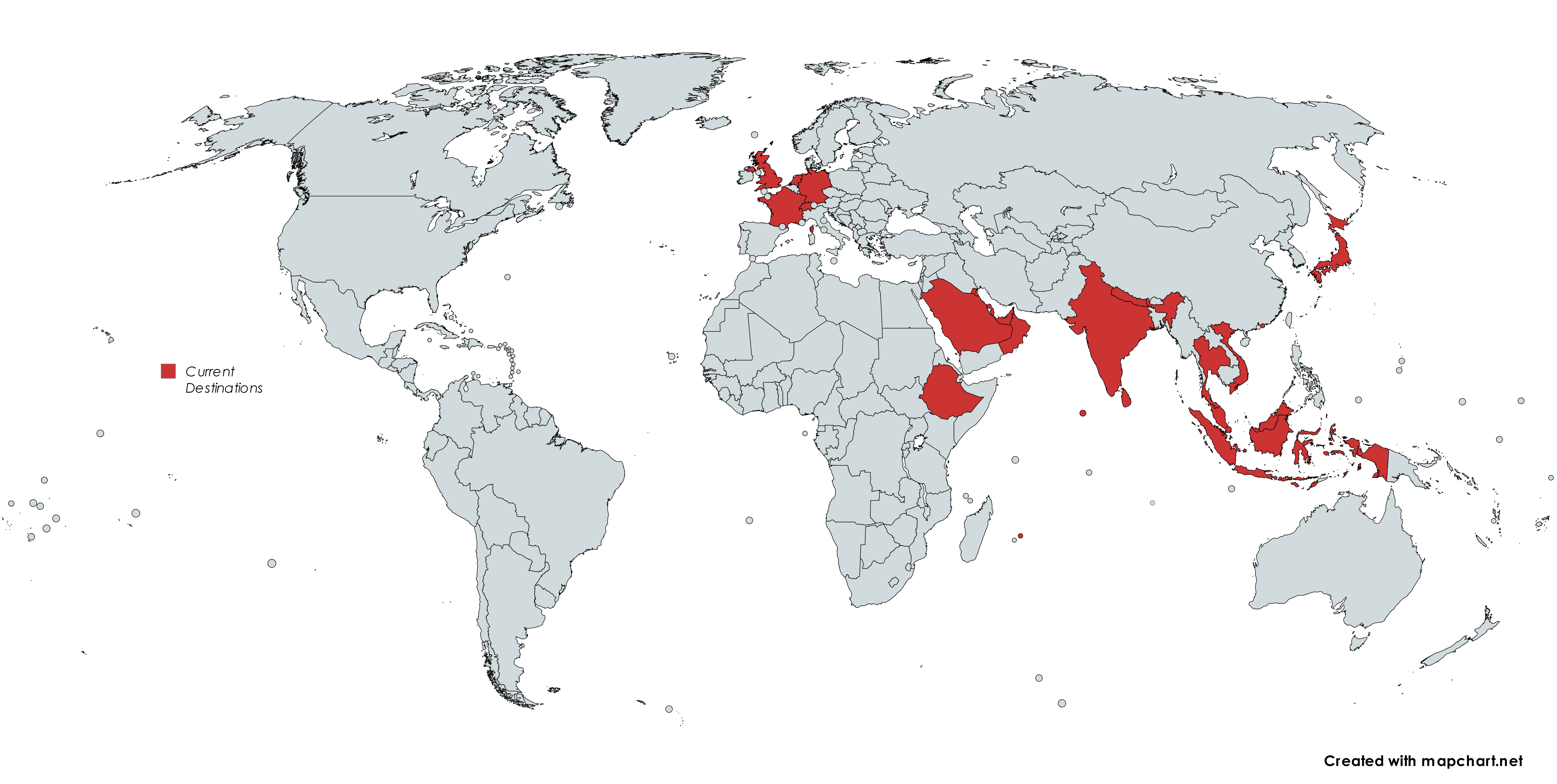
Kempegowda International Airport passenger destinations

Airlines	Destinations
Air Arabia	Sharjah
Air France	Paris–Charles de Gaulle
Air India	Delhi, London–Heathrow, Mumbai
Air India Express	Abu Dhabi, Ahmedabad, Bangkok–Suvarnabhumi, Bhubaneswar, Chandigarh, Chennai, Coimbatore, Dammam, Dehradun, Delhi, Doha, Dubai–International, Goa–Dabolim, Goa–Mopa, Guwahati, Gwalior, Hyderabad, Indore, Jaipur, Jeddah, Jodhpur, Kannur, Kathmandu, Kochi, Kolkata, Kozhikode, Kuwait City, Lucknow, Madurai, Mangaluru, Nagpur, Navi Mumbai, Patna, Phuket, Port Blair, Pune, Ranchi, Riyadh, Siliguri, Srinagar, Surat, Thiruvananthapuram, Tiruchirappalli, Varanasi, Vijayawada, Visakhapatnam
AirAsia	Kuala Lumpur–International
Akasa Air	Abu Dhabi, Agartala, Ahmedabad, Bhubaneswar, Chandigarh, Chennai, Darbhanga, Delhi, Gorakhpur, Guwahati, Jaipur, Jeddah, Kolkata, Kozhikode, Lucknow, Mumbai, Phuket, Pune, Siliguri, Udaipur, Varanasi
Alliance Air	Hyderabad
Batik Air Malaysia	Kuala Lumpur–International
British Airways	London–Heathrow
Cathay Pacific	Hong Kong
Emirates	Dubai–International
Ethiopian Airlines	Addis Ababa
Etihad Airways	Abu Dhabi
Fly91	Agatti, Hubli, Sindhudurg, Tirupati
Gulf Air	Bahrain
IndiGo	Abu Dhabi, Agartala, Agatti, Agra, Ahmedabad, Amritsar, Aurangabad, Bangkok–Suvarnabhumi, Bareilly, Belgaum, Bhopal, Bhubaneswar, Chandigarh, Chennai, Coimbatore, Colombo–Bandaranaike, Darbhanga (begins 20 December 2026), Dehradun, Delhi, Denpasar, Deoghar, Doha, Dubai–International, Durgapur, Ghaziabad, Goa–Dabolim, Goa–Mopa, Gorakhpur, Guwahati, Hanoi (begins 20 December 2026), Hubli, Hyderabad, Indore, Jabalpur, Jaipur, Jeddah, Jharsuguda, Jodhpur, Kannur, Kanpur, Kochi, Kolhapur, Kolkata, Kozhikode, Kuala Lumpur–International, Kurnool, Langkawi, Lucknow, Madurai, Malé, Mangaluru, Mauritius, Mumbai, Nagpur, Nashik, Navi Mumbai, Noida, Patna, Phuket, Pondicherry, Port Blair, Prayagraj, Pune, Raipur, Rajamahendravaram, Rajkot, Ranchi, Shirdi, Shimoga (ends 21 November 2026), Siliguri, Singapore, Surat, Thiruvananthapuram, Tiruchirappalli, Tirupati, Tuticorin, Udaipur, Vadodara, Varanasi, Vijayawada, Visakhapatnam
Japan Airlines	Tokyo–Narita
Jazeera Airways	Kuwait City
KLM	Amsterdam
Kuwait Airways	Kuwait City
Lufthansa	Frankfurt, Munich
Malaysia Airlines	Kuala Lumpur–International
Nepal Airlines	Kathmandu
Oman Air	Muscat
Qantas	Sydney–Kingsford Smith
Qatar Airways	Doha
SalamAir	Muscat
Saudia	Jeddah
Singapore Airlines	Singapore
SpiceJet	Ahmedabad, Bagdogra, Delhi, Kolkata, Mumbai, Patna
SriLankan Airlines	Colombo–Bandaranaike
Star Air	Bidar, Goa–Mopa, Hyderabad, Kalaburagi, Nanded, Vidyanagar
Swiss International Air Lines	Zürich
Thai AirAsia	Bangkok–Don Mueang
Thai Airways International	Bangkok–Suvarnabhumi
Thai Lion Air	Bangkok–Don Mueang
VietJet Air	Ho Chi Minh City
Vietnam Airlines	Hanoi
Virgin Atlantic	London–Heathrow

=== Cargo ===
Airlines	Destinations
AeroLogic	Bangkok–Suvarnabhumi, Frankfurt,
Amazon Air	Coimbatore, Delhi, Hyderabad, Mumbai
Blue Dart Aviation	Ahmedabad, Chennai, Delhi, Hyderabad, Kolkata, Mumbai
Cathay Cargo	Hong Kong
Challenge Airlines	Dubai–Al Maktoum, Tel Aviv
Emirates SkyCargo	Dubai–Al Maktoum
Ethiopian Airlines Cargo	Addis Ababa,
Etihad Cargo	Abu Dhabi
FedEx Express	Cologne/Bonn, Dubai–International, Guangzhou, Liège, Paris–Charles de Gaulle
MASkargo	Kuala Lumpur–International
Oman Air Cargo	Muscat
Qatar Airways Cargo	Doha
Quikjet Cargo	Delhi, Hyderabad
Sichuan Airlines Cargo	Chengdu–Shuangliu, Chongqing
Singapore Airlines Cargo	Amsterdam, Sharjah, Singapore
SF Airlines	Ezhou, Shenzhen
Turkish Airlines Cargo	Colombo–Bandaranaike, Dammam, Istanbul
UPS Airlines	Cologne/Bonn, Shenzhen

== Statistics ==
Busiest domestic routes from BLR (2024–25)
Rank	Airport	Carriers	Passengers
1	Delhi	Air India, Air India Express, Akasa Air, IndiGo, SpiceJet	4,681,042
2	Mumbai, Maharashtra	Air India, Akasa Air, IndiGo	4,114,574
3	Kolkata, West Bengal	Air India Express, Akasa Air, IndiGo	2,326,777
4	Hyderabad, Telangana	Air India, Air India Express, Akasa Air, Alliance Air, IndiGo, Star Air	2,293,602
5	Pune, Maharashtra	Air India Express, Akasa Air, IndiGo	1,881,109
6	Kochi, Kerala	Air India Express, Alliance Air, IndiGo	1,482,441
7	Chennai, Tamil Nadu	Air India, Air India Express, IndiGo	1,474,948
8	Goa–Dabolim, Goa	Air India Express, IndiGo	1,163,301
9	Ahmedabad, Gujarat	Air India, Akasa Air, IndiGo	980,653
10	Varanasi, Uttar Pradesh	Air India Express, Akasa Air, IndiGo	882,200

Busiest international routes from BLR (2025–26)
Rank	Airport	Carriers	Passengers
1	Dubai, United Arab Emirates	Air India Express, Emirates, IndiGo	873,545
2	Abu Dhabi, United Arab Emirates	Air India Express, Akasa Air, Etihad Airways, IndiGo	653,230
3	Singapore	IndiGo, Singapore Airlines	573,298
4	London–Heathrow, United Kingdom	Air India, British Airways, Virgin Atlantic	471,747
5	Kuala Lumpur, Malaysia	AirAsia, Batik Air Malaysia, IndiGo, Malaysia Airlines	389,709
6	Bangkok–Suvarnabhumi, Thailand	Air India Express, IndiGo, Thai Airways International	350,013
7	Doha, Qatar	Air India Express, IndiGo, Qatar Airways	322,208
8	Colombo–Bandaranaike, Sri Lanka	IndiGo, SriLankan Airlines	321,835
9	Frankfurt, Germany	Lufthansa	228,866
10	Paris–Charles de Gaulle, France	Air France	218,568

== Ground transport ==
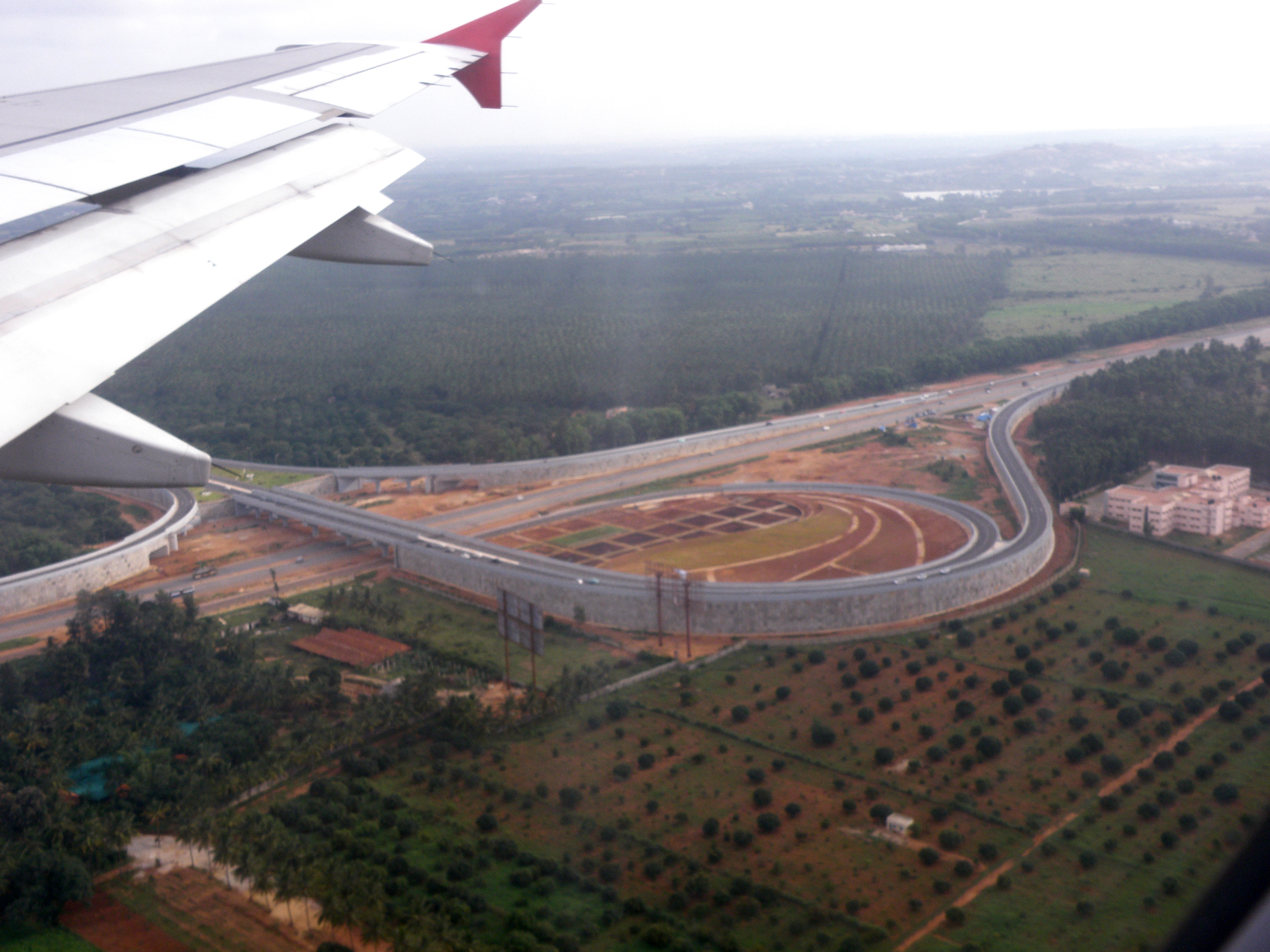
The trumpet interchange between NH44 and the road leading to the airport.

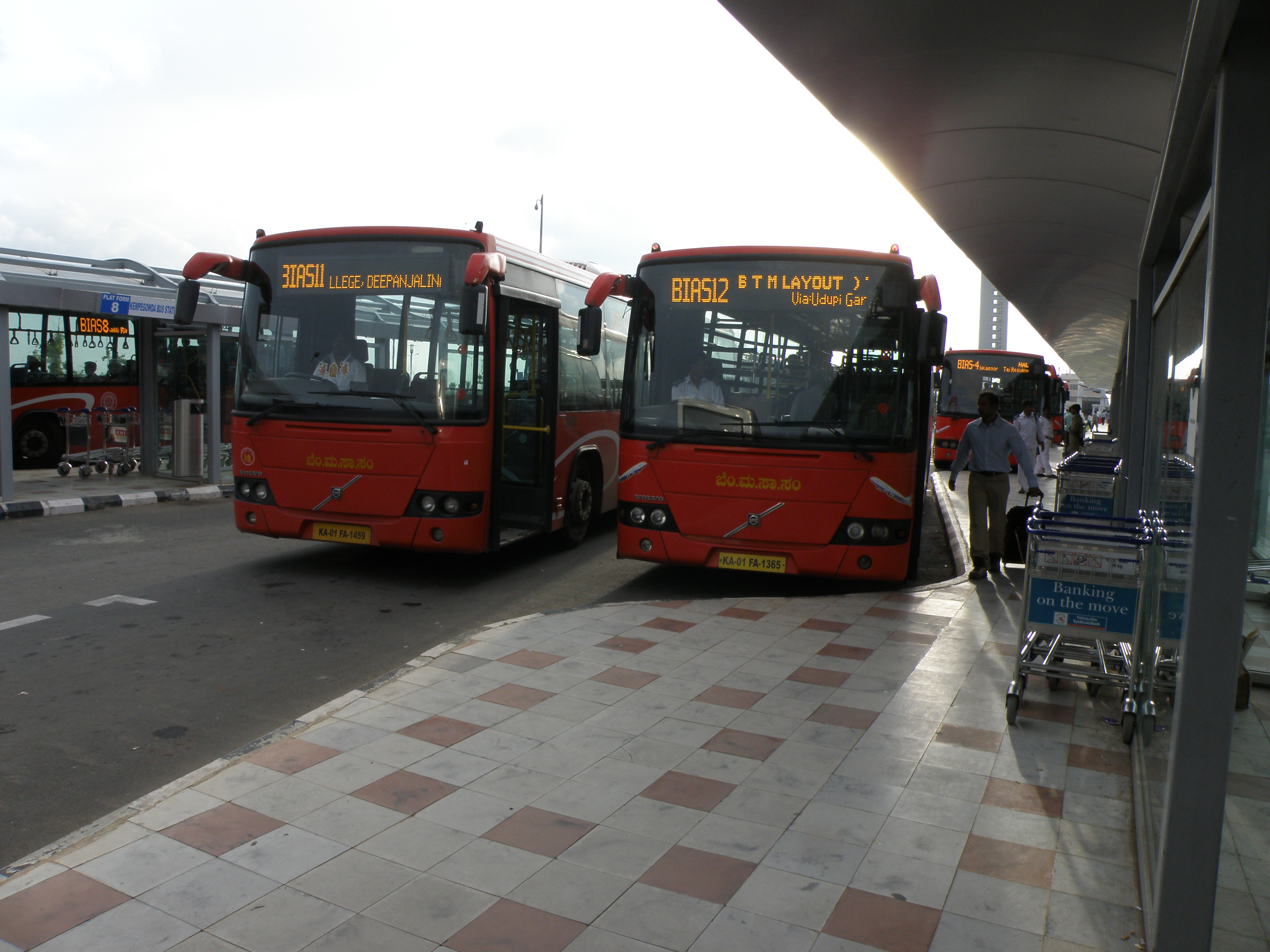
BMTC's erstwhile Volvo buses that served the Vayu Vajra routes.

=== Road ===
,

Kempegowda International Airport is connected to Bengaluru by National Highway 44 (NH44). In January 2014, a six-lane flyover above NH44 was completed to connect Hebbal and the airport, helping to reduce travel time to and from the city. Two alternative routes run through Thanisandra and Budigere. The airport has 4 parking lots located at ground level. Alongside BIAL's own taxi service, ride-sharing companies Ola and Uber have dedicated 'taxi zones' outside both terminals.

The Bengaluru Metropolitan Transport Corporation (BMTC) has a dedicated pick-up zone outside both terminals and provides bus transportation to all parts of the city through the Vayu Vajra (Kannada for "Diamond in the Air") service. The service connects the airport to major city hubs including Majestic, Electronic City, Whitefield, Indiranagar, MG Road, and Hebbal, among others, with routes operating 24×7. It is operated using a fleet of Switch EiV12 buses.

Additionally, the Karnataka State Road Transport Corporation (KSRTC) operates a nonstop bus service called Flybus between Kempegowda International Airport and Mysore, as well as a route to Manipal via Mangaluru.

Upcoming projects include the construction of an Eastern Tunnel Access Road which will decongest the route taken by passengers arriving from Whitefield, thus reducing travel times by 30%. It is expected to cost ₹200 crore (US$21 million) and finish construction by 2027. BIAL is also considering the construction of access roads that link the airport to the new Satellite Town Ring Road.

=== Rail ===
A halt at the KIA boundary commenced operations in January 2021. The train halt is connected to the airport terminal via 5-minute shuttle buses. 5 trains from the city operate daily to Devanahalli station at the KIA halt. Future plans include turning Devanahalli station into a mega rail terminal to decongest the city's railway stations and serve as the hub for the 178-mile (287 km) circular rail network and high-speed rail (HSR) lines.

The Airport and Airport City will also be connected to the city by the Sampige line of the under-construction Bengaluru Suburban Rail Project (BSRP). It is expected to be operational by December 2027.

The plan to build a metro link between Bengaluru and its airport was revived in 2020, and is now under construction as part of the Blue Line. The project will link Bengaluru with the airport under Phase 2 of the Namma Metro project, and is 36-mile (58 km) long. The line connects with the Red & Orange Lines at Hebbal, the Pink Line at Nagawara, the Purple Line at K.R. Puram and the Yellow Line at Central Silk Board, thus serving the entire city. The project is expected to open in 3 phases between June and December 2026.

There are 2 metro stations being built in the airport campus; 1 to serve the upcoming Airport City and the other one in the Multi Modal Transport Hub opposite Terminal 2. The cost of building these 2 stations is estimated to be ₹800 crore (US$85 million).

=== Air ===
Bengaluru-based startup Sarla Aviation has signed a memorandum of understanding (MoU) with BIAL to establish 'air taxi' operations between Electronic City in Bengaluru South and the airport using eVTOL aircraft. Tickets are expected to cost ₹1,700 (US$18) and the service is expected to cover the 32-mile (52 km) stretch in just 19 minutes.

== See also ==
- List of airports in India
- List of airports in Karnataka
- List of busiest airports in India
- List of things named after Kempe Gowda I
