= Kempegowda Museum =

Kempegowda Museum, Bangalore
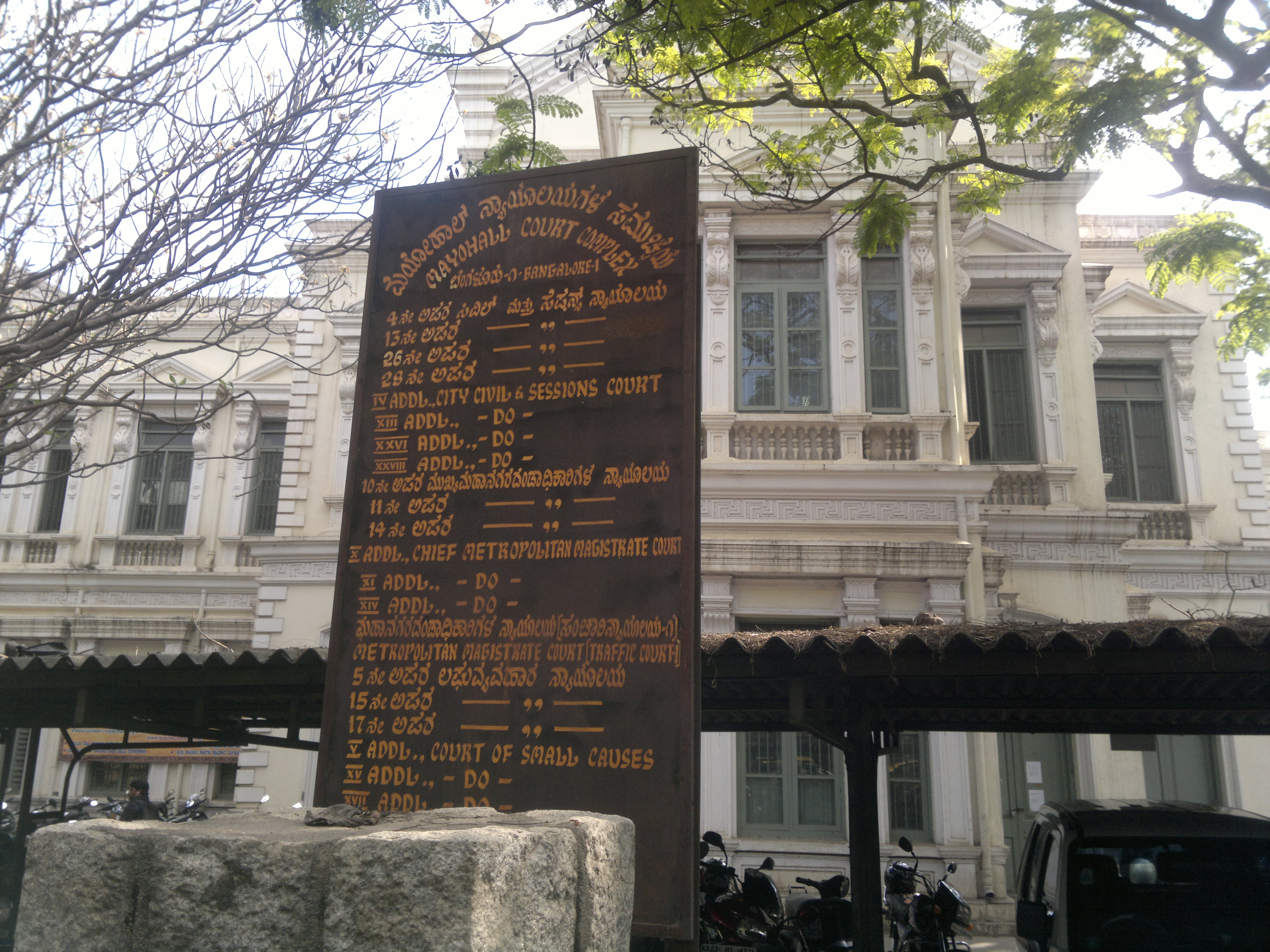

- Location in the Map of Bangalore
- Established: 7 April 2011
- Location: MG road, Bangalore
- Coordinates: 12.974092°N 77.610754°E
- Type: Heritage center
- Curator: Prof. Devarakonda Reddy
- Owner: Government of Karnataka
- Public transit access: Metro: M.G. Road & Trinity stations; Bus: Mayo Hall Bus Stop
- Parking: Utility building (next door)

Kempegowda Museum is a government museum located in the city of Bangalore, in the state of Karnataka, India. It was established in the year 2011 is dedicated to Yelahanka chieftain Kempegowda (1513-1569) who was the founder of Bangalore city. The museum is located on the first floor of Mayo Hall. The museum has Kempegowda's statue as well as posters and pictures of forts, temples, reservoirs and inscriptions from his time.

== History ==
Kempegowda was the founder of Bangalore city. He was honored with the title of Chikkaraya by Vijayanagar emperor Sri Krishnadevaraya of the Vijayanagara dynasty. Kempegowda built four towers that marked the limits of erstwhile Bangalore town. These four towers are located in following areas of today's Bangalore: near Mekhri circle, inside Lalbagh park, near Kempambudhi Lake and the last one near Ulsoor Lake. Many of the city's current lakes and markets and the Bull temple date back to Kempegowda's time.

The move to set up the museum to honor the city's founder was first proposed in 2000 though there was no progress for many years. The execution of museum idea only started when the Samithis (committees) for Kempegowda Smaraka Vastu Sanghrahalaya (Kempegowda memorial museum) and Adyayana Kendra (Learning Center) were founded in the year 2005. The museum was finally opened on 7 April 2011. The museum was inaugurated by Chief Minister B.S. Yeddyurappa.

== Building ==
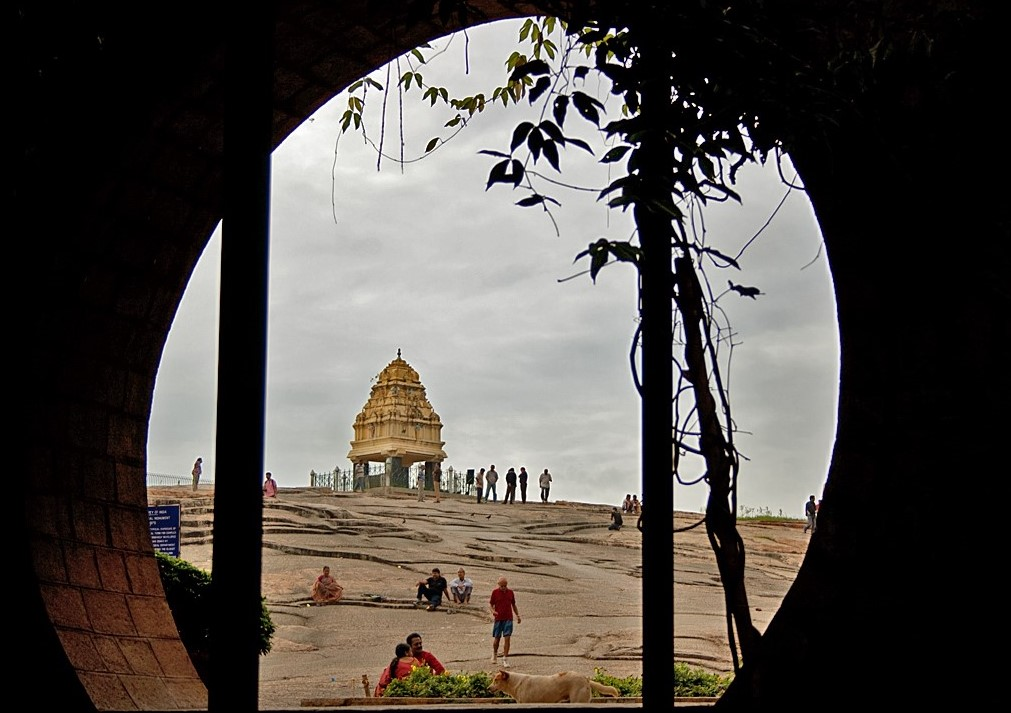
One of the four Kempegowda built towers which signified the town limits of early Bangalore is located in Lalbagh.

The Kempe Gowda Museum is housed is the first floor of the heritage building of Mayo Hall. The building has been painted in the Cantonment colors of red and white. Mayo Hall's upper storey was earlier reserved for public meetings free of charge while the ground floor housed the municipal offices. Until the year 2010, the Mayor of Bangalore's meetings were held on the first floor. The adjoining blocks of the building which were built in 1904, now house a variety of courts and public offices were previously referred to as 'station public offices'. When a visitor enters the building, they can view the floor plan of the museum's first floor gallery. The impressive wooden stairs that lead to museum have old paintings of Bangalore and its nearby forts, made by British surveyors.

== Museum design ==
A framed map of 18th century Bangalore forms the entire base of the main hall with the four corners of the room having tower shaped panels to symbolise the four watch towers (fixed boundaries) of earlier town. The panels in the four corners display information about the locations of Kempegowda's towers in the current city. There are display panels located on the walls in between the towers showcase information with photographs and illustrations.

The museum concept was planned and implemented by Design Core, a design firm. The chief designer of the museum is K.N. Suryaprakash. Historian and folklorist and H.K. Rajegowda wrote the text that accompanies the pictures on display in the museum.

== Collections ==
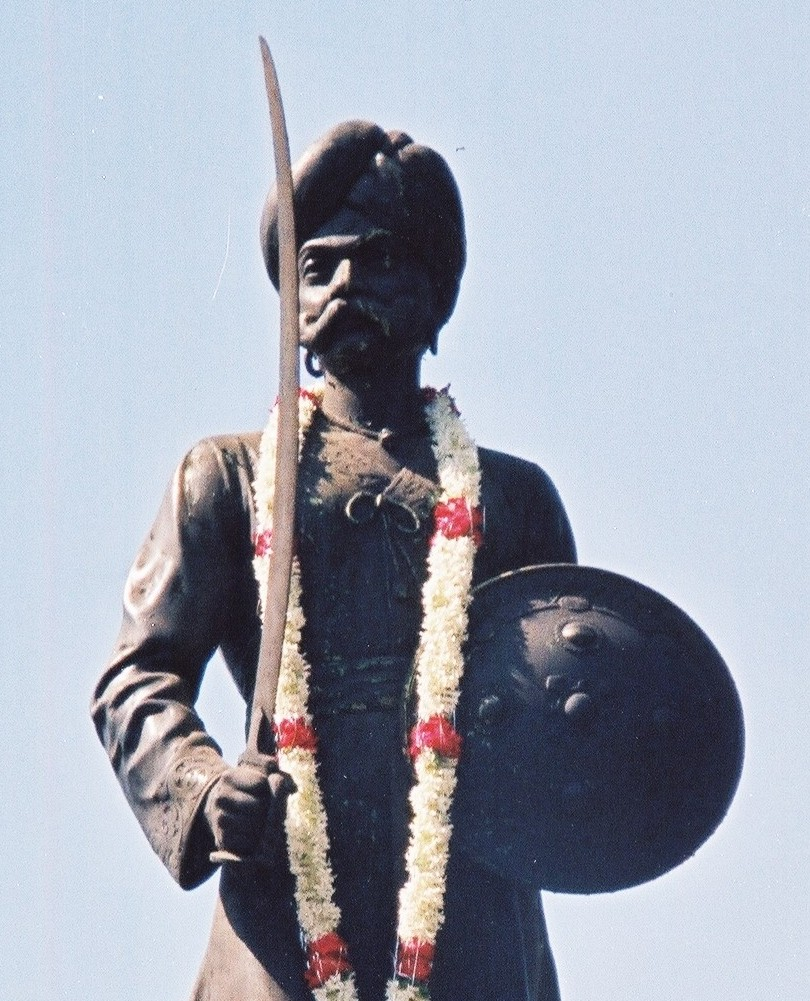
The Museum is dedicated to the Yelahanka chieftain Kempegowda(1513-1569) who is the founder of Bangalore city.

=== Heritage Bangalore map ===
Visitors to the museum will actually be walking on a magnified heritage map of 19th century Bangalore. The map is spread across the wooden floor and laminated with a glass slab. The map has been procured from the Mythic Society and is drawn by the British. One can locate and view old names of places and buildings of Bangalore city. The floor map shows the east–west zones of the city. One gets to walk over the map while viewing various exhibits on display.

=== Kempegowda statues ===
A small statue depicting Kempegowda in Shivaganga has been placed at the entrance of the museum. The museum has an imposing fibreglass statue of Kempegowda place in the center of the hall on the first floor. The statue is placed in a manner that it appears to be welcoming visitors with its hands folded in a traditional Indian way.

=== Yelahanka dynasty ===
The museum also throws light on the Yelahanka clan that Kempegowda belonged to, the lineage of the Kempegowda family, their successors and has displays of the rulers of the dynasty. The foundation of Bangalore town, the commerce, water systems and religious agraharas (hamlets) built by the clan.

=== 16th century Bangalore ===
A background of 16th-century Bangalore and photographs of the city can be found. Many pictures of Kempegowda's territories, the forts, temples and water reservoirs built by him are displayed and are supported by historical facts and inscriptions displayed on the wall.

== Visitors ==
The Museum is open from Monday to Saturday, 9am-5pm. Currently there is no entry fee and it is open for all. There are no officially published statistics of visitors for the museum.

== Governance ==
The museum is funded by the Government of Karnataka and the BBMP (Bruhat Bengaluru Mahanagara Palike) is responsible for its upkeep. BBMP has also earmarked Rs. 5 crore for the museum project. The museum board includes litterateur D Jaware Gowda, retired IAS officer Chiranjeev Singh and museum's special officer Prof. Deverakonda Reddy.

== Expansion ==
There have been calls for expansion for the museum. Renowned Kannada writer D Javare Gowda called for the shifting of the court from Mayo Hall to expand the museum. Further expansion of the museum is planned in the ground floor. It is expected to house an interactive multimedia displays on Kempegowda's life and display of archive photographs.

The British Library, possess some of Kempe Gowda's memorabilia and other items directly related to the 16th century chieftain. The museum committee had found several books that referred to Kempe Gowda and his reign at the British Library. The museum is making efforts to get the books and other extracts from the library.

The museum is making efforts are on to procure the clothing, weapons and household items from Kempegowda's period from citizens and Kempe Gowda's descendants.

The Bruhat Bangalore Mahanagara Palike (BBMP) was looking for suitable spacious premises to set up the museum permanently within its jurisdiction. A six-acre plot had been identified in Malleswaram.

== See also ==
- List of museums in India
- List of tourist attractions in Bangalore
- List of things named after Kempe Gowda I
- Mayo Hall
