= Kempegowda Institute of Medical Sciences =

Medical college in Bangalore, India

- Type: Private Medical college
- Established: 1980; 46 years ago
- Affiliations: Rajiv Gandhi University of Health Sciences
- Principal: Dr. H. B. Shivakumar
- Location: Bengaluru, Karnataka, India; 12°57′23.4″N 77°34′27.4″E
- Website: www.kimsbangalore.edu.in

Kempegowda Institute of Medical Sciences is a medical college in the Indian state of Karnataka, affiliated to the Rajiv Gandhi University of Health Sciences, Jayanagar, Bengaluru.

== History ==
Kempegowda Institute of Medical Sciences was established in 1980 by the Vokkaligara Sangha. The Vokkaligara Sangha took a formal decision in 1979 to start a medical college from the year 1980–81 and applied for permission to the registrar, Bangalore University.

On 30 November 1980 the Hon'ble Chief Minister Shri. R Gundu Rao laid the foundation stone of the Kempegowda Institute of Medical Sciences and Hospital in the premises of the Sangha and announced the grant of vacant land in Banashankari to be used for the construction of college building and hostels. Thereafter, the Sangha appointed Dr M Basavaraju, professor of Physiology as the principal on 1 January 1981 and other staff by March 1981 and classes were started regularly from 16 March 1981. Since then 16 March is observed every year as KIMS Day.

The Silver Jubilee Celebrations of the institute was held in 2006. A college building to mark the centenary celebrations of the Vokkaligara Sangha and the Silver Jubilee of KIMS has been built at the Banashankari Campus.

== Courses ==
=== Undergraduate ===
The college offers the 5-year MBBS course. Admission is through the National Eligibility cum Entrance Test (NEET-UG) only. Management quota seats are also available .

=== Postgraduate ===
The postgraduate degree course is of three-years duration and the postgraduates diploma course two years. The college offers the following:

==== MD ====
- Anatomy
- Physiology
- Biochemistry
- Pharmacology
- Pathology
- Microbiology
- Forensic Medicine
- Community Medicine
- General Medicine
- Paediatrics
- Dermatology
- Radio Diagnosis
- Anaesthesiology
- Psychiatry

==== MS ====
- General Surgery
- O.B.G
- Ophthalmology
- E.N.T
- Orthopaedics

=== Diploma ===
- DA (Anaesthesiology)
- DCP (Pathology)
- DCH (Paediatrics)
- DGO (O.B.G)
- DOMS (Ophthalmology)
- D.Ortho. (Orthopaedics)
- D.L.O. (E.N.T.)
- DMRD (Radio Diagnosis)

These courses are recognised by National Medical Commission (N.M.C.) and Government of India.

== Campus ==
The college has two campuses. The hospital and clinical departments are on the VV Puram campus while the pre-clinical and para-clinical departments are on the Banashankari campus. Transport between the campuses is provided.

== Facilities ==
=== Hostels ===
There are two hostels, one for each gender, on the Banashankari campus.

=== Sports ===
The college has a fully equipped health club with a 10 station multi-gym, two treadmills and steppers and a trained instructor. Indoor games like chess, carrom and table tennis are available.

The college has three intracollegiate sports fests. They are the KPL (KIMS Premiere League) for cricket, KVL (KIMS Volleyball League) and Dinamani Cup (football).

=== Cultural activities ===
The college day, Atharva, allows the students to exhibit their talent in activities such as music, dance, mad ad, etc.

The intercollegiate quiz competition, Uttunga, is conducted by the college.

== Ranking ==
KIMS has been ranked No. 24 among the 275+ medical colleges in India by The MINT, The Wall Street Journal.

== See also ==
- List of things named after Kempe Gowda I
