= Statue of Mahatma Gandhi, Parliament of India =

Statue in the Indian parliament

Statue of Mahatma Gandhi
- Location: New Delhi
- Designer: Ram V. Sutar
- Type: Sculpture
- Material: Bronze
- Height: 4.9 meters
- Beginning date: 1969
- Completion date: 1993
- Opening date: 2 October 1993

The Statue of Mahatma Gandhi is a 16-foot (4.9 m) tall bronze statue of Mohandas Karamchand Gandhi located in the precincts of the Parliament House of India in New Delhi. Designed by Ram V. Sutar, it was inaugurated in 1993, and has become iconic as a site for protest by members of the Indian Parliament.

== History ==
The initial proposal to build a statue of Gandhi on the Central Vista of New Delhi was made after the removal of the statue of King George V from its canopy behind the India Gate in 1968. In 1969, it was announced in the Parliament that the statue would be installed at government's expense near the India Gate. In 1978, proposals for a statue were invited by the Morarji Desai–led government. Twelve entries were received from sculptors across India, of which Ram Sutar's design was selected. In 1981, it was decided to proceed with a design of Gandhi in a meditative posture to be installed at the canopy near the India Gate. However, these proposals were not implemented owing to considerations of aesthetics and opposition from architects and heritage conservationists, regarding proposals to remove the canopy to prepare a pedestal for the proposed statue. By 1989, the plaster casting for the statue was completed. The statue was completed by 1993 but the proposal to place it under the canopy was objected to by parliamentarians. The matter was raised in the Parliament by George Fernandes who accused the government of having left Gandhi "in the middle of the road". The statue was subsequently donated to the Parliament by the Ministry of Urban Development and was unveiled by President Shankar Dayal Sharma on Gandhi Jayanti, 1993.

== Design ==
Designed by Ram Sutar, the statue depicts a meditating Gandhi seated in the cross-legged position. Its location near the Gate No. 1 of the Parliament House was chosen so that parliamentarians exiting the building would see the peaceful figure. The statue is built of bronze and has a height of 16 feet (4.9 m). Gandhi's seated posture in the statue differs radically from his traditional representations, and it has been noted for the serenity of Gandhi's expression and the sombreness of his bearing.

== Site of protest ==
The location of the statue is frequently a venue of protests and impromptu press conferences by the Members of Parliament (MPs), especially by members of the opposition parties. In 2005, several members of the ruling party protested at the venue over the frequent parliamentary disruptions by the opposition. After the Lok Sabha Secretariat issued a bulletin barring MPs from using the premises of the parliament for holding any demonstrations or protests or religious ceremonies in 2022, Mahua Moitra, MP of the opposition Trinamool Congress, proposed that the statue itself be removed from the precincts of the Parliament House.

== Relocation ==
The statue was shifted from its location near the main gate of the Parliament building to a location near the Gate No. 3 as part of the construction work of the new parliament building. It is proposed to be relocated again to a prominent location in the precincts of the new building upon its completion.

== Replicas ==
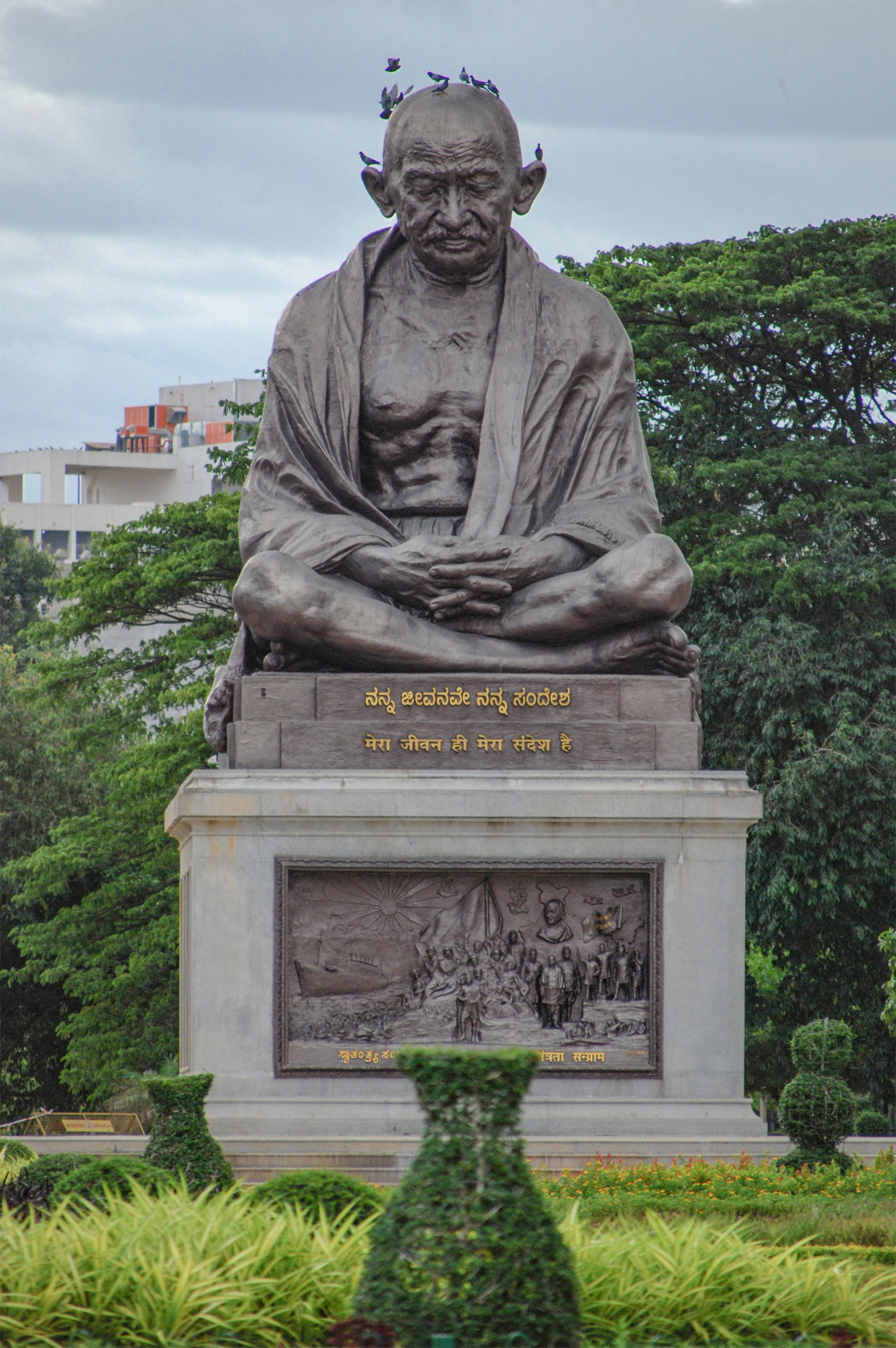
Mahatma Gandhi Statue, Vidhana Soudha

A 27-foot (8.2 m) tall statue of Gandhi at the Vidhana Soudha, Karanataka, inaugurated in 2014, is a replica of the statue in the Parliament House. Claimed to be the world's tallest statue of Gandhi in a seated position, this statue too was built by Ram Sutar.
