= Vokkaligara Sangha =

- Established: 1905
- Location: Bengaluru
- President: B. Kenchappa Gowda

Vokkaligara Sangha is a community organisation that was founded in 1905 in Mysore (now Bengaluru in Karnataka, India) to promote the social, cultural and educational aspirations of the Vokkaliga community. Its headquarters are in Bengaluru and there are many affiliated regional sanghas.

Nadaprabhu Kempegowda Vokkaligara Sangha, Sakleshpur, Hassan (2026)

== Management ==
Elected members handle key roles in the Sangha's activities, including institutions that it owns. They serve as community representatives of their regions.

== Institutions ==
The Sangha runs educational institutions such as the Bangalore Institute of Technology and the Kempegowda Institute of Medical Sciences.
