= List of things named after Kempe Gowda I =

Things named after Indian governor

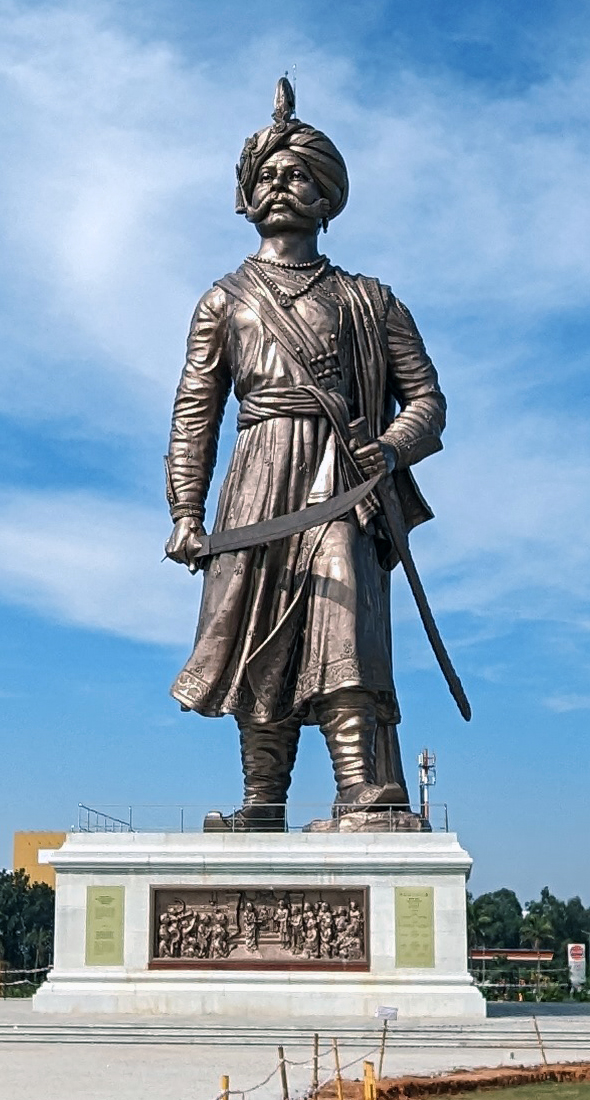
108-foot tall statue of Kempegowda near Kempegowda International Airport

Kempe Gowda I (27 June 1510 – 1569) was a governor under the Vijayanagara Empire in early-modern India. He founded the city of Bengaluru. Places and institutions named after him include:

== Educational institutions ==
- Kempegowda Institute of Medical Sciences
- Kempegowda Institute of Physiotherapy
- Kempegowda College of Nursing
- Kempegowda Residential PU College

== Public Infrastructure ==
=== Airports ===
- Kempegowda International Airport, Bengaluru

=== Roads ===
- Kempegowda Road, Bengaluru

=== Bus Stations ===
- Kempegowda Bus Station, Bengaluru

=== Metro Stations ===
- Nadaprabhu Kempegowda Metro Station, Purple Line (Namma Metro), Bengaluru

=== Railway stations ===
- Kempegowda International Airport halt railway station

== Residential Areas ==
- Nadaprabhu Kempegowda Layout

== Monuments and memorials ==
- Statue of Prosperity
- Kempegowda Museum

== Organisations ==
- Nadaprabhu Kempegowda Development Authority

== Awards ==
- Kempegowda Award
