= Mayo Hall (Bengaluru) =

Historic building

Coordinates: 12.974079°N 77.610632°E

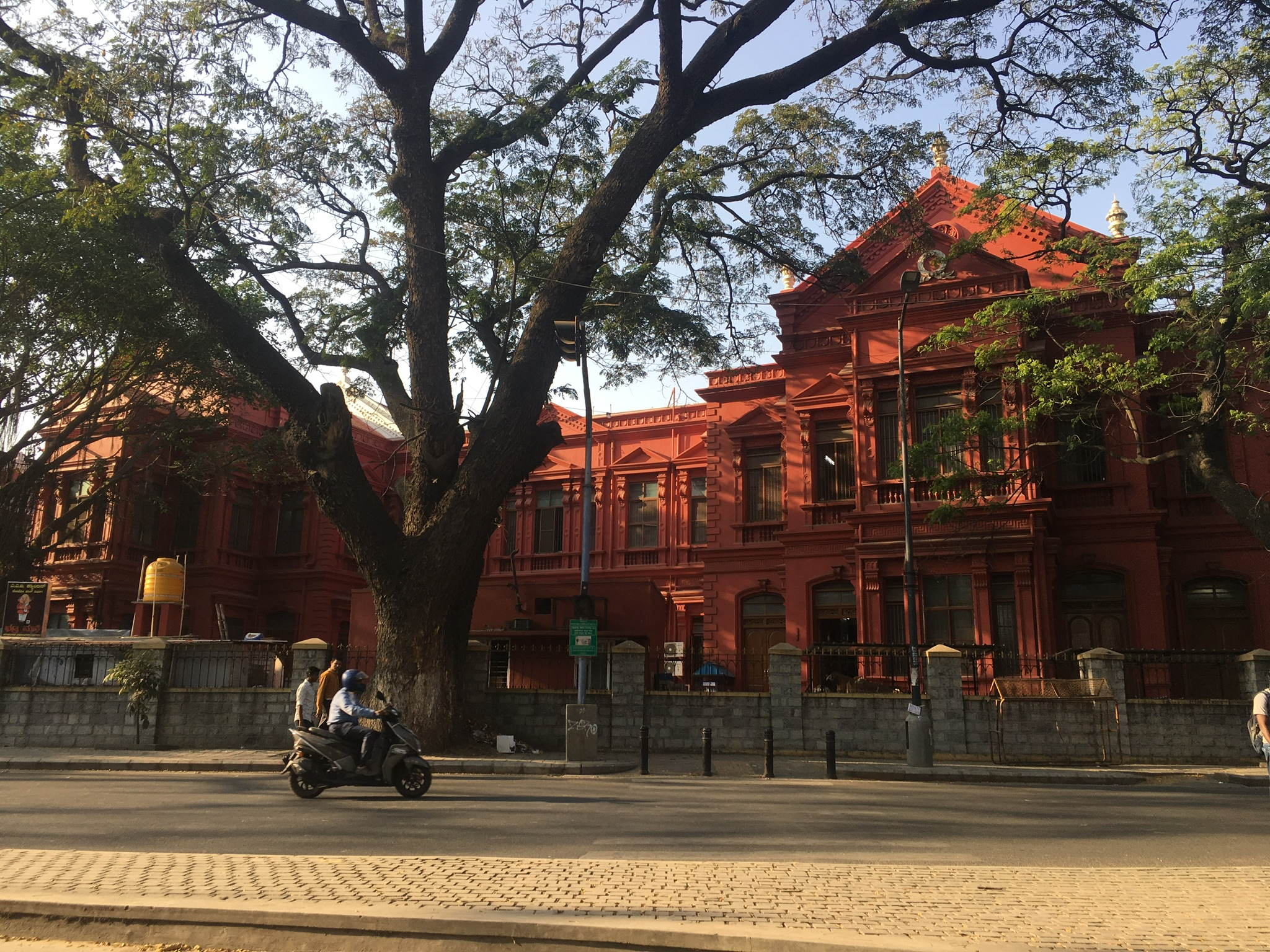
Mayo Hall, exterior view, February 2020. Note that after a renovation in 2015, the appearance of the building changed from red-and-white to all red.

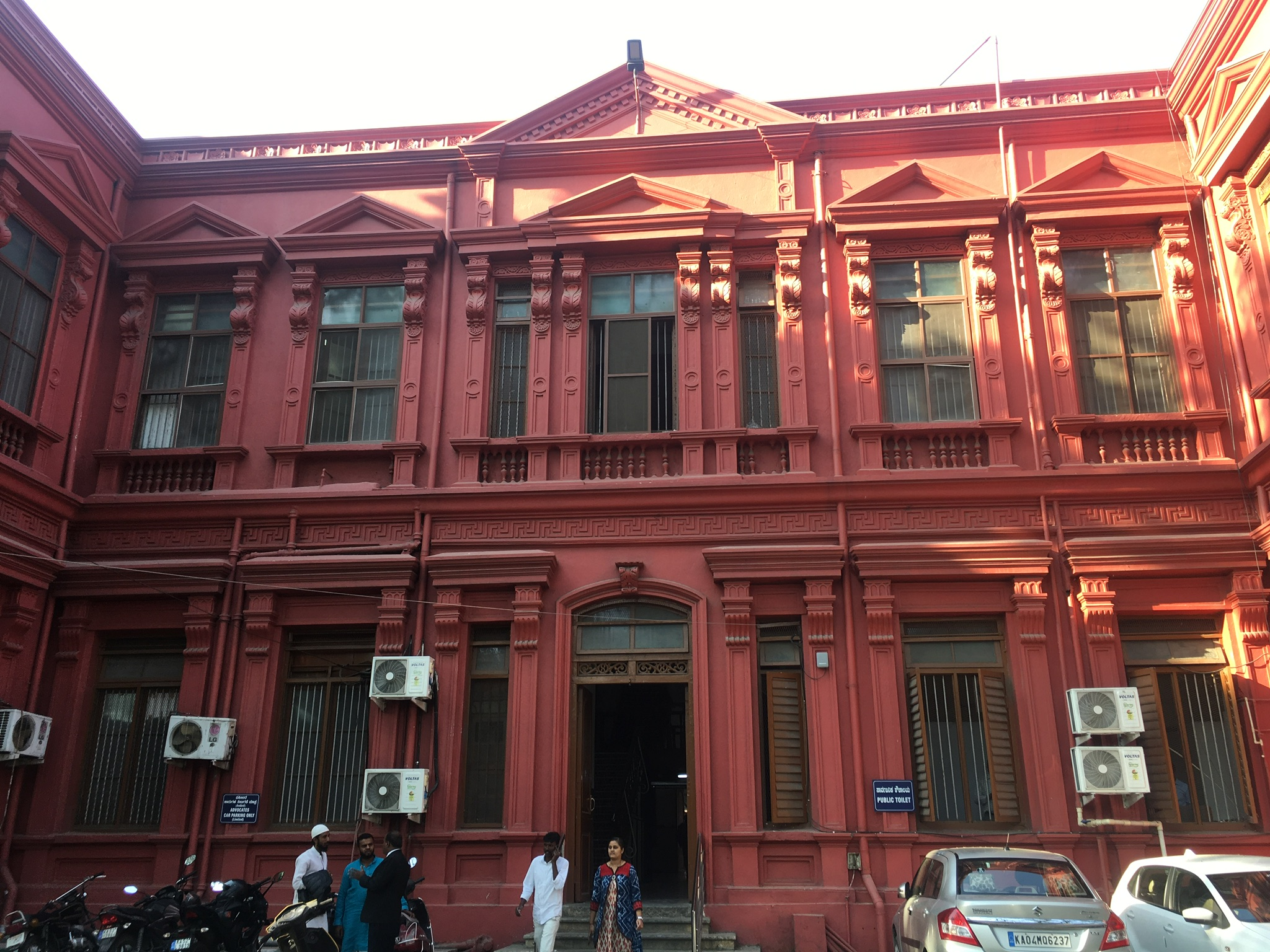
Mayo Hall, entrance, February 2020.

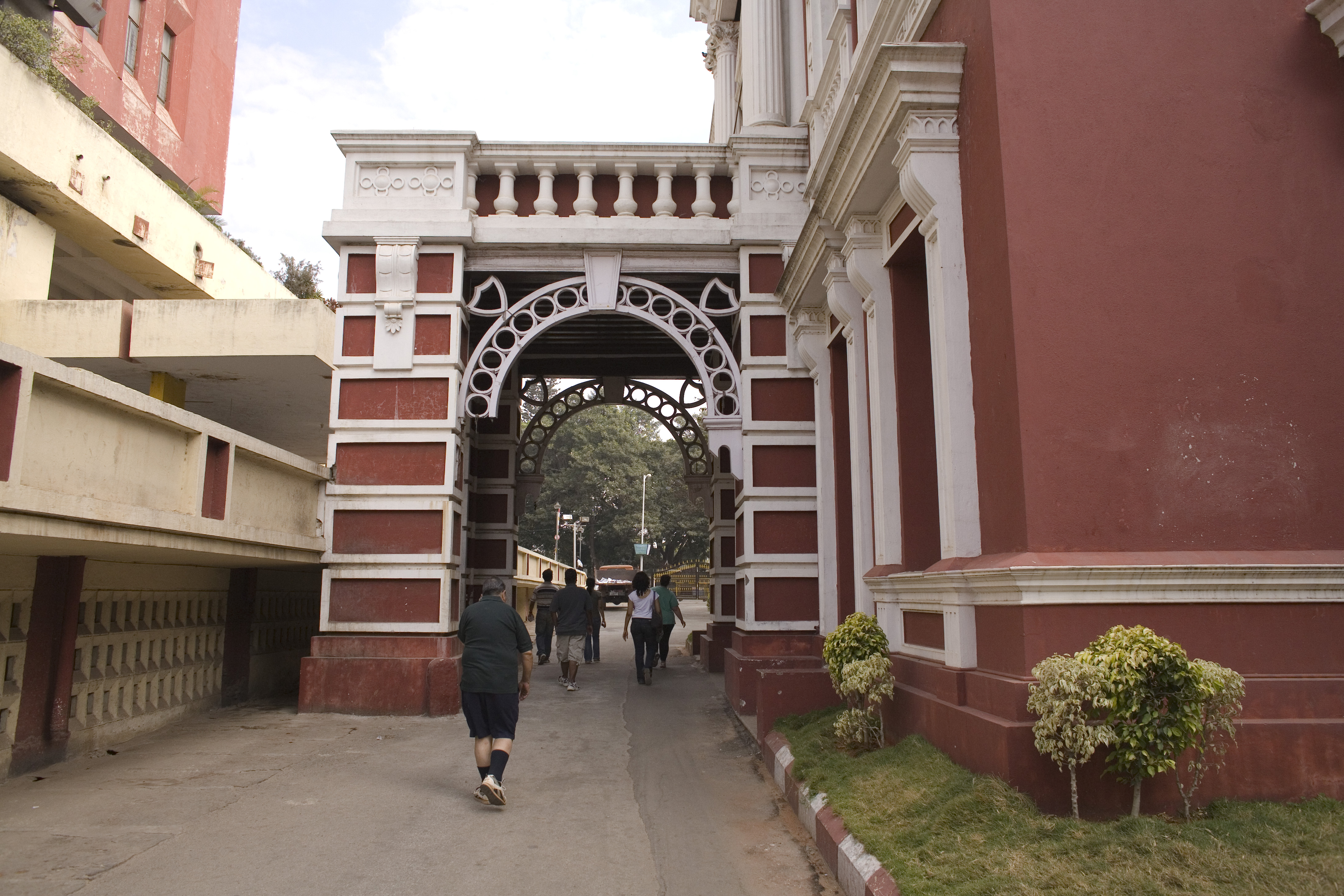
West side driveway with arch, Mayo Hall, 2007

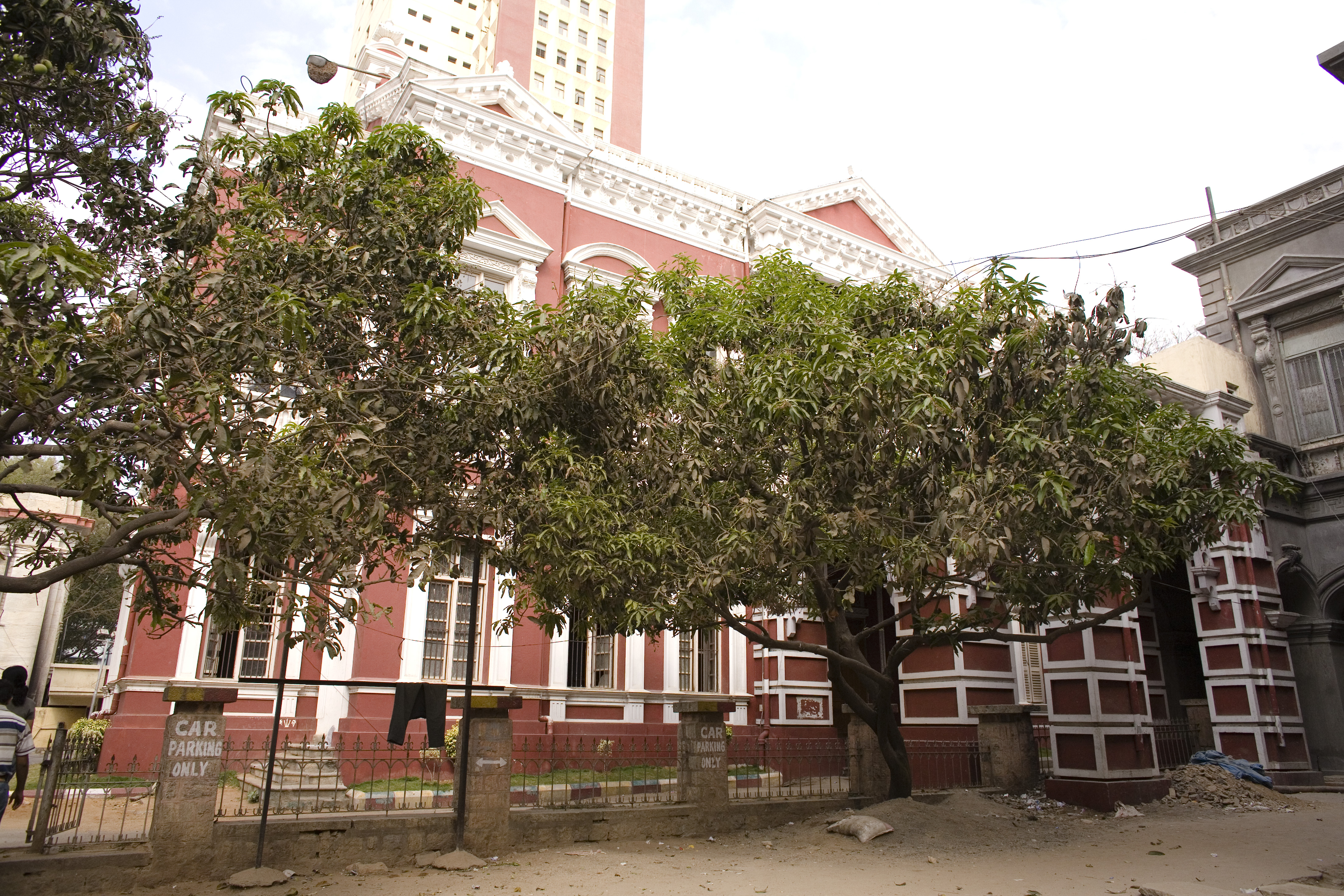
External view of Mayo Hall, 2007

Mayo Hall is a government building located in the center of Bangalore. It was built to honor the memory of Richard Bourke the 4th Viceroy of India. It offers a panoramic view of the city's Parade Grounds and Ulsoor Lake on one side, and the Bangalore Race Course and Brigade Grounds on the south.

This two-story structure is known for its ornate furniture and architecture. It is adorned by chandeliers, Greek cornices, Tuscan columns, stone arches, wooden floors and beautiful furnishings. It became a popular tourist attraction.

== Municipal offices ==
Mayo Hall houses several departments of Bangalore Mahanagara Palike, Bangalore's administrative body. The government's Kempegowda Museum is located on the upper floor. It was established in 2011, and is dedicated to Kempegowda, the founder of Bangalore.The museum has Kempegowda's statue as well as artistic renderings from his time.

Originally, the ground floor had the Municipal Office for the Cantonment as well as several public offices and law courts. The upper floor was intended for important public meetings and exhibitions.

== History ==
Mayo Hall was a part of a larger design to develop the cantonment into an integrated civil and military station. Accordingly, around the mid-1800s, a series of developmental activities began.

The army that defeated Tipu Sultan in the 4th Mysore War was relocated from the swamps of Srirangapatana to the more temperate Bangalore in 1809. The crown's administrative staff and the army's families began arriving, after sailing around the Cape of Good Hope. Tradesmen also arrived in this manner and contributed to the westernization of Bangalore.

Richard Bourke was appointed the Viceroy and Governor-General of India. In the period 1869–1872, he traveled extensively in India and was greatly impressed, and stated that Britain should hold India "as long as the sun shines in heaven".

On a visit to Port Blair's prison, Richard Bourke was stabbed to death by Sher Ali, a Pathan life convict, the only Viceroy to be murdered in office. The convict who killed him did so to avenge his father's death in the First Anglo-Afghan War.

As a tribute to this administrator, a commemorative building was erected on the South Parade on a flat ground with trees, flowering bushes and a low wall on the south side. Terraced lawns surrounded the two-story building. It cost around ₹45,000, a sum raised largely through public donations.

Mayo Hall was inaugurated by the British Resident on 6 June 1883. The Bangalore District Gazetteer noted that "The building in elevation is remarkable for its composition of architrave and pedimented windows, varied with key-storied arches, beautifully executed consoles, balustraded ledges and typical Greek cornice."

Inside the building, framed pictures of the British nobility and notable citizens could be found in the hall. On the first floor, Italian chandeliers and ornate furniture were installed.

The late Kora Chandy described the Mayo Hall as "one of the most elegant public buildings of the era in Southern India." Several Greco-Roman elements and influences are apparent in the building: architrave and pediment windows, key-stoned arches, balustrade ledges, beautiful consoles, Greek cornices, Tuscan columns, and wooden floors.

== Modern era ==
Mayo Hall stands shorn of its greenery and breathing space. Tall buildings such as the Public Utility Building and the Central Mall are its neighbours. Heavy traffic generates significant sound pollution, and the future of this historical building remains uncertain.
