= Kempegowda International Airport halt railway station =

Railway station in Karnataka, India

Kempegowda International Airport Halt Kempēgauḍa Antarāṣṭrīya Vimāna Nildāṇa Nilugaḍe Kempegauda Antarraashtreey Havaee Adda Padaav
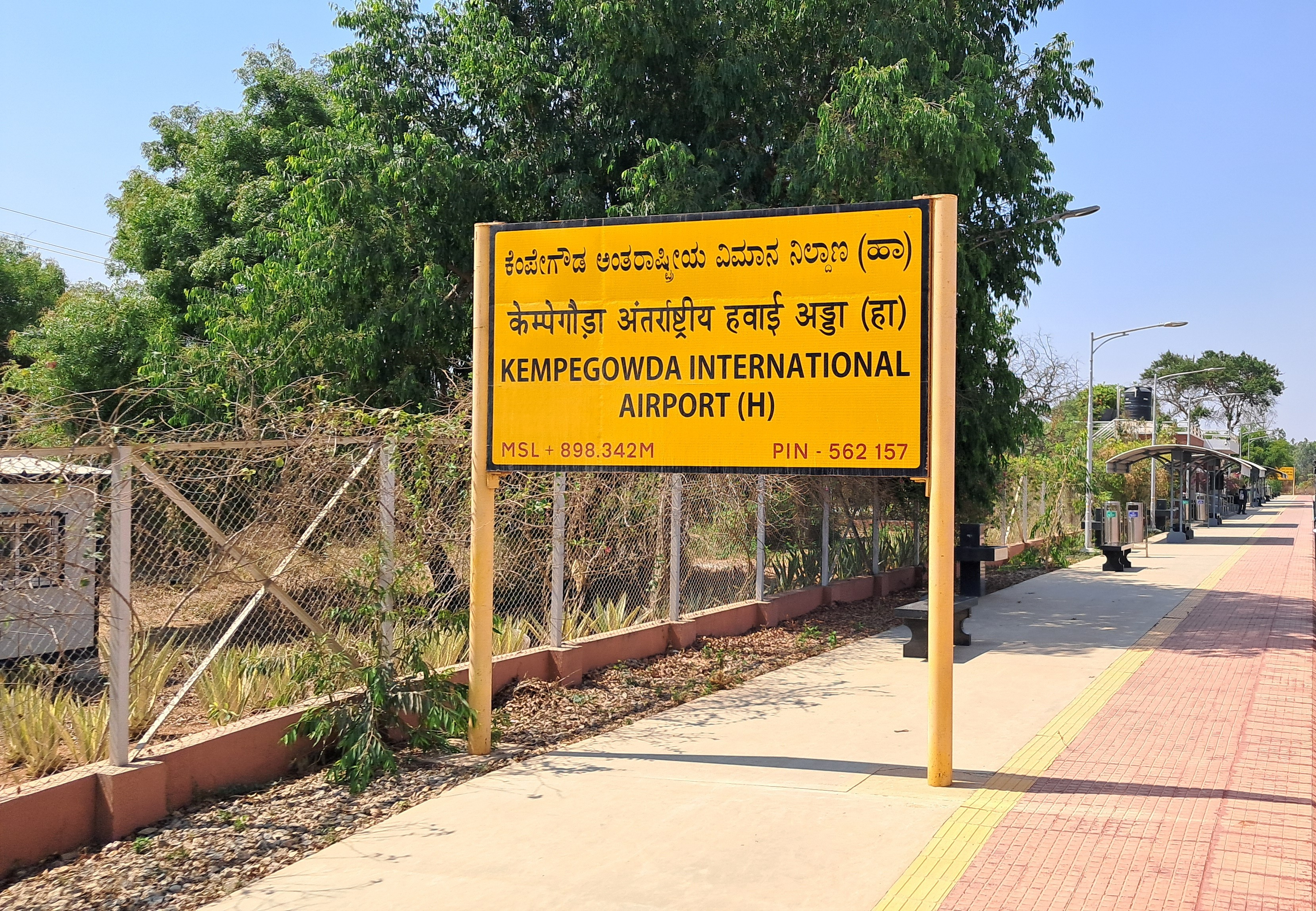
- KIA Halt railway station board

General information
- Other names: KIA Halt
- Location: Devanahalli, Bangalore Rural, Karnataka; India
- Coordinates: 13.21062°N 77.67675°E
- System: Indian Railways station
- Owner: Indian Railways
- Operator: South Western Railway zone
- Lines: Bangarpet–Bangalore railway line (via Chickkaballapur, Kolar)
- Platforms: 1
- Tracks: 1
- Connections: Auto stand, shuttle bus service

Construction
- Structure type: Standard (on ground station)
- Parking: No
- Cycle facilities: No

Other information
- Status: Functioning
- Station code: KIAD
- Zone(s): South Western Railway zone
- Division(s): Bangalore

History
- Opened: 2020

Services
| Preceding station | Indian Railways | Following station |
|---|---|---|
| Dodjala towards ? | South Western Railway zone Bangalore–Kolar line | Devanahalli towards ? |
Location

Kempegowda International Airport Halt railway station (station code: KIAD) is an Indian Railways railway station located near Kempegowda International Airport, Bangalore in the Indian state of Karnataka, about 45 km away from the Bangalore City on the Yelahanka–Kolar line. This station will serve the Kempegowda International Airport.

== History ==
In 2014, BIAL suggested building a halt train station on a line which runs along the northeast boundary of the airport. In 2019 it received permission to construct a halt station on the existing Yalahanka–Devanahalli line.. The station is being built by the airport operator, Bengaluru International Airport Limited (BIAL). Upon completion, the station will be handed over to the railways.

== Structure and expansion ==
Kempegowda International Airport Halt has one platform running 400m in length. Shelters, lighting, benches and a booking office facility are available.

== Shuttle service ==
A free shuttle service is operated by the Bengaluru airport operator. The shuttle timings are synchronized with the train timings.

== Trains between Bengaluru and Kempegowda International Airport Halt Station ==
Frequency: 6 days a week (except Sunday)
| Trains from the city towards the airport | | | | | | | Stations | | Trains from the airport towards the city | | | | | |
| 06531 MEMU | 06387 DMU | 06593 MEMU | 06536 MEMU | 06538 MEMU | 16549 DEMU | | Stations | | 16550 DEMU | 06535 MEMU | 06594 MEMU | 06537 MEMU | 06388 DMU | 06532 MEMU |
|---|---|---|---|---|---|---|---|---|---|---|---|---|---|---|
| | 08:35 | | | | 18:20 | ↓ | Bangalore City (KSR Bengaluru) | ↑ | 09:35 | | | | | |
| | - | | | | 18:26 | ↓ | Malleswaram | ↑ | 09:17 | | | | | |
| 05:10 | 08:45 | | 11:00 | 16:00 | - | ↓ | Bangalore Cant | ↑ | - | 10:40 | | 15:30 | 17:35 | 21:00 |
| - | 08:50 | | - | - | - | ↓ | Bangalore East | ↑ | - | - | | - | 17:02 | - |
| 05:20 | 08:56 | | 11:10 | 16:10 | - | ↓ | Baiyappanahalli | ↑ | - | 09:38 | | 15:12 | 16:55 | 20:12 |
| - | - | | - | - | - | ↓ | Channasandra | ↑ | - | - | | - | - | - |
| - | - | 10:10 | - | - | 18:32 | ↓ | Yasvantpur Jn | ↑ | 09:11 | - | 14:50 | - | - | - |
| - | - | 10:20 | - | - | 18:41 | ↓ | Lottegollahalli | ↑ | 08:57 | - | 14:16 | - | - | - |
| - | - | 10:23 | - | - | 18:45 | ↓ | Kodigehalli | ↑ | 08:53 | - | 14:12 | - | - | - |
| 05:45 | 09:18 | 10:31 | 11:32 | 16:33 | 18:56 | ↓ | Yelahanka | ↑ | 08:45 | 09:16 | 14:03 | 14:45 | 16:32 | 19:50 |
| 05:56 | 09:29 | 10:42 | 11:43 | 16:44 | 19:07 | ↓ | Bettalsoor | ↑ | 08:30 | 09:11 | 13:52 | 14:33 | 16:19 | 19:36 |
| 06:04 | 09:34 | 10:48 | 11:49 | 16:50 | 19:12 | ↓ | Doddajala H | ↑ | 08:25 | 09:05 | 13:45 | 14:27 | 16:14 | 19:31 |
| 06:11 | 09:41 | 10:55 | 12:02 | 16:56 | 19:19 | ↓ | Kempegowda International Airport Halt | ↑ | 08:18 | 08:58 | 13:37 | 14:20 | 16:08 | 19:23 |
| 06:19 | 09:48 | 11:03 | 12:12 | 17:03 | 19:26 | ↓ | Devanahalli | ↑ | 08:11 | 08:48 | 13:28 | 14:10 | 16:01 | - |
| 06:27 | 09:56 | 11:11 | 12:20 | 17:11 | 19:34 | ↓ | Avatihalli H | ↑ | 08:03 | 08:41 | 13:21 | 14:01 | 15:53 | 19:08 |
| 06:31 | 10:00 | 11:15 | 12:24 | 17:15 | 19:38 | ↓ | Venkatagirikote Halt | ↑ | 07:59 | 08:37 | 13:17 | 13:57 | 15:49 | 19:04 |
| 06:38 | 10:08 | 11:22 | 12:31 | 17:22 | 19:46 | ↓ | Nandi Halt | ↑ | 07:51 | 08:31 | 13:11 | 13:51 | 15:41 | 18:57 |
| 06:55 | 10:15 | 11:40 | 12:55 | 18:00 | 19:53 | ↓ | Chik Ballapur | ↑ | 07:44 | 08:20 | 13:00 | 13:40 | 15:34 | 18:50 |
| | - - - - | | | | | ↓ | - - - - - - - - - - | ↑ | - - - - | | | | - - - - | |
| | 12:45 | | | | 21:41 | ↓ | Kolar | ↑ | 06:15 | | | | 14:05 | |

Source: NTES 02/08/2024

== See also ==
- Namma Metro
- Bengaluru Commuter Rail
- List of railway stations in India
- List of things named after Kempe Gowda I
