= Siemens Financial Services =

Financing and business division of Siemens

Siemens Financial Services GmbH
- Company type: Subsidiary
- Founded: 1997; 29 years ago in Munich
- Headquarters: Munich, Germany
- Area served: Worldwide
- Key people: Veronika Bienert (CEO); Dr. Andreas Rudolf (CFO)
- Products: Equipment financing & leasing, vendor finance, asset-based lending, private equity, project and equity participations, project and export financing, industrial insurance solutions, treasury solutions, structured financing, banking
- Services: Business services, financing
- Number of employees: 3,150 (2011)
- Parent: Siemens
- Website: siemens.com/finance

Siemens Financial Services GmbH (SFS) is a division of the German Siemens company that offers international financing in the business-to-business area. The company’s global headquarters is in Munich, Germany.

SFS serves both Siemens and external clients, primarily in the energy, industry, healthcare and infrastructure & cities markets. The division finances infrastructure, equipment as well as working capital investments, and acts as a manager of financial risks within Siemens AG.

The network of financing companies coordinated by Siemens Financial Services GmbH in Munich comprises about 3,150 employees worldwide.

== History ==
The Siemens Group first bundled its financial activities into an organizational unit in October 1997. In addition to developing the financial business, the main focus at the time was to increase transparency for investors – by creating a separate financing balance sheet. Since 1999, Siemens Financial Services has been the center of expertise for financial services and the provider of financial risk management for Siemens in the market for business-to-business financial solutions.

From the very start, SFS’ responsibility included Siemens’ leasing and alternative forms of asset and equipment financing as well as project financing and equity participations. SFS was also put in charge of Siemens’ treasury and payment-transaction solutions as well as of the financial management of pension assets. In 2000, these responsibilities were expanded to include Siemens’ insurance operations – and later its venture capital activities.

In addition to the expansion of business operations, SFS’ international presence has grown (including the acquisition of Schroder Leasing in Great Britain in 2000).

In recent years, expansion has taken place not only in the established European and North American markets, but also increasingly in emerging markets. In March 2005, Siemens Financial Services established its own leasing company in China, Siemens Finance and Leasing Ltd. (SFLL) with headquarters in Beijing. At the start of 2011, Russia’s Federal Antimonopoly Services approved the acquisition of ZAO DeltaLeasing, a provider of equipment financing in Russia. On October 1, 2011, DeltaLeasing was renamed OOO Siemens Finance.

In June 2011, Siemens Financial Services Private Limited was established in India and was granted its non-banking finance license (NBFC license) from the Reserve Bank of India (RBI). Since then, the subsidiary has been providing financing solutions for Siemens’ customers in India.

At the end of 2010, Siemens Financial Services received its banking license in Germany from the German Federal Financial Supervisory Authority. Siemens Bank GmbH adds loans and guarantees to the SFS product portfolio particularly in the sales-financing area.

In 2019, some of the functions of SFS has been moved to Siemens AG, as corporate unit, CF Financing.

== Executive management ==
- Veronika Bienert, CEO of Siemens Financial Services GmbH since October 2021.
- Dr. Andreas Rudolf, CFO of Siemens Financial Services GmbH since October 2021.

== Business units ==
Siemens Financial Services (SFS) has four Business Units:

- Commercial Finance (COF)
- Equity Finance (EQ)
- Project & Structured Finance Debt - Americas (PS-AM)
- Project & Structured Finance Debt - EMEA / AA (PS-EA)

== Global reach ==
As a worldwide financial services provider in the business-to-business area, SFS has an international network of financing companies at its disposal (as of September 30, 2016).

- North and South America
  - Total assets €12.3 billion
- Europe, Africa & CIS
  - Total assets €11.1 billion
- Asia, Australia, and the Middle East
  - Total assets €3.1 billion

== Research ==
The company provides research covering aspects of finance. Research reports written over the past four years include:

2011	2010	2009	2008
The Affordable Metropolis	Energy down, momentum up 2010	Riding the Storm – A study on the current financing situation	Counting the Cost - analyzing the real impact of the international financial crisis on relationship banking for European business
Investment in Focus	Navigating uncertain waters	Maintaining the green momentum – A study of European private sector investment in green equipment and technologies	Putting Capital to Work - A study of private sector working capital in Europe and the United States
Medical Equipment and Frozen Capital	Energy Efficiency - Trends, Investment Challenges & Financing Solutions		
	Productivity – Providing answers to a dynamic global market		
	Integrated Healthcare – Challenges in the medical sector		
