= Sarla Aviation =

Indian aerospace startup

- Company type: Private
- Industry: Aerospace Electric aircraft
- Founded: October 2023
- Founders: Adrian Schmidt; Rakesh Gaonkar
- Headquarters: Bengaluru, India
- Key people: Adrian Schmidt (CEO) Rakesh Gaonkar (CTO)
- Products: eVTOL aircraft
- Number of employees: ~70 (2025)
- Website: www.sarla-aviation.com

Sarla Aviation is an Indian aerospace company headquartered in Bengaluru, founded in October 2023. The company develops electric vertical takeoff and landing (eVTOL) aircraft for urban air mobility in India. The company is named after Sarla Thakral, India's first female pilot. As of December 2025, Sarla Aviation has commenced ground testing on a sub-scale demonstrator and plans commercial operations by 2028–2029.

== History ==
Sarla Aviation was founded in October 2023 by Adrian Schmidt and Rakesh Gaonkar, both having prior experience at the German eVTOL firm Lilium. The startup raised $13 million across pre-seed, seed, and Series A rounds, including investments from Accel, Zerodha co-founder Nikhil Kamath, and Flipkart co-founder Binny Bansal. In January 2025, the company unveiled a full-scale static prototype named Shunya at the Bharat Mobility Global Expo in New Delhi. On December 22, 2025, Sarla Aviation announced the start of ground testing for its half-scale eVTOL demonstrator, named SYLLA SYL-X1, at its Bengaluru facility. The 7.5-meter wingspan aircraft was developed in approximately nine months and is described as the largest privately developed eVTOL demonstrator in India.

== Aircraft ==
=== Shunya ===
Shunya is the company's planned full-scale production eVTOL aircraft, a six-passenger (plus pilot) design intended for urban air taxi services, with potential uses in air ambulance and cargo. Reported specifications include a top speed of 250 km/h, a range optimized for 20–30 km urban trips (potentially up to 160 km with future batteries), and a payload of 680 kg. A full-scale static prototype was displayed in 2025, with a planned wingspan of 15 meters.

=== SYLLA SYL-X1 ===
The SYLLA SYL-X1 is a half-scale demonstrator aircraft with a 7.5-meter wingspan, designed for validation of structural integrity, propulsion, and safety systems. Built with certification intent, it serves as a technology bridge to the full-scale Shunya. Ground testing began in December 2025.

== Manufacturing and operations ==
In November 2025, Sarla Aviation announced a ₹1,300 crore investment for a 500-acre "Sky Factory" manufacturing campus in Anantapur, Andhra Pradesh, targeting production of up to 1,000 aircraft annually by 2029. The company aims to launch initial services in Bengaluru by 2028, expanding to other cities, with plans for vertiport networks and partnerships.

== See also ==
eVTOL

Urban Air Mobility

Aviation in India
