= Samparka Sarige =

Public bus service in India

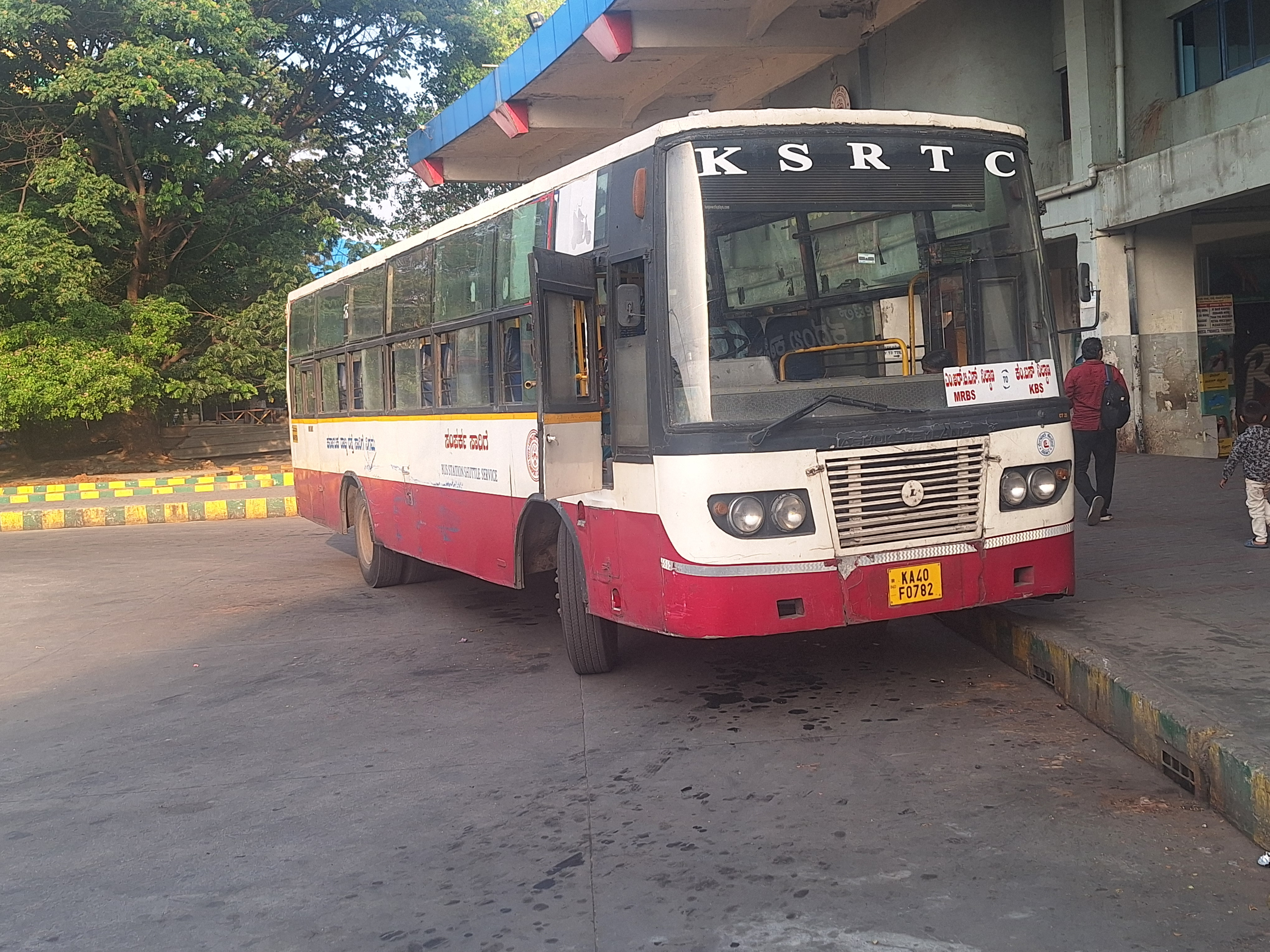
- Samparka Sarige at Mysore Road Bus Station.
- Parent: Karnataka State Road Transport Corporation
- Founded: 20 August 2011
- Locale: Bengaluru
- Service area: Kempegowda Bus Station,Mysore Road Bus Station
- Service type: Non-AC Seater feeder bus connecting with major bus stands in Bangalore
- Fleet: Uses fleet of Nagara Sarige Diesel bus
- Fuel type: Diesel
- Operator: KSRTC (under Government of Karnataka)
- Website: mybmtc.karnataka.gov.in/en

The Samparka Sarige is a non-AC bus service with 2+2 non-reclining seats built on bi-axle Ashok Leyland, Tata and Eicher with white-pink livery. It is a shuttle bus service between Kempegowda Bus Station and Mysuru Road Bus Station in Bengaluru.

== History ==
After new bus stand inaugrated at Mysuru Road Satellite bus stand and shifting origin of buses plying towards Mysuru and Coorg from Kempegowda Bus Station to Mysuru Road Satellite bus stand. 10 feeder buses were inaugrated by then Transport Minister of Karnataka R. Ashoka on 20th August,2011.

== Description ==
These buses are meant to improve connectivity between to major bus Stands Kempegowda Bus Station and Mysore road bus Station.These are operated in Bangalore city by KSRTC (Which bmtc operates in this jurisdiction.

== Routes ==
| Sl.No | Origin | Terminus | Via | Distance(in kms) |
|---|---|---|---|---|
| 1 | Kempegowda Bus Station | Mysore Road Bus Station | Cottonpet Hospital,Sirsi Circle,Bapuji Nagara | 10 |

== Welfares and schemes ==
=== 'Shakti Scheme' free bus service for women ===
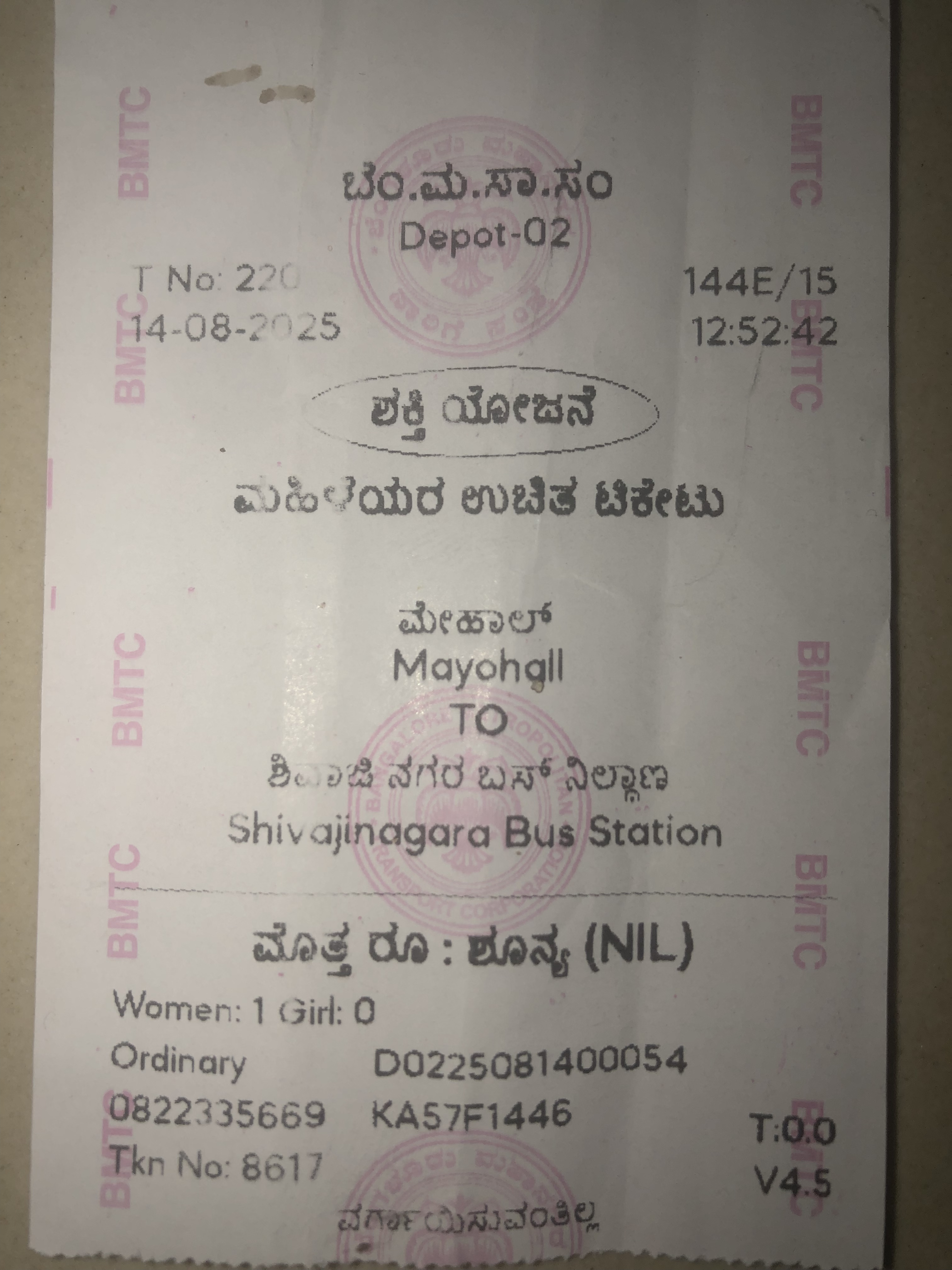
Non-Ac bus Shakthi Yojana Ticket

'Shakti Scheme' was announced by the Second Siddaramaiah ministry on 2 June 2023. It started on 11 June 2023, providing free-of-charge bus service to Karnataka-domiciled women. Beneficiaries show their government-issued photo identification and address proof for the first three months. Bus conductors issue them zero-fare tickets. Thereafter, beneficiaries obtain Shakti smartcards (named after the name of the scheme) through an application submitted via the government's Seva Sindhu website.

==== Terms and conditions of the scheme ====
- The scheme will apply to all four Road Transport Corporations in the state (KSRTC, BMTC, NWKRTC and KKRTC).
- Samparka Sarige is part of this scheme.
- Women can travel for free only on bus services within the state. Bus services to destinations outside Karnataka will be outside the scheme's purview even if women travel within the state. For example, a woman travelling to Mangaluru in Karnataka i.e., within the state on an Udupi-Kasaragod bus service which is an interstate service to Kasaragod in neighbouring Kerala, will have to buy a ticket.
- The scheme will not apply to luxury buses (Vajra Metro feeders)
- Half of the seats on BMTC ordinary and express buses will be reserved for men. Luxury, AC and interstate buses as well as BMTC buses will be exempted from this.
- The government will reimburse the BMTC based on the distance women travel.

=== Free bus passes for students ===
In June 2026 Karnataka government under the chief ministry of D.K. Shivakumar announced free buses for students studying in Karnataka from primary school to postgraduate level and border areas within 20 km of Karnataka border. It is free for both boys and girls.

- Samparka Sarige is part of this scheme.

== See also ==
- Nagara Sarige
- Karnataka Sarige
