= EV Power Plus+ =

Public bus service in India

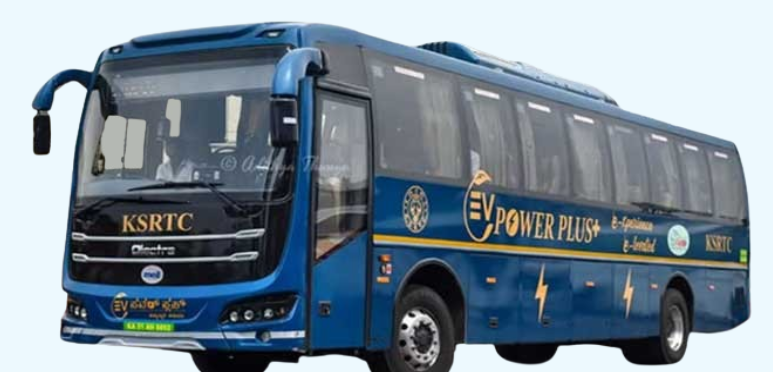
- KSRTC'S EV Power Plus+.
- Parent: Karnataka State Road Transport Corporation
- Founded: 16th January 2023
- Locale: Karnataka
- Service area: cities in karnataka
- Service type: Electric AC Seater Intercity connecting major cities
- Fleet: 50
- Fuel type: electric bus
- Operator: Olectra (under Karnataka State Road Transport Corporation Gross Cost Contract (GCC) model)
- Website: myksrtc.karnataka.gov.in/en

EV Power Plus+ is a series of Electric AC Luxury Intercity Bus service running on Olectra electric bus fleet with a Dark blue livery operated by KSRTC from Bengaluru city to various cities in Karnataka.

== History ==
KSRTC's EV Power Plus intercity electric bus service was officially inaugurated on 16 January 2023 as Karnataka's first state-run intercity electric bus project by then Chief Minister of Karnataka Basavaraj Bommai.

== Description ==
These buses consists of 2+2 reclining seats similar to Rajahamsa Executive Class but these are Electric AC buses compared to Non-AC Diesel Buses. These buses cover distances up to 300 km.

== Operations ==
These buses are operated by Olectra Greentech Limited under GCC Model (FAME-II Scheme) of KSRTC. These have contract of 12 years of operations and maintenance.

== Routes ==
Sl.No	Origin	Terminus	Via	References
1	Bengaluru	Mysuru	Mysuru Satellite Bus Stand, Kengeri	
2	Bengaluru	Madikeri	Mysuru, Hunsur, Piriyapatna, Kushalnagar, Suntikoppa	
3	Bengaluru	Virajpet	Mysuru, Hunsur, Gonikoppal	
4	Bengaluru	Davangere	Chitradurga	
5	Bengaluru	Shivamogga	Chitradurga, Hollakere, Channagiri	
6	Bengaluru	Chikkamagaluru	Hassan, Belur, Karnataka	

== Welfares and schemes ==
'Shakti Scheme' is not applicable on this bus services.

== See also ==
- Rajahamsa Executive Class
- Airavat Club Class
