= Sirijholi =

Sirijholi Sirijholly
- village
- Location in Odisha, India Sirijholi (India)
- Coordinates: 19°05′24″N 83°46′48″E
- Country: India
- State: Odisha
- District: Rayagada

Government
  - Type: Democratic
- Elevation: 91 m (299 ft)

Population (2011)
  - Total: 1,499

Languages
  - Official: Odia
- Time zone: UTC+5:30 (IST)
- PIN: 765022
- Telephone code: 06857
- Vehicle registration: OD
- Website: odisha.gov.in

Sirijholi, also spelled Sirijholly), is a medium-sized village located in the Indian state of Odisha in the Gunupur block of the Rayagada district. It is the panchayat headquarter of the Sirijholi Grama Panchayat and is administrated by a Sarapancha.

== Demography ==
Sirijholi village is about 81 km (50 mi) east of the district headquarters and 252 km (157 mi) from the state capital at Bhubaneswar. The total population of the village at the 2011 Census of India is 1499 out of which the male population is 730 and the female population is 769. Sirijholi is located at Lat. 19° 05' 24" N and Lon. 83° 46' 48" E. There is no direct rail or air communication to Sirijholli . The nearest airport is Bhubaneswar and the nearest railway station is Gunupur. One can reach Sirijholi via Gunupur or Rayagada by Odisha State Road Transport Corporation buses or private buses.

== Educational institutions ==
- Govt. M.E School, Sirijholi
- Govt. Upgraded High School, Sirijholi

== Temples ==
- Radhakrushna Mandira (ରାଧାକୃଷ୍ଣ ମନ୍ଦିର)
- Thakurani Gudi (ଠାକୁରାଣୀ ଗୁଡି଼)

== Festivals ==
One of the major festivals celebrated in the village is Dola Jatra (ଦୋଳ ଯାତ୍ରା). It is observed on the last day of the month of Phalguna (ଫାଲ୍ଗୁନ). The Radha and Krishna idols are taken out of the temple and are set to swing on a vimana (ବିମାନ) in the Mandap (ମଣ୍ଡପ). Most of the nearby villagers participate in this festival. Traditional dance is organised in the night. Holi is being celebrated in the following day. Ugadi, Bhogi, the Odia new year Pana Sankranti (ପଣା ସଂକ୍ରାନ୍ତି/ମେଷ ସଂକ୍ରାନ୍ତି) and Makara Sankranti (ମକର ସଂକ୍ରାନ୍ତି) are some of the other festivals celebrated in the village.
