= Akshay Nagar =

Akshay Nagar Akshayanagar
- Neighbourhood
- Location in Bengaluru, India
- Coordinates: 12.874082°N 77.615815°E
- Country: India
- State: Karnataka
- Metro: Bengaluru

Languages
  - Official: Kannada
- Time zone: UTC+5:30 (IST)
- PIN: 560114

Akshay Nagar is a neighbourhood in Begur ward in Southeast Bangalore. It is surrounded by Hulimavu to the west and Begur to the east. The area has undergone rapid residential and commercial development since the early 2010s, including several high-rise apartment complexes. The locality is in close proximity to the Bannerghatta National Park, thus leading to occasional sightings of wild animals from the forest reserve. The area has a lake spread over 5 acres. It also features a wide mix of modern architecture and buildings.Many facilities required for a comfortable neighbourhood are present evenly across this area.

== Accessibility ==
Akshay Nagar is connected to several parts of the city by BMTC bus service, as well as to the airport by Vayu Vajra. The under-construction Kalena Agrahara – Nagawara route of the Namma Metro is expected to improve connectivity to the neighbourhood with other parts of the city. Landmarks around the neighbourhood include the Indian Institute of Management- Bangalore, Meenakshi Temple and Vadiraja Kala Bhavan, a cultural center that hosts events promoting traditional and contemporary arts.
