= KSRTC =

KSRTC may refer to:

- Karnataka State Road Transport Corporation
- Kerala State Road Transport Corporation
