= Shiragaonwadi =

- Village
- Location in Karnataka, India Shiragaonwadi (India)
- Coordinates: 16.4836°N 74.5095°E
- Country: India
- State: Karnataka
- District: Belgaum
- Talukas: Chikodi

Population (2011)
  - Total: 1,554

Languages
  - Official: Kannada
  - Other: Marathi
- Time zone: UTC+5:30 (IST)
- Postal code: 591 214
- Vehicle registration: KA23

Shiragaonwadi is a village in Chikodi Taluka Belgaum district in the southwestern state of Karnataka, India.

== History ==
Shirgaonwadi is sub village of Shirgaon Gram Panchayat.

== Educational institutions ==
Govt. Primary school Shiragaonwadishirgaonwadi (Kannada Medium: 1st-7th standards education and Marathi Medium: 1st to 5th Standardsstandarad education.)

== Economy ==
Mostly dependent on agriculture. Tobacco, Betel Leaf and Sugarcane occupies in economy of Shiragaonwadi. Betel leaves are exported to various places across India such as Goa, Panjim, Nashik and Mumbai. Sugarcane sent to nearest sugar factories such as Venkateshwara Power Project Ltd. Bedkihal, Dudhaganga Krishna Sugar Factory, Nanadi and many other from nearest state Maharastra. Tobacco merchant and brokers from nearest tobacco market Nipani purchase tobacco from Shiragaonwadi and other villages.

Nowadays, textile industry seems to boom in the area New-Shiragaonwadi, as these villages are well connected by road to Maharashtra and Karnataka cities Ichalkaranji and Chikodi respectively.

Some of well known textile companies in the area are, VHM TEX INDIA, Maxima Fashion Exports, Bahubali Textiles and many new companies being established.

== Places ==
Majority of public transport in Shiragaonwadi connecting surrounding cities like Nippani, Inchalkarnji and Chikodi towns is through city buses run by North West Karnataka Road Transport Corporation (NWKRTC), Nowadays people using own vehicles like-bikes etc.
