= Godiabandha =

- Village
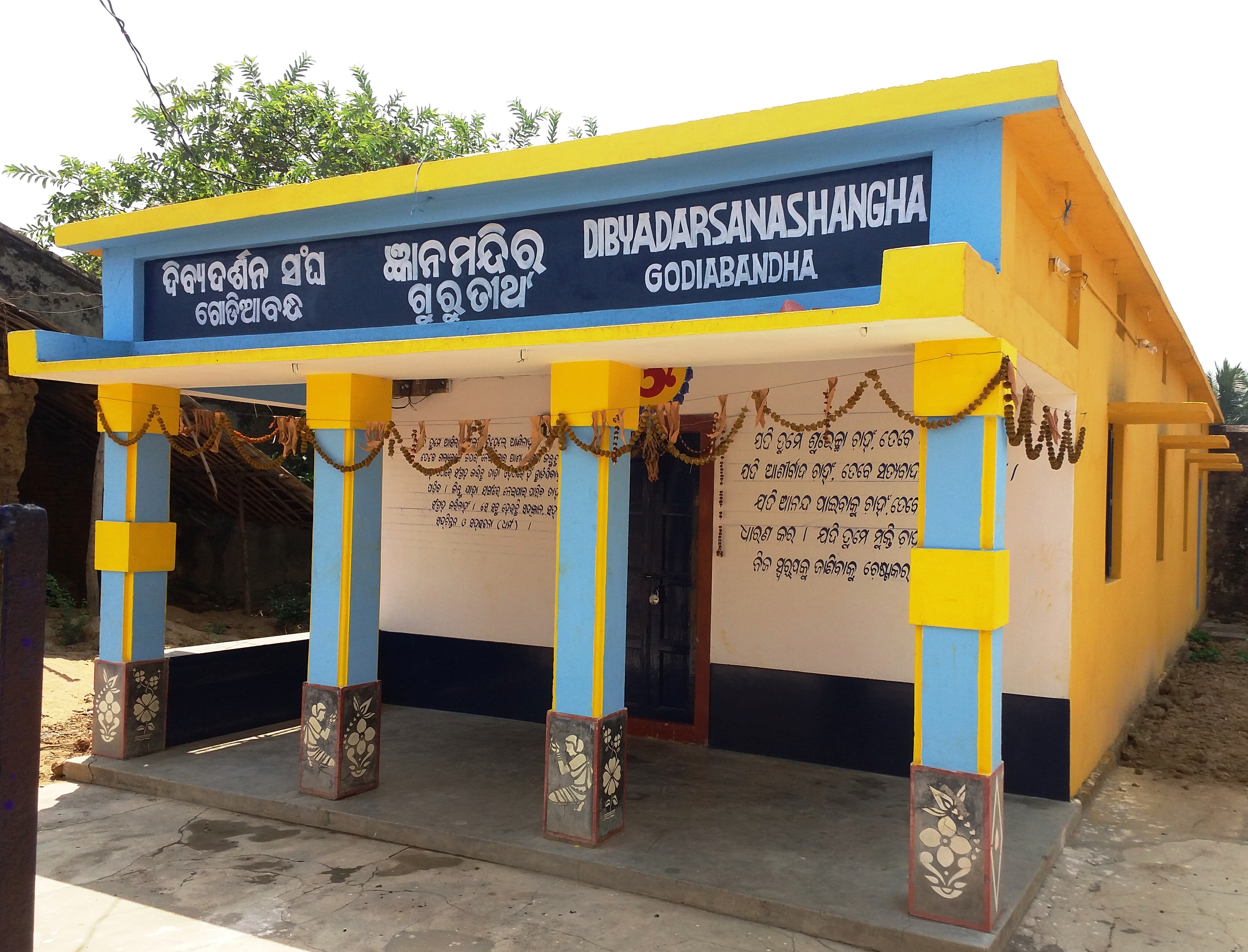
- Divya Darshan Ashram, Godiabandha

- Location in Odisha, India Godiabandha (India)
- Coordinates: 19°15′45″N 83°48′14″E
- Country: India
- State: Odisha
- District: Rayagada

Government
  - Type: Democratic
- Elevation: 91 m (299 ft)

Population (2011)
  - Total: 950

Languages
  - Official: Oriya
- Time zone: UTC+5:30 (IST)
- PIN: 765025
- Telephone code: 06862
- Vehicle registration: OD
- Website: odisha.gov.in

Godiabandha is a small village located in the Indian state of Odisha in the Rayagada district. Aga Soura of Godiabandha was one of the tribal activists who supported the bhoodan movement in Koraput district by forming bhoo samaj.

== Culture ==
It was the birthplace of Arjuna Gamang, the founder of Divyadarshan Sangh Dr.Giridhara Gamang (Ex-M.P. of I.N.C.), one of the former chief ministers of Odisha was born at Dibirisingi, a village very close to Godiabandha. Oriya and Telugu are the commonly used languages in the village. Most of the people are Hindus. The nearby villages of the area are populated with scheduled caste and scheduled tribe people like saura etc.

== Demography ==
Godiabandha village is about 51 km towards east of the district headquarters and 240 km away from the state capital Bhubaneswar. The total population of the village as per latest census report 2011 available in "Official website of census india" is 950 out of which the male population is 470 and the female population is 480 Godiabandha is located at 19°15′45″N 83°48′14″E. There is no direct rail or air communication to Gudiabandha. The nearest airport is Bhubaneswar and the nearest railway station is Gunupur. One can reach Gudiabandha via Rayagada by Odisha State Road Transport Corporation buses or private buses.

== Educational institutions ==
- Govt. Upgraded U.P School, Godiabandha
- Basantidevi Bidyapitha, Godiabandha
