= Vayu Vajra =

Indian public bus transportation service in Bengaluru

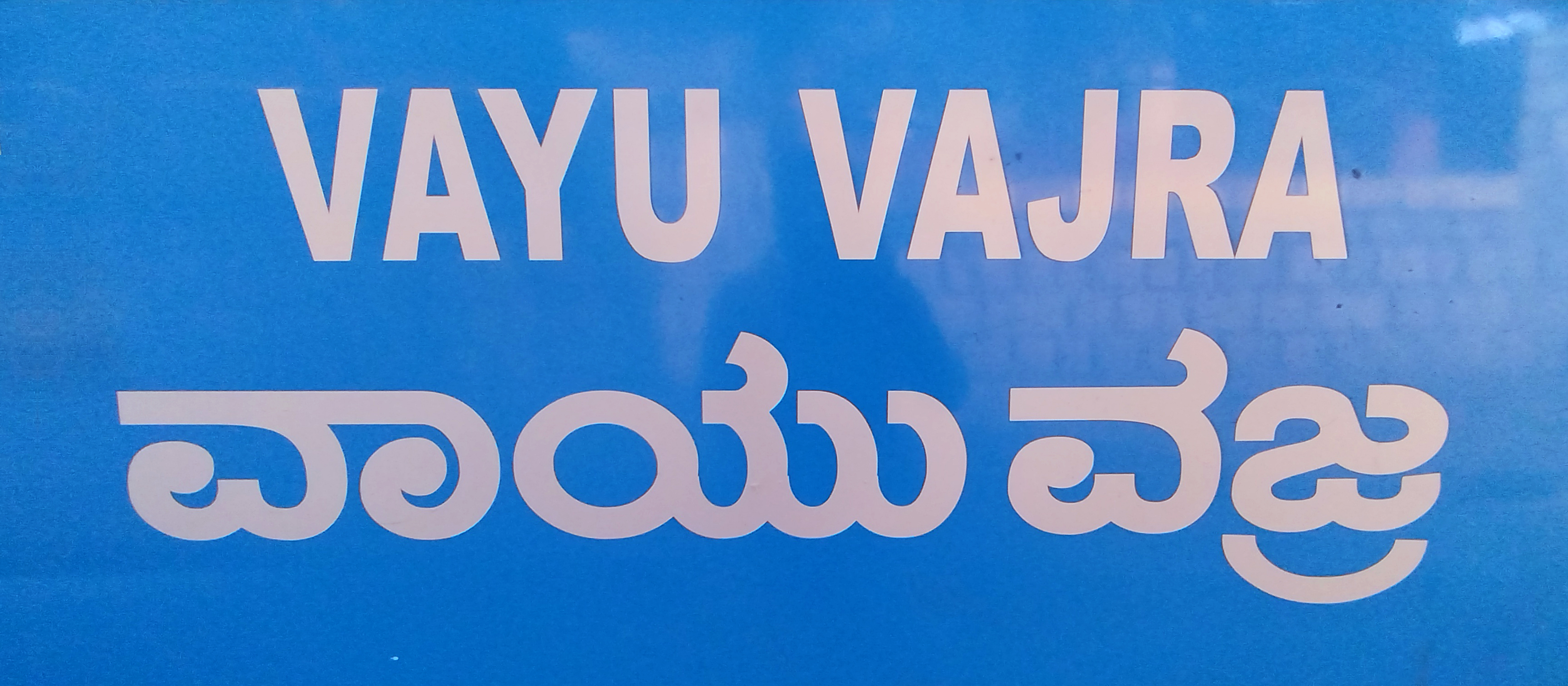

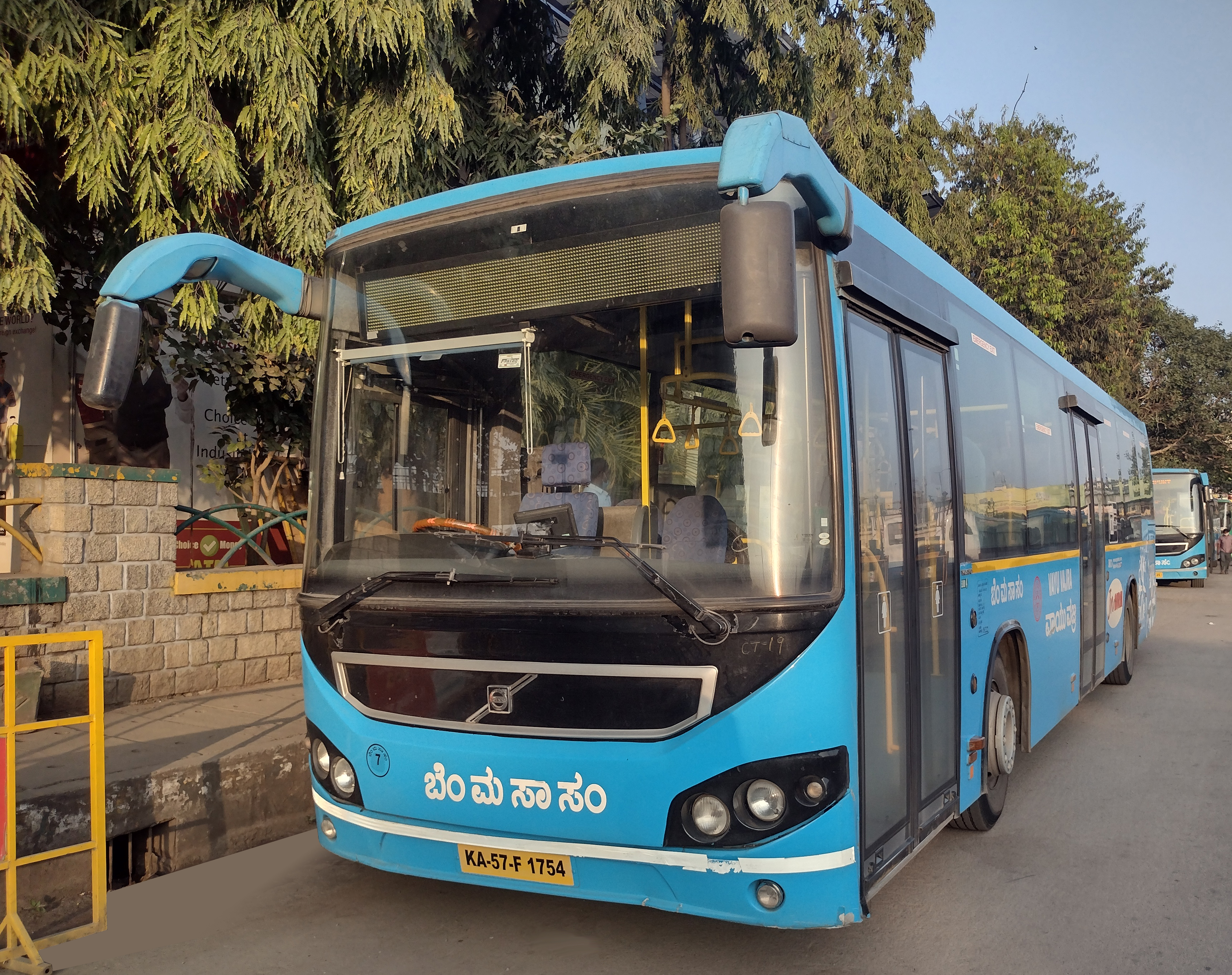
- Vayu Vajra bus in front of Kempegowda Bus Station, Majestic, Bengaluru
- Parent: Bangalore Metropolitan Transport Corporation
- Headquarters: Bengaluru, Karnataka, India
- Service area: Bengaluru
- Service type: AC Volvo,Switch bus
- Stops: Kempegowda International Airport
- Depots: Kamakya etc.
- Fuel type: Diesel,Electric
- Operator: Bangalore Metropolitan Transport Corporation
- Website: mybmtc.karnataka.gov.in/new-page/Airport+Vayu+vajra+Services/en

Vayu Vajra (transl. Air diamond) is a series of public bus owned by the Government of Karnataka's public road transport department BMTC, in Bengaluru, Karnataka, India. They are air conditioned Volvo buses colored blue. The buses carry people from the city centre to the Kempegowda International Airport, located in the suburban village of Devanahalli.

== Routes ==
=== Up Route ===
Serial number	Route number	Origin Place from City	Journey Time	Via
1	KIA-4	HAL Main Gate	1 hour 50 minutes	Jeevanbhima Nagar, Indiranagar Police Station/KFC, Halasuru, Coles Park, YMCA Nandi Durga Road, Jayachamarajendra Nagar, Mekhri Circle, Hebbal, Esteem Mall, Yelahanka Air Force, Sadahalli Gate
2	KIA-4A	Whitefield Bus Station (Vydehi Hospital)	2 hours	Graphite India, Kundalahalli Colony, AECS Layout Cross, Kundalahalli Gate, Marathahalli Bridge, HAL Main Gate, Jeevanbhima Nagar, Indiranagar Police Station/KFC, Halasuru, Coles Park, YMCA Nandi Durga Road, Jayachamarajendra Nagar, Mekhri Circle, Hebbal, Esteem Mall, Yelahanka Air Force, Sadahalli Gate
3	KIA-5	Banashankari TTMC	1 hour 50 minutes	JP Nagar 1st Phase, Indira Gandhi Circle, Marenahalli, Jayanagar 5th Block, Jayanagar TTMC, Ashoka Pillar, Wilson Garden, Shantinagar TTMC, Richmond Circle, Museum Road, Chinnaswamy Stadium, Cubbon Park Metro, Palace Guttahalli, Mekhri Circle, Hebbal, Esteem Mall, Yelahanka Air Force, Sadahalli Gate
4	KIA-5	Kamakhya (Depot 13)	2 hours	Kadirenahalli, Banashankari, JP Nagar 1st Phase, Indira Gandhi Circle, Marenahalli, Jayanagar 5th Block, Jayanagar TTMC, Ashoka Pillar, Wilson Garden, Shantinagar TTMC, Richmond Circle, Museum Road, Chinnaswamy Stadium, Cubbon Park Metro, Palace Guttahalli, Mekhri Circle, Hebbal, Esteem Mall, Yelahanka Air Force, Sadahalli Gate
5	KIA-5D	Art of Living Ashram	2 hours 20 minutes	Lakshmipura, Silk Institute Metro, Thalaghattapura, Vajarahalli, Doddakallasandra, Konanakunte Cross, Yelachenahalli, JP Nagar Metro, Banashankari, Sangam Circle, Jayanagar 40th Cross, Jayanagar TTMC, Ashoka Pillar, Wilson Garden, Shantinagar TTMC, Richmond Circle, Museum Road, Chinnaswamy Stadium, Cubbon Park Metro, Palace Guttahalli, Mekhri Circle, Hebbal, Esteem Mall, Yelahanka Air Force, Sadahalli Gate
6	KIA-6	Kadugodi	2 hours	Hope Farm, Whitefield Police Station, Varthur Kodi, Siddapura, Kundalahallli Gate, Marathahalli Bridge, Doddanekundi, EMC2, Mahadevapura Ring Road, KR Puram Railway Station, Tin Factory, Kasturi Nagar, Horamavu, Kalyan Nagar, Hennur Junction, Nagawara Junction, Hebbal, Esteem Mall, Yelahanka Air Force, Sadahalli Gate
7	KIA-6A	Kadugodi	2 hours	Hope Farm, ITPL, Hoodi, Garudacharpalya, Mahadevapura, KR Puram Railway Station, Tin Factory, Kasturi Nagar, Horamavu, Kalyan Nagar, Hennur Junction, Nagawara Junction, Hebbal, Esteem Mall, Yelahanka Air Force, Sadahalli Gate
8	KIA-6W	Whitefield Bus Station (Vydehi Hospital) (Depot 18)	2 hours	Graphite India, Kundalahalli Colony, AECS Layout Cross, Kundalahalli Gate, Marathahalli Bridge, Doddanekundi, EMC2, Mahadevapura Ring Road, KR Puram Railway Station, Tin Factory, Kasturi Nagar, Horamavu, Kalyan Nagar, Hennur Junction, Nagawara Junction, Hebbal, Esteem Mall, Yelahanka Air Force, Sadahalli Gate
9	KIA-7	HSR Layout KEB Junction	1 hour 50 minutes	HSR BDA Complex, Jakkasandra, Koramangala, Madiwala, Dairy Circle, Wilson Garden, Shantinagar TTMC, Richmond Circle, Richmond Circle, Museum Road, Chinnaswamy Stadium, Cubbon Park Metro, Palace Guttahalli, Mekhri Circle, Hebbal, Esteem Mall, Yelahanka Air Force, Sadahalli Gate
10	KIA-7A	HSR BDA Complex	1 hour 50 minutes	Jakkasandra, Koramangala, Sony Signal, Dell, Dommalur, Trinity Circle, Manipal Centre, Shivajinagar Bus Station, Balekundri Circle, Palace Guttahalli, Mekhri Circle, Hebbal, Esteem Mall, Yelahanka Air Force, Sadahalli Gate
11	KIA-7A	Agara (Depot 25)	2 hours	HSR BDA Complex, Jakkasandra, Koramangala, Sony Signal, Dell, Dommalur, Trinity Circle, Manipal Centre, Shivajinagar Bus Station, Balekundri Circle, Palace Guttahalli, Mekhri Circle, Hebbal, Esteem Mall, Yelahanka Air Force, Sadahalli Gate
10	KIA-8	Electronic City	2 hours	Electronic City NICE Road Junction, Hosa Road, Singasandra, Kudlu Gate, Bommanahalli, Central Silk Board, HSR BDA Complex, Agara Junction, Sarjapura Ring Road Junction, Bellandur, Eco Space, Kadubeesanahalli, Marathahalli Bridge (Kalamandira), Doddanekundi, EMC2, Mahadevapura Ring Road, KR Puram Railway Station, Tin Factory, Kasturi Nagar, Horamavu, Kalyan Nagar, Hennur Junction, Nagawara Junction, Hebbal, Esteem Mall, Yelahanka Air Force, Sadahalli Gate
11	KIA-8A	BTM Layout (Kuvempu Nagar Bus Terminus)	2 hours	Central Silk Board, HSR BDA Complex, Agara Junction, Sarjapura Ring Road Junction, Bellandur, Eco Space, Kadubeesanahalli, Marathahalli Bridge (Kalamandira), Doddanekundi, EMC2, Mahadevapura Ring Road, KR Puram Railway Station, Tin Factory, Kasturi Nagar, Horamavu, Kalyan Nagar, Hennur Junction, Nagawara Junction, Hebbal, Esteem Mall, Yelahanka Air Force, Sadahalli Gate
12	KIA-8B	Central Silk Board	2 hours	HSR BDA Complex, Agara Junction, Sarjapura Ring Road Junction, Bellandur, Eco Space, Kadubeesanahalli, Marathahalli Bridge (Kalamandira), Doddanekundi, EMC2, Mahadevapura Ring Road, KR Puram Railway Station, Tin Factory, Kasturi Nagar, Horamavu, Kalyan Nagar, Hennur Junction, Nagawara Junction, Hebbal, Esteem Mall, Yelahanka Air Force, Sadahalli Gate
13	KIA-8C	Chandapura	3 hours	Bommasandra, Hebbagodi, Huskur Gate, Electronic City, Electronic City NICE Road Junction, Hosa Road, Singasandra, Kudlu Gate, Bommanahalli, Central Silk Board, HSR BDA Complex, Agara Junction, Sarjapura Ring Road Junction, Bellandur, Eco Space, Kadubeesanahalli, Marathahalli Bridge (Kalamandira), Doddanekundi, EMC2, Mahadevapura Ring Road, KR Puram Railway Station, Tin Factory, Kasturi Nagar, Horamavu, Kalyan Nagar, Hennur Junction, Nagawara Junction, Hebbal, Esteem Mall, Yelahanka Air Force, Sadahalli Gate
14	KIA-8D	Sarjapura	2 hours	Sompura Gate, Dommasandra, Muttanallur Gate, Kodati Gate, Doddakannalli, Bellandur Gate, Sarjapura Ring Road Junction, Bellandur, Eco Space, Kadubeesanahalli, Marathahalli Bridge (Kalamandira), Doddanekundi, EMC2, Mahadevapura Ring Road, KR Puram Railway Station, Tin Factory, Kasturi Nagar, Horamavu, Kalyan Nagar, Hennur Junction, Nagawara Junction, Hebbal, Esteem Mall, Yelahanka Air Force, Sadahalli Gate
15	KIA-8E	Electronic City Wipro Back Gate	2 hours 10 minutes	Electronic City Phase 1, Electronic City NICE Road Junction, Hosa Road, Singasandra, Kudlu Gate, Bommanahalli, Central Silk Board, HSR BDA Complex, Agara Junction, Sarjapura Ring Road Junction, Bellandur, Eco Space, Kadubeesanahalli, Marathahalli Bridge (Kalamandira), Doddanekundi, EMC2, Mahadevapura Ring Road, KR Puram Railway Station, Tin Factory, Kasturi Nagar, Horamavu, Kalyan Nagar, Hennur Junction, Byrathi, Bagalur, Begur
16	KIA-8EW	Electronic City Wipro Gate	2 hours 10 minutes	Electronic City Phase 1, Electronic City NICE Road Junction, Hosa Road, Singasandra, Kudlu Gate, Bommanahalli, Central Silk Board, HSR BDA Complex, Agara Junction, Sarjapura Ring Road Junction, Bellandur, Eco Space, Kadubeesanahalli, Marathahalli Bridge (Kalamandira), Doddanekundi, EMC2, Mahadevapura Ring Road, KR Puram Railway Station, Tin Factory, Kasturi Nagar, Horamavu, Kalyan Nagar, Hennur Junction, Nagawara Junction, Hebbal, Esteem Mall, Yelahanka Air Force, Sadahalli Gate
17	KIA-8H	Attibelle	3 hours	Indlabele, Bidaraguppe, Billapura, Sarjapura, Sompura Gate, Dommasandra, Muttanallur Gate, Kodati Gate, Doddakannalli, Bellandur Gate, Sarjapura Ring Road Junction, Bellandur, Eco Space, Kadubeesanahalli, Marathahalli Bridge (Kalamandira), Doddanekundi, EMC2, Mahadevapura Ring Road, KR Puram Railway Station, Tin Factory, Kasturi Nagar, Horamavu, Kalyan Nagar, Hennur Junction, Nagawara Junction, Hebbal, Esteem Mall, Yelahanka Air Force, Sadahalli Gate
18	KIA-9	Kempegowda Bus Station (Majestic)	1 hour	Shivananda Stores, Palace Guttahalli, Mekhri Circle, Hebbal, Esteem Mall, Yelahanka Air Force, Hunasamaranahalli, Chikkajala, Sadahalli Gate
19	KIA-9H	Hebbala	1 hour	Esteem Mall, Kodigehalli, Jakkur Cross, Yelahanka Air Force, Hunasamaranahalli, Chikkajala, Sadahalli Gate
20	KIA-10	Mysuru Road Satellite Bus Station	1 hour 45 minutes	Attiguppe, Vijayanagar TTMC, Rajajinagar, Sandal Soap Factory Metro, Yeshwanthpura TTMC, Mekhri Circle, Hebbal, Esteem Mall, Yelahanka Air Force, Sadahalli Gate
21	KIA-14	Royal Meenakshi Mall (Hulimavu Cross)	1 hour 50 minutes	Hulimavu Gate, Bilekahalli, Jaya Prakash Nagar 3rd Phase, Jayadeva Hospital, Tavarekere Metro, Dairy Circle, Wilson Garden, Shantinagar TTMC, Richmond Circle, Richmond Circle, Museum Road, Chinnaswamy Stadium, Cubbon Park Metro, Palace Guttahalli, Mekhri Circle, Hebbal, Esteem Mall, Yelahanka Air Force, Sadahalli Gate
22	KIA-14A	Jigani APC Circle	2 hours 15 minutes	Koppa Gate, Bannerughatta, Kalkere, Basavanapura, Gottigere, Kalena Agrahara, Royal Meenakshi Mall (Hulimavu Cross), Hulimavu Gate, Bilekahalli, Jaya Prakash Nagar 3rd Phase, Jayadeva Hospital, Tavarekere Metro, Dairy Circle, Wilson Garden, Shantinagar TTMC, Richmond Circle, Richmond Circle, Museum Road, Chinnaswamy Stadium, Cubbon Park Metro, Palace Guttahalli, Mekhri Circle, Hebbal, Esteem Mall, Yelahanka Air Force, Sadahalli Gate
23	KIA-15	Whitefield Bus Station (Vydehi Hospital)	1 hour 45 minutes	Sathya Sai Hospital, ITPL, Hope Farm, Kadugodi, Belathur, Seegehalli, Katamanallur Gate, Mandur, Budigere, Singahalli, Begur
24	KIA-15A	Whitefield Bus Station (Vydehi Hospital)	2 hours	Graphite India, Kundalahalli Colony, AECS Layout Cross, Kundalahalli Gate, Siddapura, Varthur Kodi, Whitefield Police Station, Hope Farm, Kadugodi, Belathur, Seegehalli, Katamanallur Gate, Mandur, Budigere, Singahalli, Begur

=== Down Route ===
Serial Number	Route number	Terminus	Journey Time	Via
1	KIA-6	Kadugodi	2 hours	Sadahalli Gate, Chikkajala, Yelahanka Air Force, Esteem Mall, Hebbal, Mekhri Circle, Jayachamarajendra Nagar, Nandidurga Road, Coles Park, Trinity Circle, Dommalur, HAL Main Gate, Marathahalli Bridge, Kundalahalli Gate, Siddapura, Varthur Kodi, Whitefield Police Station, Hope Farm

== Gallery ==
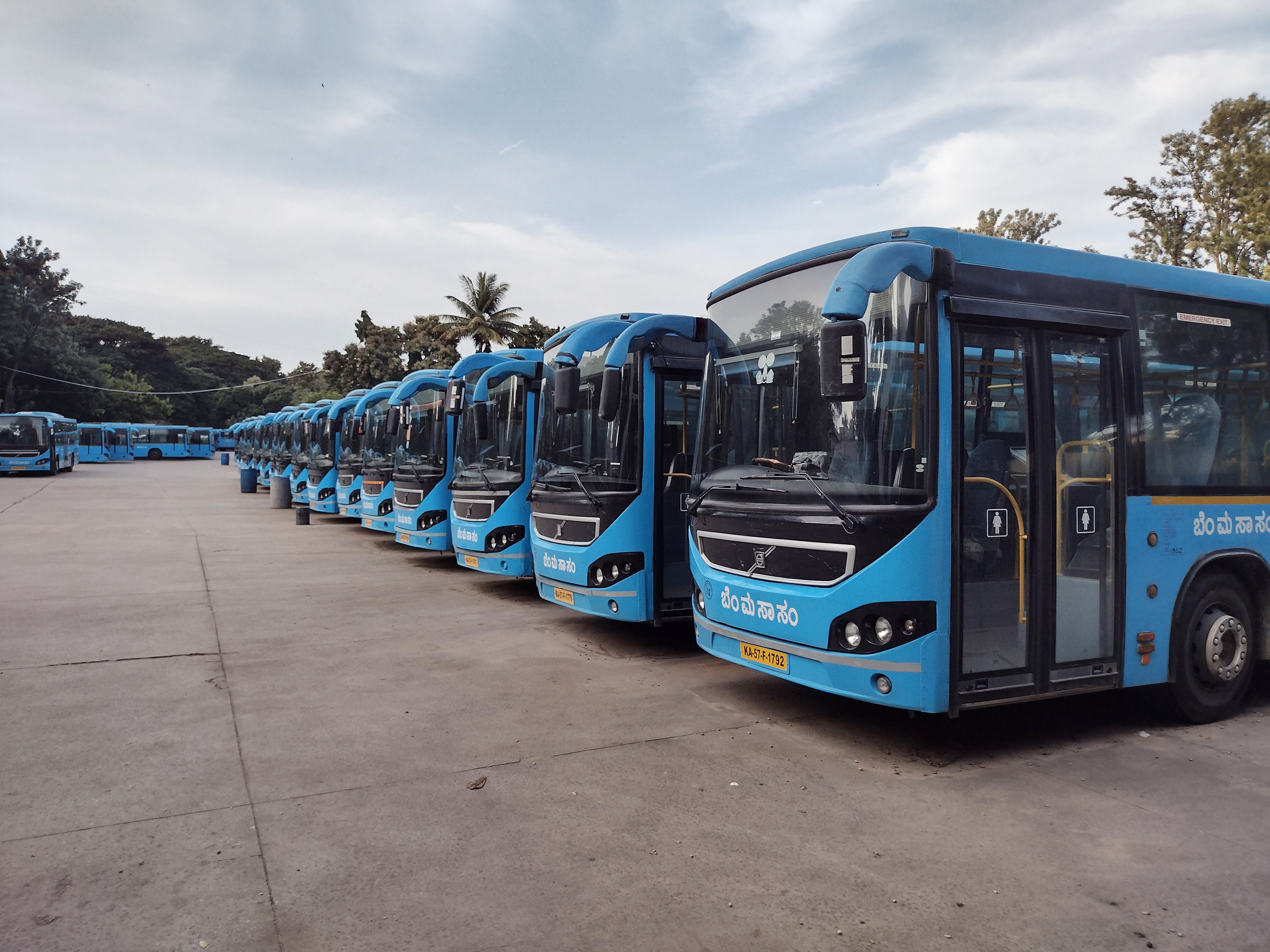
Vayu Vajra buses in bus depot 13, Kamakya, Bengaluru

KIA-10 Vayu Vajra in Mysuru Road Bus Station

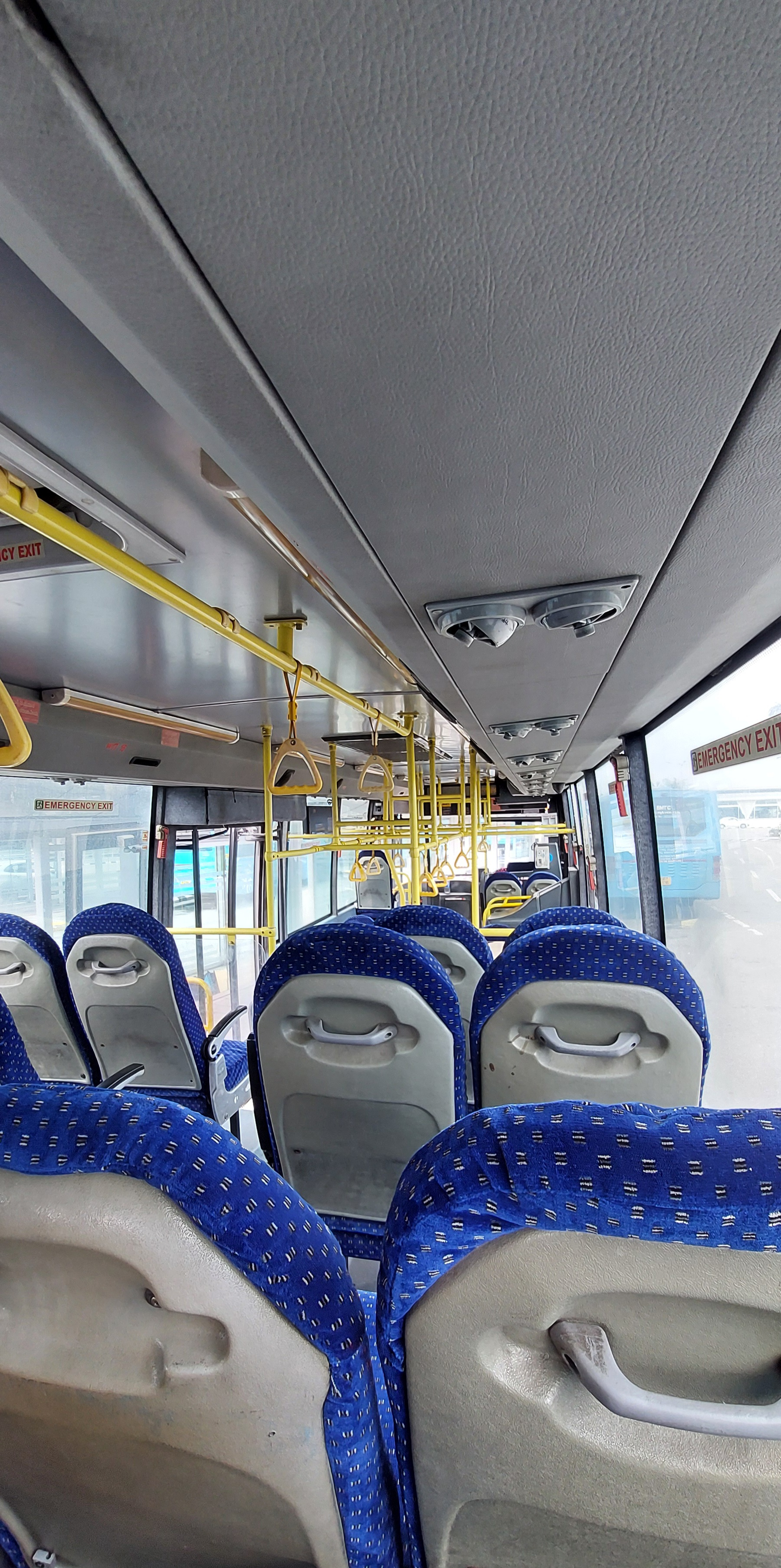
Interior of a Vayu Vajra bus

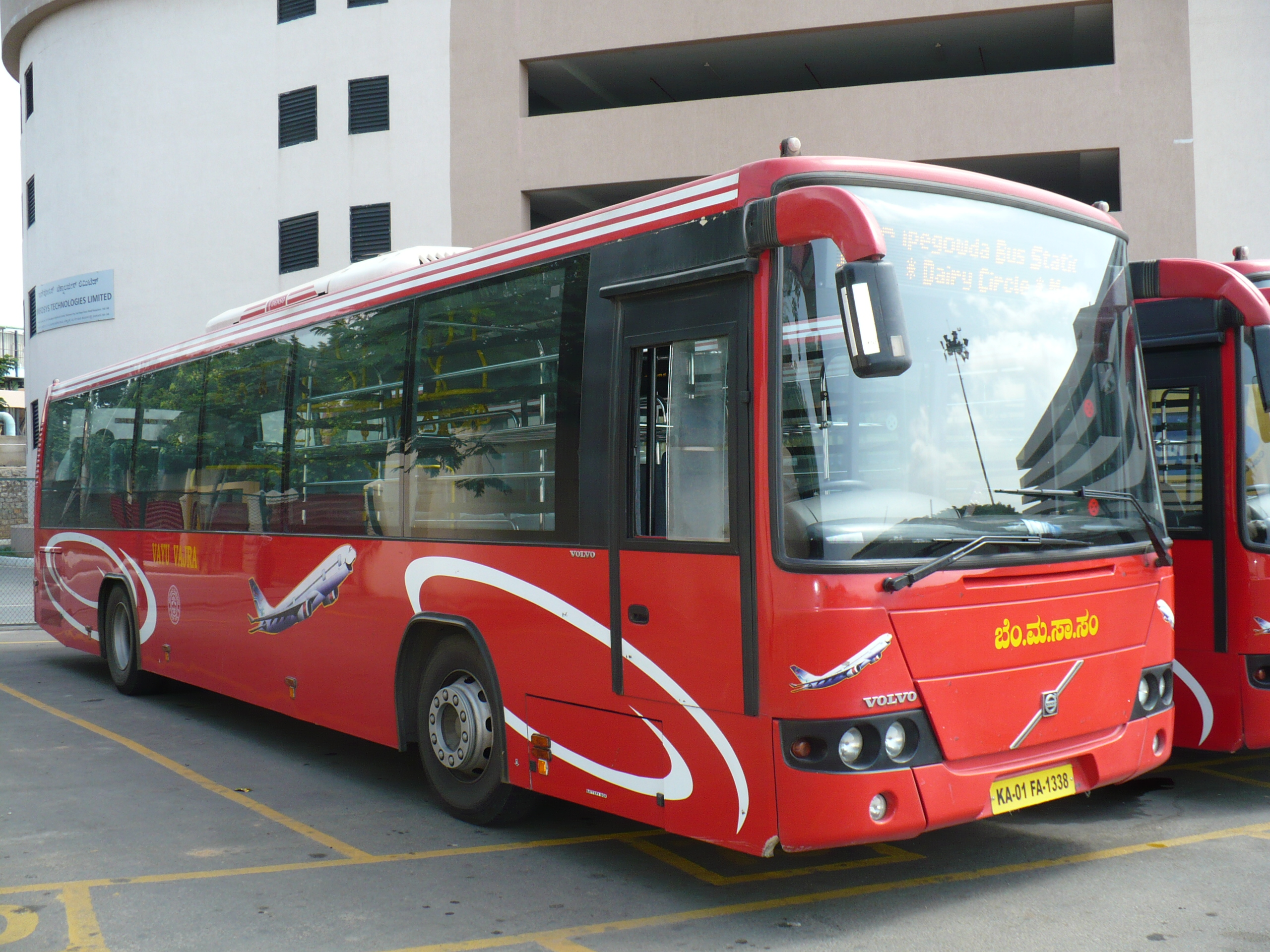
Old Vayu Vajra bus
