= Volvo 9600 =

Intercity coach manufactured by Volvo

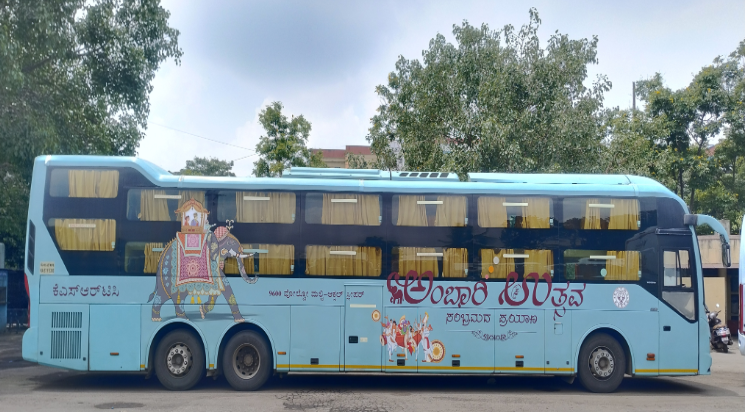
- KSRTC's Volvo 9600 Sleeper Bus

Overview
- Manufacturer: Volvo
- Production: 2022–present
- Assembly: Bengaluru, India

Body and chassis
- Class: Commercial vehicle
- Body style: Coach
- Floor type: Step entrance
- Chassis: B8R

Powertrain
- Engine: D8K
- Power output: 350hp
- Transmission: 6-speed manual; 12-speed semi-automatic

Dimensions
- Length: 12.2–15.0 m
- Width: 2.6 m
- Height: Seater: 3.8 m Sleeper: 4.0 m
- Curb weight: 22,200 kilograms (48,900 lb)

Chronology
- Predecessor: Volvo 9400

The Volvo 9600 is an intercity coach manufactured by Volvo, primarily for the Indian market.

The 9600 was launched in 2022 as a replacement for the Volvo 9400. Its design is based on the fourth generation Volvo 9700.

== Variants ==
The 9600 range consists of a 12.2 bi-axle seater variant, bi-axle 13.5m sleeper and seater variants, and tri-axle 15m seater and sleeper variants, all on the B8R chassis.

== Operators ==
The bus is operated by state transport corporations of Kerala, Karnataka, Gujarat Odisha, and Tamil Nadu as well as various private operators like Vijayanand Travels.
