= Mahadeshwarabetta =

- village
- Location in Karnataka, India Mahadeshwarabetta (India)
- Coordinates: 12.15°N 77.10°E
- Country: India
- State: Karnataka
- District: Chamarajanagar
- Talukas: Hanur

Government
  - Body: Gram panchayat

Population (2001)
  - Total: 10,676

Languages
  - Official: Kannada
- Time zone: UTC+5:30 (IST)

Mahadeshwarabetta is a village in the southern state of Karnataka, India. It is located in the Hanur taluk of Chamarajanagar district.

== Demographics ==
As of 2001 India census, Mahadeshwarabetta had a population of 10,676 (5,518 males and 5,158 females).

== See also ==
- Chamarajanagar
- Districts of Karnataka
