= Nagara Sarige =

Public bus service in India

Nagara Sarige ನಾಗರ ಸರಿಗೆ
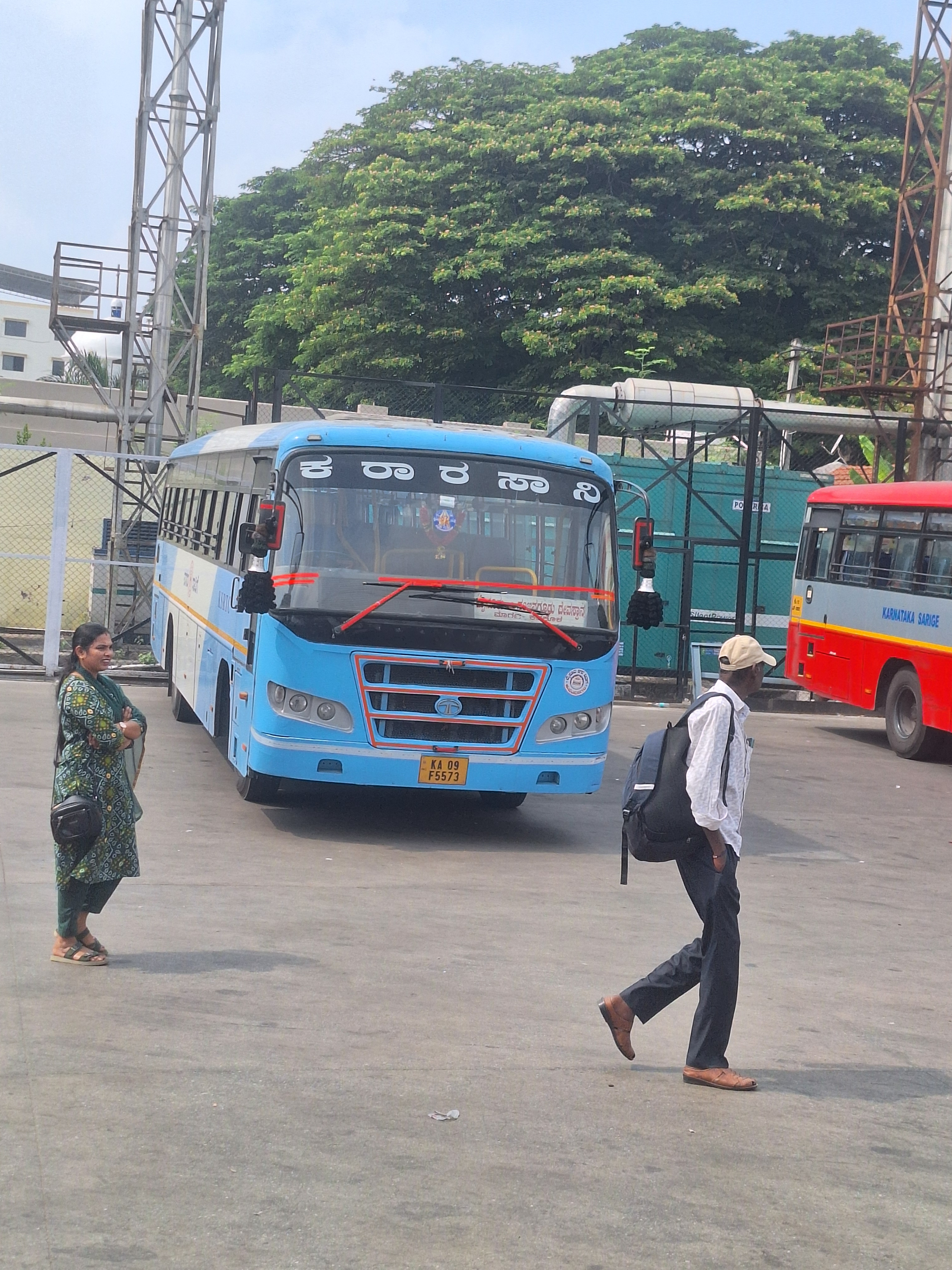
- New livery Nagara Sarige Bus at Mysuru Sub Urban Bus Station
- Parent: Karnataka State Road Transport Corporation
- Locale: Dakshina Karnataka
- Service area: Cities in southern Karnataka except Bengaluru
- Service type: Urban
- Fleet: 2,149
- Operator: Karnataka State Road Transport Corporation(underGovernment of Karnataka)

Nagara Sarige(City Buses in Kannada) is a city public transport bus service in cities of Dakshina Karnataka(Southern Karnataka), in Karnataka, India.

It is operated by the Karnataka State Road Transport Corporation.

== Description ==
It is a series of non-ac low floor city bus service which is served in cities of southern Karnataka except for Bengaluru(Which is served by BMTC).

Old Livery consists of Dark Pink and White colour New Livery after Shakti scheme consists of light blue and white

Most of this Bus service can be found in cities like Mysore,Mangalore,Tumakuru,Davangere etc.

== Welfares and Schemes ==
=== 'Shakti Scheme' Free Bus Service for women ===
'Shakti Scheme' was announced by the Second Siddaramaiah ministry on 2 June 2023. It started on 11 June 2023, providing free-of-charge bus service to Karnataka-domiciled women. Beneficiaries show their government-issued photo identity and address proof for the first three months. Bus conductors issue them zero-fare tickets. Thereafter, beneficiaries obtain Shakti smartcards (named after the name of the scheme) through an application submitted via the government's Seva Sindhu website.

==== Terms and conditions of the scheme ====
- The scheme will apply to all four Road Transport Corporations in the state (KSRTC, BMTC, NWKRTC and KKRTC).
- Nagara Sarige services is part of this scheme.
- Women can travel for free only on bus services within the state. Bus services to destinations outside Karnataka will be outside the scheme's purview even if women travel within the state. For example, a woman travelling to Mangaluru in Karnataka i.e., within the state on an Udupi-Kasaragod bus service which is an interstate service to Kasaragod in neighbouring Kerala, will have to buy a ticket.
- The scheme will not apply to luxury buses (Rajahamsa Executive Class, Airavat Class, Airavat Club Class, Pallakki Class, Ambaari Class, Ambaari Dream Class, Ambaari Utsav Class, Flybus, EV- Power Plus+ services).
- Half of the seats on KSRTC ordinary and express buses will be reserved for men. Luxury, AC and interstate buses as well as BMTC buses will be exempted from this.
- The government will reimburse the KSRTC based on the distance women travel.

=== Free Bus passes for Students ===
In June 2026 Karnataka government under the chief ministry of D.K. Shivakumar announced free buses for students studying in karnataka from primary school to postgraduate level and border areas within 20 km of karnataka border.It is free for both boys and girls.

- Nagara Sarige is part of this Scheme.

== Gallery ==
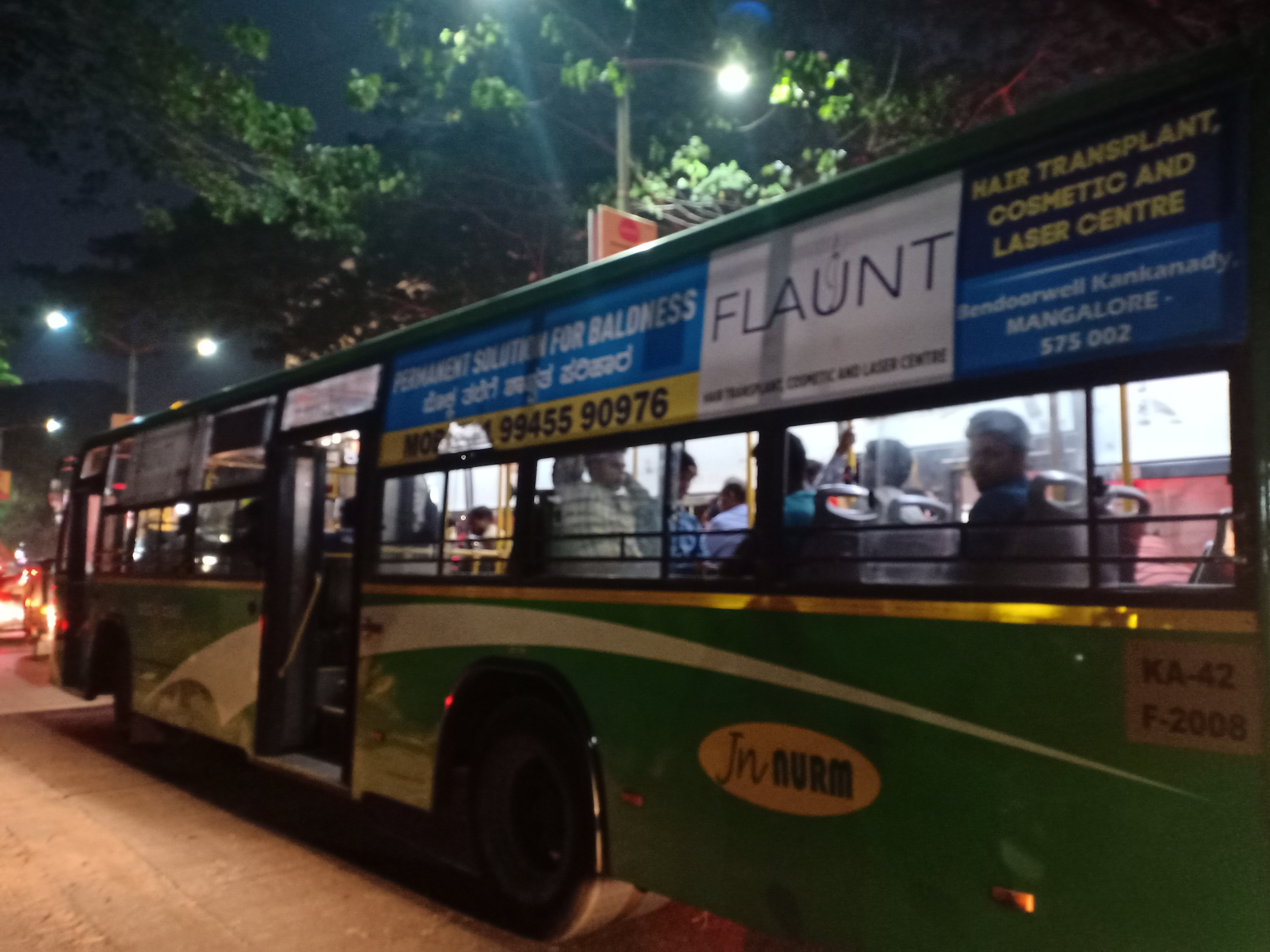
KSRTC Jnnurm green city bus at M G Road in Mangalore

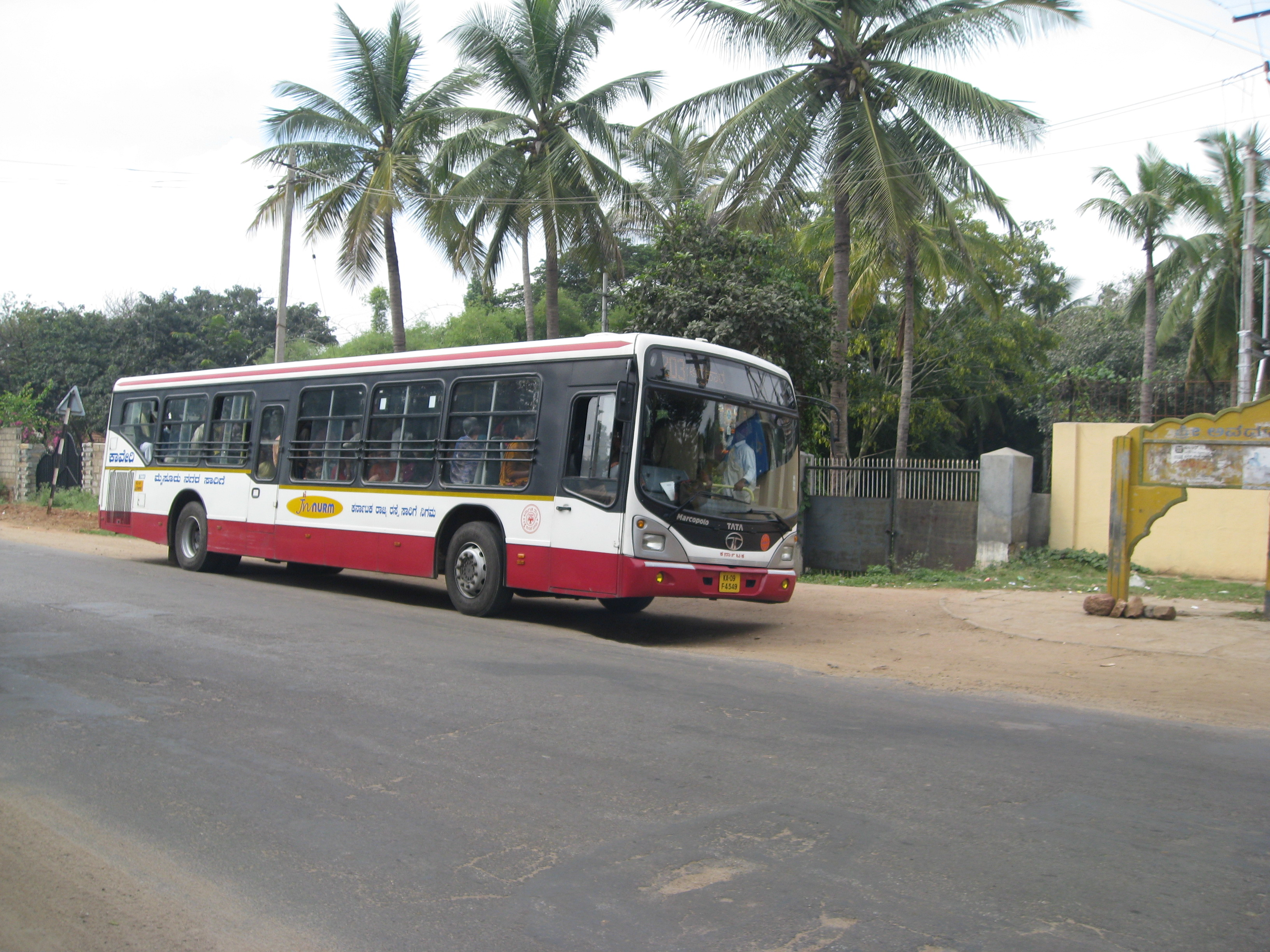
KSRTC-MCTC-Bus

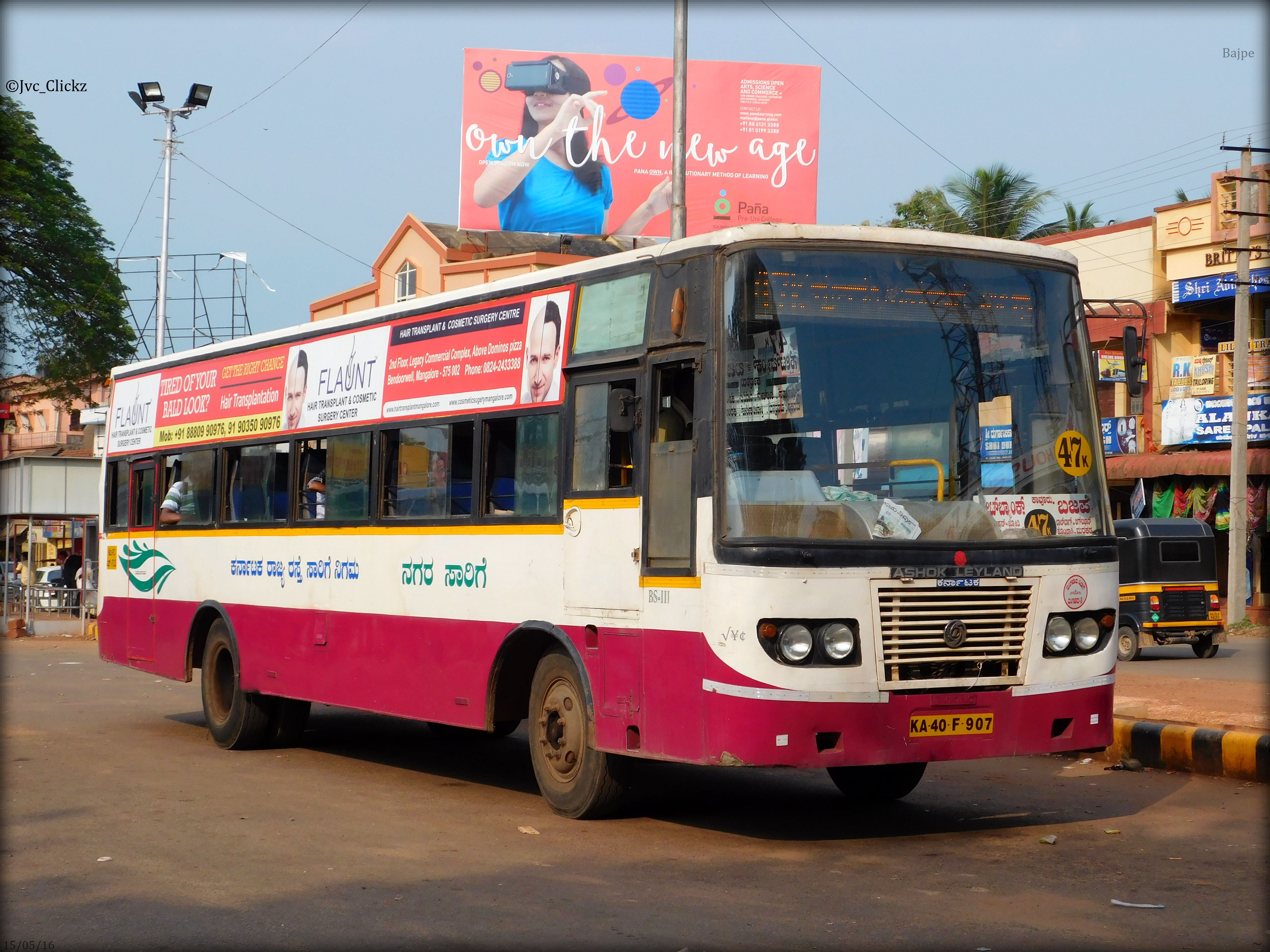
Old Livery Nagara Sarige

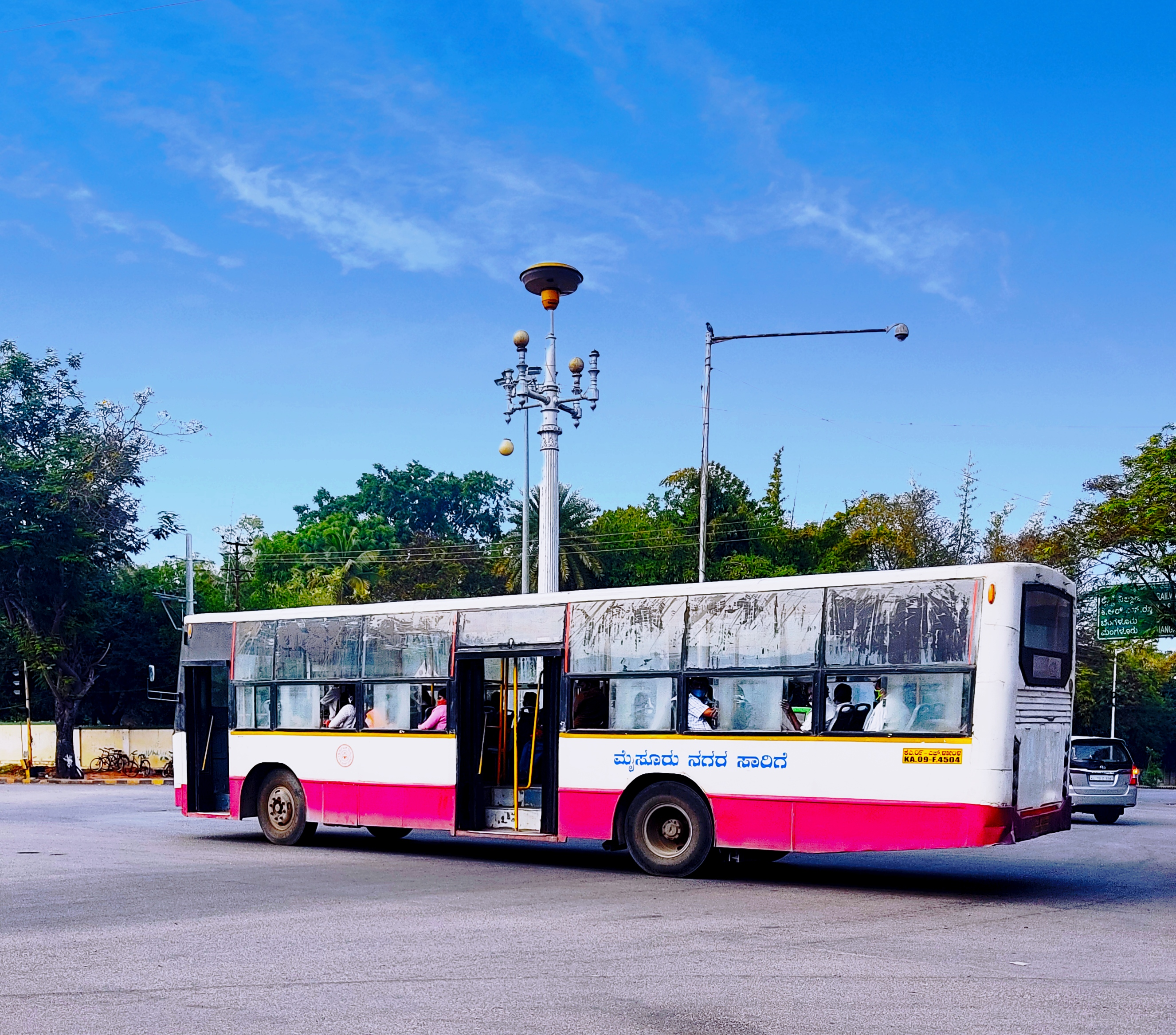
City bus in Mysore

== See also ==
- Karnataka Sarige
- List of bus stations in Karnataka
