= Karnataka State Road Transport Corporation =

Transport corporation of Karnataka

- Native name: Karnataka Rajya Raste Sarige Nigama
- Formerly: Mysore Government Road Transport Department (1948–1961); Mysore State Road Transport Corporation (1961–1973)
- Type: Public
- Industry: Public transport bus service
- Predecessor: Mysore Government Road Transport Department
- Founded: 12 September 1948 (78 years ago); as Mysore Government Road Transport Department; 1 August 1961 (65 years ago); renamed as Mysore State Road Transport Corporation; 1 November 1973 (52 years ago); renamed as Karnataka State Road Transport Corporation
- Headquarters: KSRTC Central Office, Sarige Sadana, Kengal Hanumanthaiah Road, Shantinagara, Bengaluru, Bengaluru Urban, Karnataka, India
- Number of locations: 85 Depots; 181 Bus Stations; KSRTC Central Office, Shantinagara, Bengaluru; Regional Workshop, Kengeri, Bengaluru; Regional Workshop, Hassan; Central Training Institute, Bengaluru; 4 Regional Training Institutes, including Malavalli, Mandya district and Hassan; KSRTC Printing Press, Shantinagara, Bengaluru; KSRTC Hospital, Jayanagara 4th Block, Bengaluru
- Area served: Primary Base: Bengaluru Urban; Bengaluru Rural; Ramanagara; Kolar; Chikkaballapura; Tumkur; Chitradurga; Davanagere; Shimoga; Mangaluru; Udupi; Chikmagalur; Hassan; Mysore; Mandya; Chamarajanagara; Kodagu; Intrastate: Dharwada; Uttara Kannada; Belagavi; Gadag; Bagalkot; Haveri; Kalaburagi; Bijapur; Bidar; Yadgir; Raichur; Koppal; Bellari; Vijayanagara; Interstate: Tamil Nadu; Kerala; Andhra Pradesh; Telangana; Maharashtra; Goa; Puducherry
- Key people: S R Srinivasa (Vasu), MLA Chairperson; Mohammed Rizwan Nawab Vice-Chairman; Sivakumar K B, IAS Managing Director; B. S. Suresha (Byrathi), MLA Minister for Transport, Government of Karnataka; Deepa Cholan, IAS Secretary to Government, Department of Transport; Reju M. T., IAS Secretary to Government (Budget & Resources), Department of Finance; Gayithri K M, IAS Director (Personnel & Vigilance); Paresh Kumar Goel, ISDE Director (Transport), Ministry of Road Transport & Highways, Central Govt. Representative; Rajendra Cholan, IAS Metropolitan Commissioner, BMRDA, Invitee (Official)
- Brands: Karnataka Sarige; Gramantara Sarige; Nagara Sarige; Samparka Sarige; Ashwamedha Classic Class; Rajahamsa Executive Class; Pallakki Class; Airavat Class; Airavat Club Class; Airavat Club Class 2.0; Ambaari Class; Ambaari Dream Class; Ambaari Utsav Class; Flybus; EV-PowerPower+
- Services: Public transport
- Revenue: ₹151,561,000 (US$1.6 million) per day
- Owner: Government of Karnataka
- Number of employees: 33259 (2026)
- Parent: Department of Transport, Government of Karnataka
- Divisions: 1 bus station division: Kempegowda Bus Station; 17 operating divisions: Bengaluru Central; Bengaluru South; Tumkur; Madhugiri (from 1 June 2026); Kolar; Chikkaballapura; Mysore Urban; Mysore District Rural; Mandya; Chamarajanagara; Hassan; Chikmagalur; Mangaluru; Puttur; Davanagere; Shimoga; Chitradurga
- Subsidiaries: Bengaluru Metropolitan Transport Corporation; Kalyana Karnataka Road Transport Corporation; North Western Karnataka Road Transport Corporation
- Website: KSRTC Main Website; Online Reservation; Namma Cargo Logistics and Parcel Services
- Footnotes; 8,891 vehicles serve 35.56 lakh passengers per day

The Karnataka State Road Transport Corporation (KSRTC) is a state-owned public road transport corporation in the Indian state of Karnataka. It is wholly owned by the Government of Karnataka. It serves routes within Karnataka and connects the state to Tamil Nadu, Kerala, Telangana, Andhra Pradesh, Maharashtra, Goa and the Union territory of Puducherry. According to the corporation, it operates a fleet of 8,891 vehicles, including 48 electric buses, and carries about 35.56 lakh passengers per day.

The acronym KSRTC is also used by the Kerala State Road Transport Corporation, and the two corporations have disputed its use. In June 2021, Deccan Herald reported that Karnataka retained the legal right to use the abbreviation.

== History ==
=== Foundation ===
Mysore Government Road Transport Department was inaugurated on 12 September 1948 with 120 buses. The transport department of The Mysore state administered it until 1961.

=== Corporatization ===
It was subsequently converted into an independent corporation under Section 3 of the Road Transport Corporation Act, 1950 on 1 August 1961, In 1961, after successfully converting into an independent corporation all assets and liabilities of MGRTD were transferred to Mysore State Road Transport Corporation.

=== Merger ===
On 1 October 1961, Bangalore Transport Service was merged with it.

=== Renaming ===
On 1 November 1973, the Mysore state was renamed as Karnataka, thus Karnataka State Road Transport Corporation.

=== Bifurcation ===
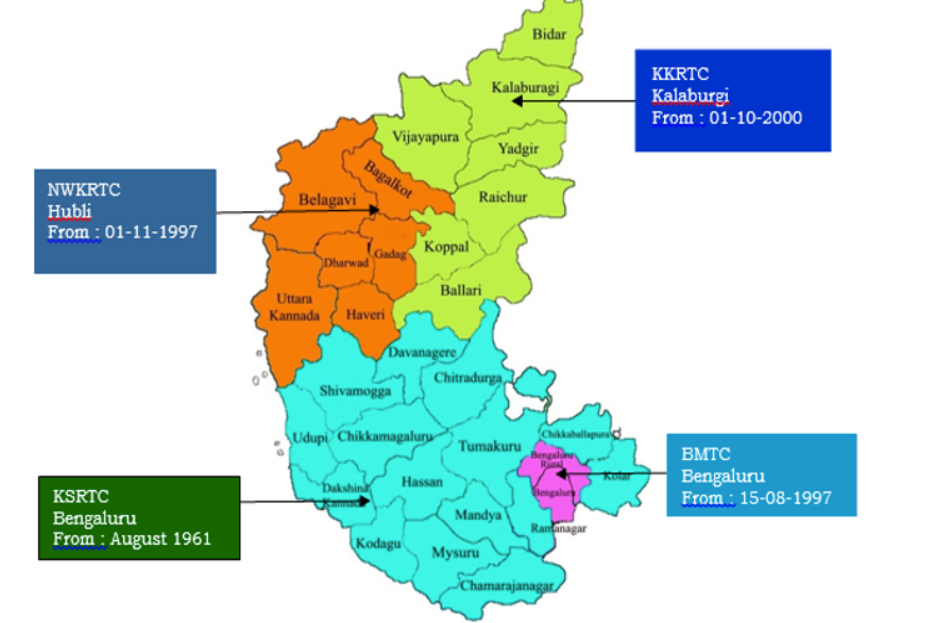

- On 15 August 1997, Bangalore Metropolitan Transport Corporation was bifurcated to cater to the transportation needs of Bangalore Metropolitan Region. It was formed by separating the Bangalore Transport Service.
- On 1 November 1997, North Western Karnataka Road Transport Corporation was bifurcated to cater to the transportation needs of Northwestern parts of Karnataka.
- On 15 August 2000, Kalyana Karnataka Road Transport Corporation (then North Eastern Karnataka Road Transport Corporation) was bifurcated to cater to the transportation needs of northeastern parts of Karnataka. This left the corporation to serve the southern part of Karnataka.
- On 23 November 2009, Bijapur(Vijayapura) division was transferred from NWKRTC to KKRTC.
- On 1 January 2024, Mysore Division was split into Mysore City Transport and Mysore Rural divisions.
- On 1 June 2026, the new Madhugiri Division began functioning.

== Destination ==
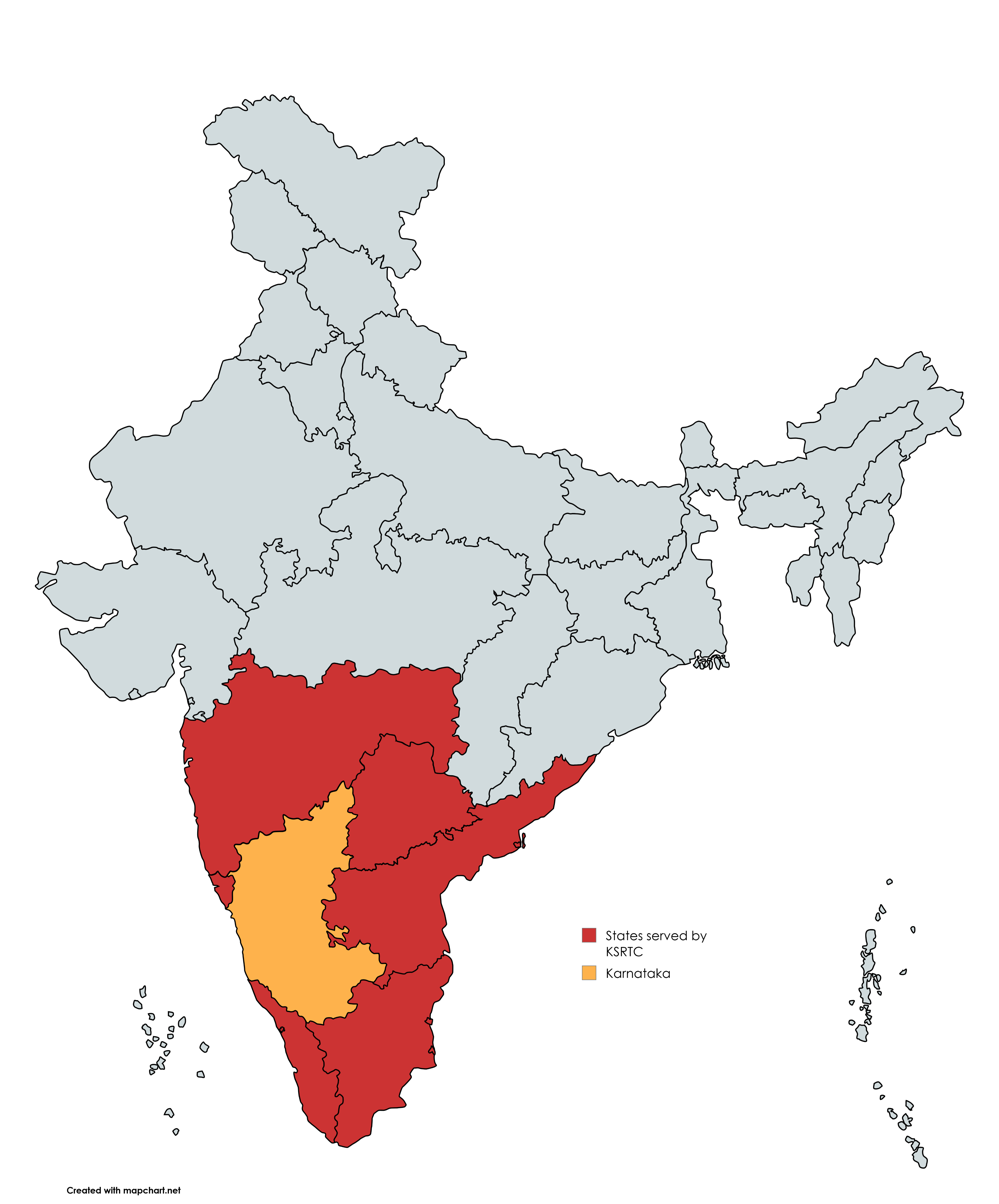

It serves routes to all 31 districts in Karnataka and as well as to towns and cities in the southern part of Karnataka and connects it to the rest of the state and the states of Tamil Nadu, Kerala, Telangana, Andhra Pradesh, Maharashtra, Goa and the Union territory of Puducherry.

== Fleet ==
As of 2026, KSRTC reported a fleet of 8,891 vehicles, including 48 electric buses, running 8,317 schedules and about 30.73 lakh effective kilometres per day. The corporation started operating electric buses under the "EV Power Plus" brand on a gross cost contract model from 16 January 2023.

For comparison, KSRTC's mechanical engineering department recorded a fleet of 8,199 vehicles on 18 June 2022: 3,885 Ashok Leyland, 2,499 Tata, 1,291 Eicher, 376 Volvo, 75 Scania, 48 Corona and 25 Mercedes-Benz.

== Services ==
Name of the Service	Description	Manufacturer	Gallery
Karnataka Sarige	It is a non-AC bus service with 3+2 non-reclining seats built on bi-axle Ashok Leyland, Tata and Eicher suburban chassis with a durangi livery of two colours consisting of silver and red colours. It is an interdistrict, interstate service in Dakshina Karnataka (Southern Karnataka).	Ashok Leyland; Tata; Eicher	Image of KSRTC Sarige buses. Top one is Eicher and the bottom one is Ashok Leyland (Both are BSVI). Both images are taken from KSRTC's website.
Gramantara Sarige	It is a non-AC bus service with 3+2 non-reclining seats built on bi-axle Ashok Leyland, Tata and Eicher suburban chassis with a durangi livery of two colours consisting of blue and white colours and orange colour at some parts. It is a service to connect villages to nearby cities and towns in Dakshina Karnataka (Southern Karnataka).	Ashok Leyland; Tata; Eicher	KSRTC Gramantara Sarige at Statebank bus stand, Mangalore
Nagara Sarige	It is a non-AC bus service with 2+2 non-reclining seats built on bi-axle Ashok Leyland, Tata and Eicher urban chassis with various liveries depending upon the locale. It is an intracity and town service in Dakshina Karnataka (Southern Karnataka) except for Bangalore. Bangalore Metropolitan Region is served by Bangalore Metropolitan Transport Corporation	Ashok Leyland; Tata; Eicher	Old Livery New Livery
Samparka Sarige	It is a non-AC bus service with 2+2 non-reclining seats built on bi-axle Ashok Leyland, Tata and Eicher with white-pink livery. It is a shuttle bus service between Kempegowda Bus Station and Mysuru Road Bus Station in Bengaluru.	Ashok Leyland; Tata Motors; Eicher Motors	Samparka Sarige at Mysore Road Bus Station
Ashwamedha Classic Class	It is a non-AC bus service with 3+2 non-reclining seats with more comfort than Karnataka Sarige built on bi-axle Ashok Leyland suburban chassis with a durangi livery of two colours consisting of silver and red colours. It is an interdistrict, interstate point-to-point service in Dakshina Karnataka (Southern Karnataka).	Ashok Leyland	Ashwamedha Classic bus at Kempegowda Bus Station Terminal 2A
Rajahamsa Executive Class	It is a non-AC ultra-deluxe bus service with 2+2 reclining seats built on bi-axle Ashok Leyland, Tata and Eicher chassis with a white livery. It is a long-distance service operating out of Dakshina Karnataka (Southern Karnataka).	Ashok Leyland; Tata Motors; Eicher Motors	KSRTC'S Non-Ac Ultra deluxe semi-sleeper Rajahamsa Executive Class bus
Non-AC Sleeper Class	It is a non-AC ultra-deluxe bus service with 2+1 lower and upper berth sleeper seats built on bi-axle Ashok Leyland, Tata and Eicher chassis with a white livery. It is a long-distance service operating out of Dakshina Karnataka (Southern Karnataka).	Ashok Leyland; Tata Motors; Eicher Motors	Ksrtc's Ashok Leyland Non-ac sleeper bus
Pallakki Class	It is a non-AC ultra-deluxe bus service with 2+1 lower and upper berth sleeper seats built on bi-axle Ashok Leyland Viking 222WB 11.3m chassis with a silver livery. It is a long-distance service operating out of Dakshina Karnataka (Southern Karnataka).	Ashok Leyland	First generation Pallakki Class bus in Kempegowda Bus Station
EV Power Plus+	It is an AC electric luxury bus service with 2+2 reclining seats built by Olectra with a blue livery. It is presently running between the cities of Bengaluru and Mysore, Madikeri, Virajpet, Davanagere, Chikmagalur and Shimoga. It is expected to be operated on various intrastate and interstate routes out of Dakshina Karnataka (Southern Karnataka).	Olectra	KSRTC'S EV Power Plus+
Airavat Class	Launched in 2003, It is an AC luxury bus service with 45 reclining semi-sleeper seats (2+2) built on a bi-axle Volvo B7R (Old) or Volvo B8R (New) chassis with a white livery. It is a long-distance service operating out of Dakshina Karnataka (Southern Karnataka).	Volvo	KSRTC's Airavat Class
Airavat Club Class	Launched in 2012, It is an AC luxury bus service with 2+2 reclining semi-sleeper seats (53 seats on the 13.8 m Volvo model) built on a multi-axle Volvo B9R (Old) or Volvo B11R (New), Scania and Mercedes-Benz 0 500 R 1830 chassis with a white livery. It is a long-distance service operating out of Dakshina Karnataka (Southern Karnataka).	Volvo; Scania; Mercedes-Benz	KSRTC's Airavat Club Class A Volvo 9400 B11R Airavat Club Class bus operated by Karnataka State Road Transport Corporation
Airavat Club Class 2.0	Launched in 2024, It is an AC luxury bus service with 2+2 reclining seats using Volvo 9600 multi-axle semi-sleeper buses with a white livery. It is a long-distance service operating out of Dakshina Karnataka (Southern Karnataka).	Volvo	KSRTC'S Volvo 9600 semi-sleeper bus Airavat club class 2.0
Flybus	It is an AC luxury bus service with 2+2 reclining seats with a restroom (chemical toilet) and GPS connectivity, built on a multi-axle Volvo B9R (Old) or Volvo B11R (New) chassis with a golden livery. It is a service connecting Kempegowda International Airport to Davangere, Mysore, Madikeri and Kundapura.	Volvo	KSRTC'S Flybus
AC Sleeper Class	Launched in 2024, it is an AC luxury bus service with 2+1 lower and upper berth sleeper seats built on a bi-axle Tata Imac chassis with a white livery. It is a long-distance service operating out of Dakshina Karnataka (Southern Karnataka).	Tata	
Ambaari Class	It is an AC luxury bus service with 2+1 lower and upper berth sleeper seats built on a bi-axle Corona chassis with a white livery. It is a long-distance service operating out of Dakshina Karnataka (Southern Karnataka).	Corona	KSRTC's Ambaari Class
Ambaari Dream Class	It is an AC luxury bus service with 2+1 lower and upper berth sleeper seats built on a multi-axle Volvo B11R chassis with a white livery. It is a long-distance service operating out of Dakshina Karnataka (Southern Karnataka).	Volvo	KSRTC'S Ambaari Dream Sleeper Class
Ambaari Utsav Class	It is an AC luxury bus service with 2+1 lower and upper berth sleeper seats on a Volvo 9600 multi-axle sleeper with a light-blue livery. It is a long-distance service operating out of Dakshina Karnataka (Southern Karnataka).	Volvo	Ambaari Utsav Class bus in Bejai bus Terminal

== Former services ==
Name of the Service	Description	Manufacturer	Gallery
AC Nagara Sarige	It was an AC bus service with 2+2 non-reclining seats built on multi-axle Volvo urban chassis with various liveries depending upon the locale. It was an intracity and town service in Dakshina Karnataka (Southern Karnataka) except for Bangalore. Bangalore Metropolitan Region is served by Bangalore Metropolitan Transport Corporation in the name of Vajra Bus service.	Volvo	Volvo AC Nagara Sarige bus at Mysore
Meghdooth Class	It was an AC luxury bus service with 2+2 reclining seats built on a single-axle Ashok Leyland chassis with a dark blue-white livery. It was a long-distance service operating out of Dakshina Karnataka (Southern Karnataka). This service was replaced with Sheethal Class.	Ashok Leyland	
Sheethal Class	It was an AC luxury bus service with 2+2 reclining seats built on a single-axle Ashok Leyland chassis with a green livery. It was a long-distance service operating out of Dakshina Karnataka (Southern Karnataka). This service was replaced with Airavat Class and was rebranded and merged with other classes like Karnataka Sarige and Rajahamsa Executive Class.	Ashok Leyland	KSRTC'S Defunct Sheetal Class at Kempegowda Bus Station
Vaibhav Class	It was an AC luxury bus service with 2+2 reclining seats with less reclining compared to Rajahamsa Executive Class built on a single-axle Ashok Leyland and Tata chassis with a white livery. It was a long-distance service operating out of Dakshina Karnataka (Southern Karnataka). Currently defunct.	Ashok Leyland; Tata Motors	KSRTC Vaibhav class
Airavat Bliss Class	It was an AC luxury bus service with 2+2 reclining seats with chemical toilets, Wi-Fi, pantry and individual TV screens built on a multi-axle Volvo chassis with a white livery. It was a long-distance service operating out of Dakshina Karnataka (Southern Karnataka). Currently defunct.	Volvo	
Airavat Superia Class	It was an AC luxury bus service with 2+2 reclining seats with chemical toilets, Wi-Fi, and an auto hand wash system built on a multi-axle Volvo chassis with a white livery. It was a long-distance service operating out of Dakshina Karnataka (Southern Karnataka). Currently defunct.	Volvo	
Airavat Diamond Class	It was an AC luxury bus service with 2+2 reclining seats built on a multi-axle Scania chassis with a white livery. It was a long-distance service operating out of Dakshina Karnataka (Southern Karnataka). This service was rebranded and merged with Airavat Club Class.	Scania	KSRTC-Scania-Airavat-Diamond-Class

== Welfares and Schemes ==
=== 'Shakti Scheme' Free Bus Service for women ===
'Shakti Scheme' was announced by the Second Siddaramaiah ministry on 2 June 2023. It started on 11 June 2023, providing free-of-charge bus service to Karnataka-domiciled women. Beneficiaries show their government-issued photo identity and address proof for the first three months. Bus conductors issue them zero-fare tickets. Thereafter, beneficiaries obtain Shakti smartcards (named after the name of the scheme) through an application submitted via the government's Seva Sindhu website.

==== Terms and conditions of the scheme ====
- The scheme will apply to all four Road Transport Corporations in the state (KSRTC, BMTC, NWKRTC and KKRTC).
- Nagara Sarige, Gramantara Sarige, Karnataka Sarige, Ashwamedha Classic Class, Vayavya Nagara Sarige, Vayavya Gramantara Sarige, Vayavya Karnataka Sarige, Kalyana Nagara Sarige, Kalyana Gramantara Sarige, Kalyana Karnataka Sarige, Bengaluru Sarige, Samparka and Astra services will be part of the scheme.
- Women can travel for free only on bus services within the state. Bus services to destinations outside Karnataka will be outside the scheme's purview even if women travel within the state. For example, a woman travelling to Mangaluru in Karnataka i.e., within the state on an Udupi-Kasaragod bus service which is an interstate service to Kasaragod in neighbouring Kerala, will have to buy a ticket.
- The scheme will not apply to luxury buses (Rajahamsa Executive Class, Airavat Class, Airavat Club Class, Pallakki Class, Amoghavarsha Class, Ambaari Class, Ambaari Dream Class, Ambaari Utsav Class, Kalyana Ratha Class, Flybus, EV Power Plus+, Bengaluru Darshini, Vajra and Vayu Vajra services).
- Half of the seats on KSRTC, NWKRTC and KKRTC's ordinary and express buses will be reserved for men. Luxury, AC and interstate buses as well as BMTC buses will be exempted from this.
- The government will reimburse the RTCs based on the distance women travel.

=== Free Bus passes for Students ===
In June 2026 the Karnataka government under Chief Minister D.K. Shivakumar announced free bus passes for students studying in Karnataka from primary school to postgraduate level, as well as for students in border areas within 20 km of the Karnataka border. It applies to both boys and girls. Per KSRTC, free passes are issued to all students in the state from 12 June 2026 under a government order. Students apply online through the Seva Sindhu / Seva One portal, or at Karnataka-One and Grama-One centres for a ₹30 service charge, and collect the pass at one of 123 counters. Students residing in Karnataka but studying in neighbouring states, and students from neighbouring border areas studying in Karnataka, are also eligible. Existing eligibility criteria and pass validity continue, with passes valid for 10 months (12 months for ITI courses).

- Nagara Sarige, Gramantara Sarige, Karnataka Sarige, Ashwamedha Classic Class, Samparka is part of this Scheme.

=== Other concessions and passes ===
- Senior citizens: Residents of Karnataka aged 60 or above get a 25% fare concession on city, suburban, ordinary, express, semi-luxury and Rajahamsa services, including interstate operations.
- Persons with disabilities: A concessional pass costing ₹660 per year is issued to Karnataka residents with a disability of 40% or more, valid within 100 km of the holder's residence.
- Blind persons: Free passes valid for five years are issued to fully blind residents of Karnataka, valid on city, suburban, ordinary and express buses of KSRTC, BMTC, NWKRTC and KKRTC, including interstate buses.
- Monthly and daily passes: Monthly passes for mofussil services (from 7 January 2025) range from ₹520 (express) and ₹460 (ordinary) at stage 1, with additional city and daily passes for routes such as Bengaluru and Mysuru from nearby towns.

== Karnataka's Road Transport Undertakings ==
- KSRTC, Bangalore: Operates out most of the parts of Karnataka.
- NWKRTC, Hubli: Operates out of North-Western Karnataka except Bijapur district.
- KKRTC, Gulbarga: Operates out of North-Eastern Karnataka and Bijapur district.
- BMTC, Bangalore: Operates in Bangalore Metropolitan Region offering transit service.

== Namma Cargo Logistics and Parcel Services ==
Namma Cargo Logistics and Parcel Services was launched on 26 February 2021. It provides cargo and parcel services on the routes in which The KSRTC (Karnataka), NWKRTC and KKRTC buses travel.

== Information technology ==
According to KSRTC, it was the first state transport undertaking in India to deploy electronic ticketing machines (from 15 August 2004) and to offer a web-based passenger seat reservation system (from 29 April 2006), branded AWATAR (Any Where Any Time Advance Reservation).

== See also ==
- List of bus depots in Karnataka
- List of bus stations in Karnataka
- North Western Karnataka Road Transport Corporation
- Kalyana Karnataka Road Transport Corporation
- Bengaluru Metropolitan Transport Corporation
