= Mysuru Road Bus Station =

Major bus station in Bengaluru, India

Coordinates: 12°57′11.08″N 77°32′37.18″E

Mysuru Road Bus Station Maisūru Raste Bas Nildāṇa
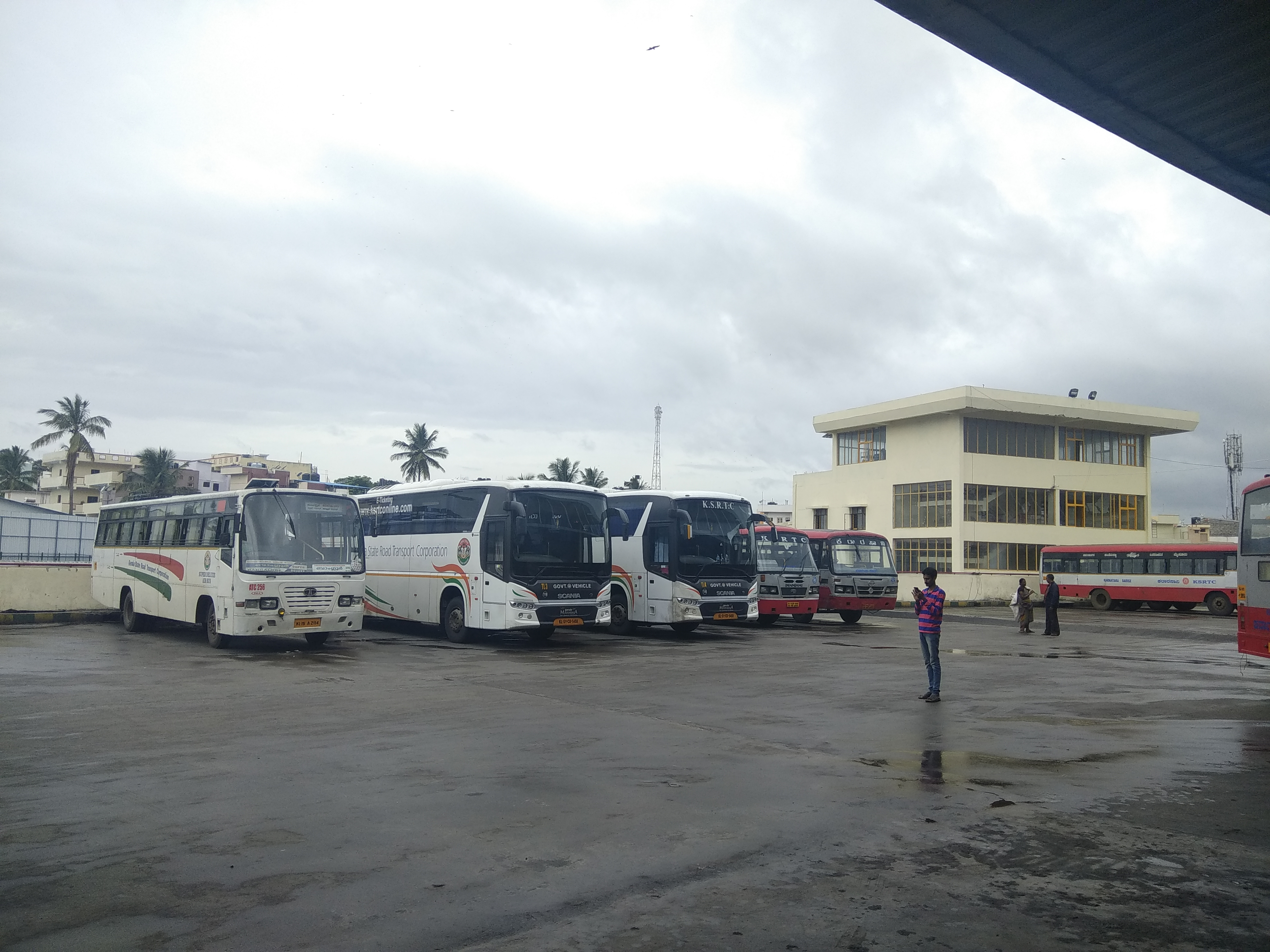
- One Kerala KSRTC's Super-deluxe, two Kerala KSRTC's Garuda Maharaja and two Karnataka KSRTC's Karnataka Sarige buses parked side by side.

General information
- Other names: Mysuru Road Satellite Bus Station; MRBS; MCTC
- Location: Mysuru Road, Bengaluru; Karnataka; India
- System: Karnataka KSRTC, TNSTC, Kerala KSRTC; K-SWIFT, PRTC and BMTC Bus Station
- Owner: Karnataka State Road Transport Corporation
- Operator: Karnataka State Road Transport Corporation
- Transit authority: BMTC
- Platforms: 1-9
- Bus routes: Karnataka; Tamil Nadu; Kerala; Puducherry; Bengaluru Metropolitan Region
- Bus operators: Karnataka State Road Transport Corporation; Tamil Nadu State Transport Corporation; Kerala State Road Transport Corporation; KSRTC SWIFT; Puducherry Road Transport Corporation; Bengaluru Metropolitan Transport Corporation
- Connections: BMTC; Mysuru Road Bus Station

Construction
- Structure type: At-grade
- Parking: Available
- Accessible: Yes

History
- Opened: 2005
Location

Mysuru Road Bus Station (MRBS), is one of the four major bus stations that serve as mofussil bus station hubs for the city of Bengaluru, India. It is located on Mysuru road. The other three major bus stations in Bengaluru are Kempegowda Bus Station (KBS), Shantinagara Bus Station (SBS) and Basaveshwara Bus Station (BBS). It is the second busiest mofussil bus station in Bengaluru only after Kempegowda Bus Station. It started functioning in 2005.

== Location and connectivity ==
MRBS is located nearly 2 km from Sirsi Circle near Gopalan Mall on Mysuru Road. This bus station has a separate area for outstation buses, a depot and separate bays for BMTC buses. It is well connected to other places like Vijayanagara, Jayanagara, Kempegowda International Airport(KIA), Kempegowda Bus Station(KBS), Krishna Rajendra Market, Shantinagara Bus Station(SBS), Basaveshwara Bus Station(BBS), Kengeri, Bidadi, Magadi Road, Nagarbhavi, and Peenya by bus.

Among Outstation buses, All KSRTC buses towards Mysuru, Madikeri, Virajpette, Kollegal, Chamarajanagara, Ramanagara, Male Mahadeshwara Betta, Kozhikode, Kalpetta, Kasargod, Tamil Nadu(only normal fare buses) start from here. All Kerala SRTC, PRTC services start from here. TNSTC's normal fared buses start from this bus station to destinations such as Udagai(Ooty), Puducherry, Tiruvannamalai, Coonoor, Coimbatore, Hosur, Salem, Erode, Kanchipuram, Vellore, Vaniyambadi, Edappadi, Kallakurichi, Arni, Tirupathur, Villupuram, Chennai, Tambaram, Melmaruvathur and other places.

== Depot ==
This bus stand hosts Depot-6 of KSRTC-Bengaluru Central division.

== See also ==
- Bangalore Metropolitan Transport Corporation
- Karnataka State Road Transport Corporation
