= Odisha State Road Transport Corporation =

Public transport corporation in Odisha, India

Odisha State Road Transport Corporation (OSRTC)

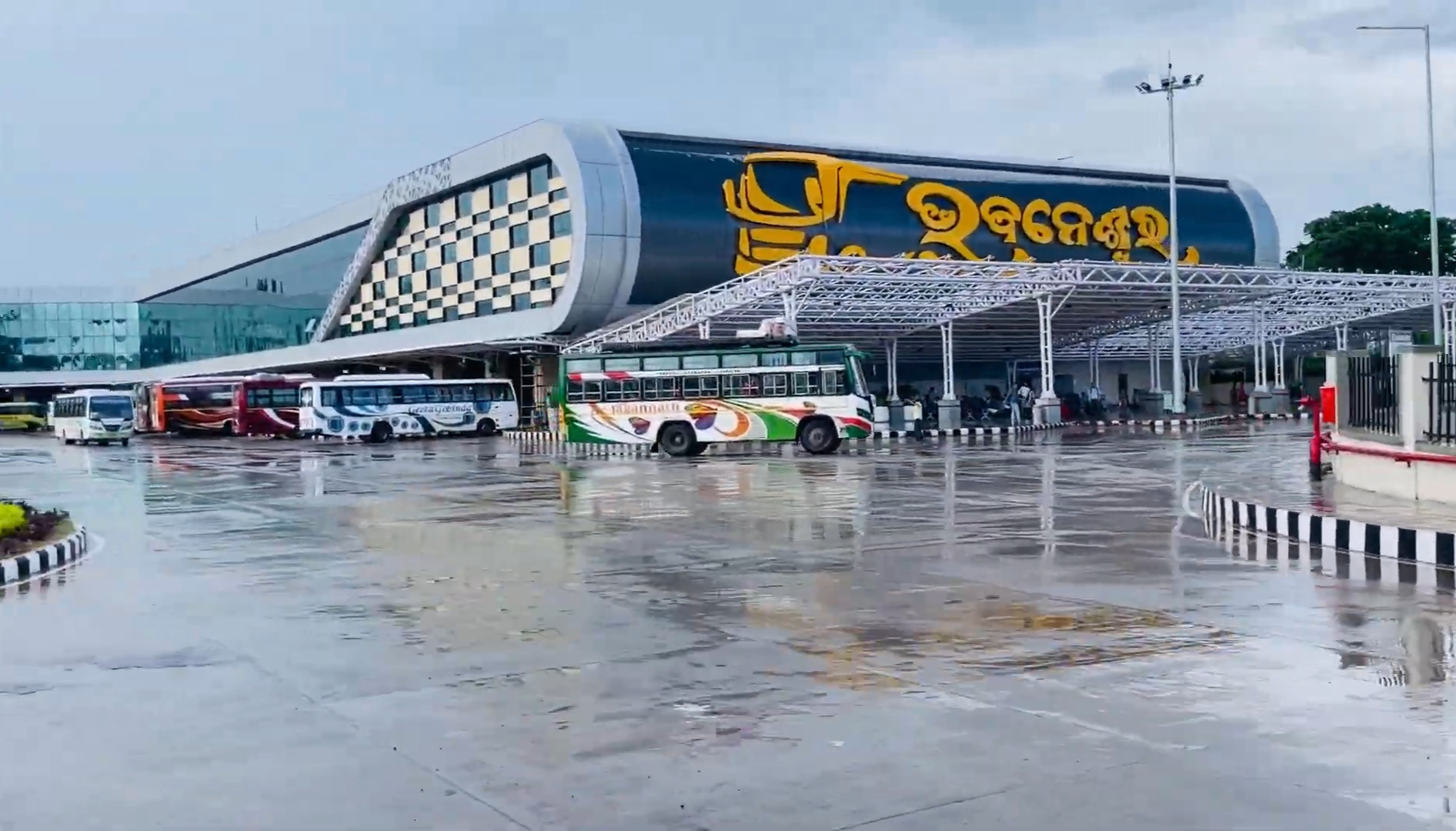
- Native name: ଓଡ଼ିଶା ରାଜ୍ୟ ସଡ଼କ ପରିବହନ ନିଗମ
- Type: Public
- Industry: Public transport bus service
- Founded: 15 May 1974 (52 years ago)
- Headquarters: Paribahan Bhavan, Sachivalaya Marg, Bhubaneswar, Odisha, India
- Area served: Odisha; Andhra Pradesh; West Bengal
- Key people: NBS Rajput, IAS, chairman and managing director
- Services: Public Transport
- Revenue: ▲₹1,564,300,000 (US$16 million)
- Owner: Government of Odisha
- Number of employees: 2,455
- Parent: Department of Commerce & Transport, Government of Odisha
- Website: osrtc.org

The Odisha State Road Transport Corporation (OSRTC) is the state-owned public road transport corporation of the eastern Indian state of Odisha. Headquartered in Bhubaneswar, OSRTC plays a crucial role in connecting major cities, district headquarters, rural regions, and neighboring states through its intercity and interstate operations with 577 buses of mainline fleet and 1422 buses of rural fleet.

Founded in 1974, the OSRTC bridges distances between 130+ cities, towns, and business centres within Odisha and 68 cities outside the state, strengthening regional integration and interstate connectivity. The Corporation also plays a vital role in supporting education and employment by enabling access to over 62,000 educational institutions, making daily mobility easier for students, professionals, and the workforce alike.

== History ==
The origins of public road transport in Odisha trace back to 1948, when the State Government took over bus services previously operated by erstwhile princely states and formed the State Transport Services (STS), starting with a staff of 4,089 and a fleet of 523 buses. In 1950, the Road Transport Corporations Act (Act No. 64 of 1950) was enacted by the Central Government, mandating the creation of state road transport corporations. Subsequently, the OSRTC Rules were framed in 1967 as a step toward establishing a dedicated statutory transport corporation in Odisha.

OSRTC became functional on 15 May 1974, when the assets and employees of the STS were formally transferred to the new corporation. Initially, it operated with share capital contributions from the State and Central Governments in a 2:1 ratio. Further strengthening its reach, the ORT Company, which operated primarily in the southern districts of Odisha, was merged with OSRTC on 16 August 1990, bringing its assets, liabilities, and staff under OSRTC’s management. Around this time, the Central Government also ceased its share capital contribution (from 1990–91 onwards), leaving the state government as the primary sponsor.

== Services ==
=== Mainline Fleet ===
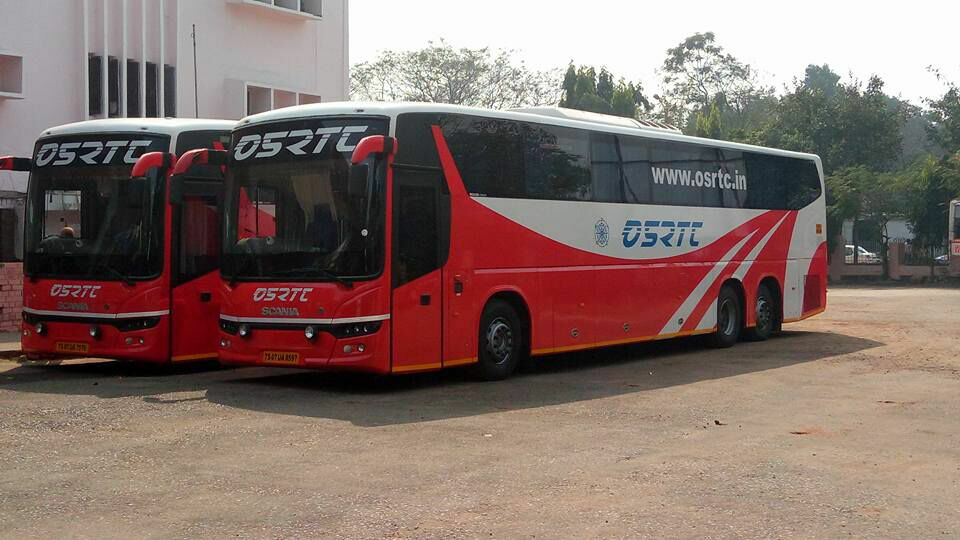
A pair of OSRTC mainline buses parked at the Paribahan Bhavan in Bhubaneswar

OSRTC maintains a strong intercity and interstate network supported by a fleet of 577 buses. OSRTC offers online reservations, real-time bus tracking, and user-friendly onboard facilities. OSRTC's services operate on strategic routes connecting major commercial centres, district headquarters, and prominent pilgrimage destinations.

- Luxury Buses
- AC Deluxe Buses
- Hi-Tech Buses
- Hi-Comfort Buses
- Light Commercial Vehicle (LCV)/Ordinary Buses

=== Rural Fleet ===
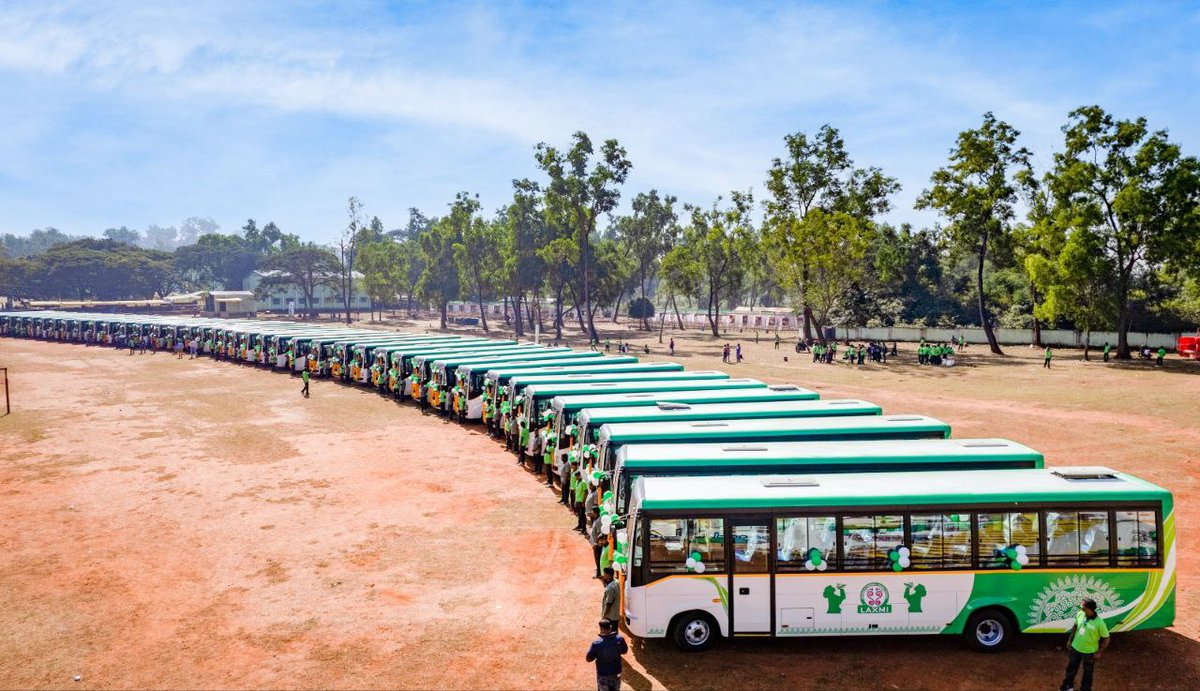
Rural fleet of the OSRTC at Koraput Bus Terminal

Under the Mukhyamantri Bus Seva (MBS), OSRTC operates a dedicated rural fleet of 1422 buses, connecting over 6720 Gram Panchayats across Odisha, enabling daily mobility for around 3.5 lakh citizens. This fleet is designed to ensure affordable, inclusive, and dependable transport for rural populations, with special focus on students, women, senior citizens, and daily commuters.

=== Initiatives ===
==== Atal Bus Stand ====
Atal Bus Stands are modern bus terminals that are being developed across all 314 Blocks of Odisha, creating well-planned passenger facilities that enhance commuter convenience, accessibility, and overall transport infrastructure.

==== Integrated Transport Management System (ITMS) ====
ITMS is a citizen-focused digital platform that enables real-time fleet tracking, e-ticketing, automated scheduling, and enhanced passenger safety. The system also features a comprehensive grievance redressal mechanism, ensuring efficient, transparent, and responsive service delivery.

==== Integrated Command & Control Centre (ICCC) ====
ICCC is a centralized real-time operations hub based at Paribahan Bhawan, designed to monitor services, manage incidents, and improve operational responsiveness and decision-making across the network.

==== Shree Jagannath Express ====
Shree Jagannath Express buses are ultra-premium intercity and interstate buses operating with 15-metre multi-axle Volvo 9600 coaches, connecting district headquarters with major cities, Puri and Bhubaneswar.

== Divisions ==
Odisha State Road Transport Corporation (OSRTC) has three divisions comprising a total of 23 depots.

- Bhubaneswar Division
- Berhampur Division
- Sambalpur Division

=== Depots ===
- Angul
- Aska
- Balangir
- Bargarh
- Berhampur
- Bhanjanagar
- Bhawanipatna
- Bhubaneswar
- Cuttack
- Deogarh
- Jeypore
- Keonjhar
- Malkangiri
- Nabarangpur
- Nuapada
- Padampur
- Paralakhemundi
- Phulbani
- Puri (Malatipatpur)
- Rayagada
- Rourkela
- Sambalpur
- Sundargarh
- Vizianagaram

== Accolades ==
Year	Award	Conferrer
1991–92	Merit – Performance in Productivity	National Productivity Council (NPC)
1992	Best Passenger Safety	Association of State Road Transport Undertakings (ASRTU)
1995–96	Maximum Improvement in Tyre Performance	Association of State Road Transport Undertakings (ASRTU)
1998	Road Safety Under Mofussil Category	Association of State Road Transport Undertakings (ASRTU)
2002–03	Lowest Operational Cost Under Mofussil Category	Association of State Road Transport Undertakings (ASRTU)
2003–04	Lowest Operational Cost Under Mofussil Category	Association of State Road Transport Undertakings (ASRTU)
2004–05	Transport Minister's Trophy for Safe Transport Lowest Accident Record	Ministry of Road Transport and Highways
2005–06	Transport Minister's Trophy for Safe Transport Lowest Accident Record	Ministry of Road Transport and Highways
2007–08	Minimum Operational Cost	Association of State Road Transport Undertakings (ASRTU)
2008–09	Minimum Operational Cost	Association of State Road Transport Undertakings (ASRTU)
2010–11	Profit Making STU in Mofussil Service	Association of State Road Transport Undertakings (ASRTU)
2011–12	Minimum Operational Cost	Association of State Road Transport Undertakings (ASRTU)
2012–13	Minimum Operational Cost	Association of State Road Transport Undertakings (ASRTU)
2013–14	Minimum Operational Cost and Highest KMPL	Association of State Road Transport Undertakings (ASRTU)
2014–15	Highest KMPL and Best Profit Making State Transport Undertakings	Association of State Road Transport Undertakings (ASRTU)
2015–16	Highest KMPL and Best Profit Making State Transport Undertakings	Association of State Road Transport Undertakings (ASRTU)
2017–18	Maximum Improvement in Tyre Performance	Association of State Road Transport Undertakings (ASRTU)
2017–18	Minimum Operational Cost	Association of State Road Transport Undertakings (ASRTU)
2017–18	Highest KMPL and Profit Making State Transport Undertakings	Association of State Road Transport Undertakings (ASRTU)
2018	Minimum Operational Cost Among State Transport Undertakings	Smart City Summit 2018; Surat, Gujarat
2018	Web-based Ticketing System with Mobile Android and iOS App	SKOCH Order-of-Merit 2018
2019	In-Bus Ticketing Through GRPS/RFID Based Electronics Ticket Machines (ETMs)	SKOCH Order-of-Merit 2019
2018–19	OSRTC Bhawanipatna and Padampur Depots – Fuel Efficiency Awards	Petroleum Conservation Research Association (PCRA); Ministry of Petroleum and Natural Gas
2020	Indian Express Technology Sabha Award 2020 – Depot Management System	Indian Express Limited
2024	SKOCH Award Winner for Silver Category - Gramanchal Parivahan Seva	SKOCH Order-of-Merit 2024
2023–24	National Public Bus Transport Excellence Award for Highest Percentage of Non-Traffic Revenues	Association of State Road Transport Undertakings (ASRTU)

Apart from all these accolades, the success story of OSRTC has been included in the syllabus of Indian Institute of Management Ahmedabad as a case study.
