= Kempegowda Bus Station =

Bus station in Bangalore, India

Kempegowda Bus Station Kempēgauḍa Bas Nildāṇa
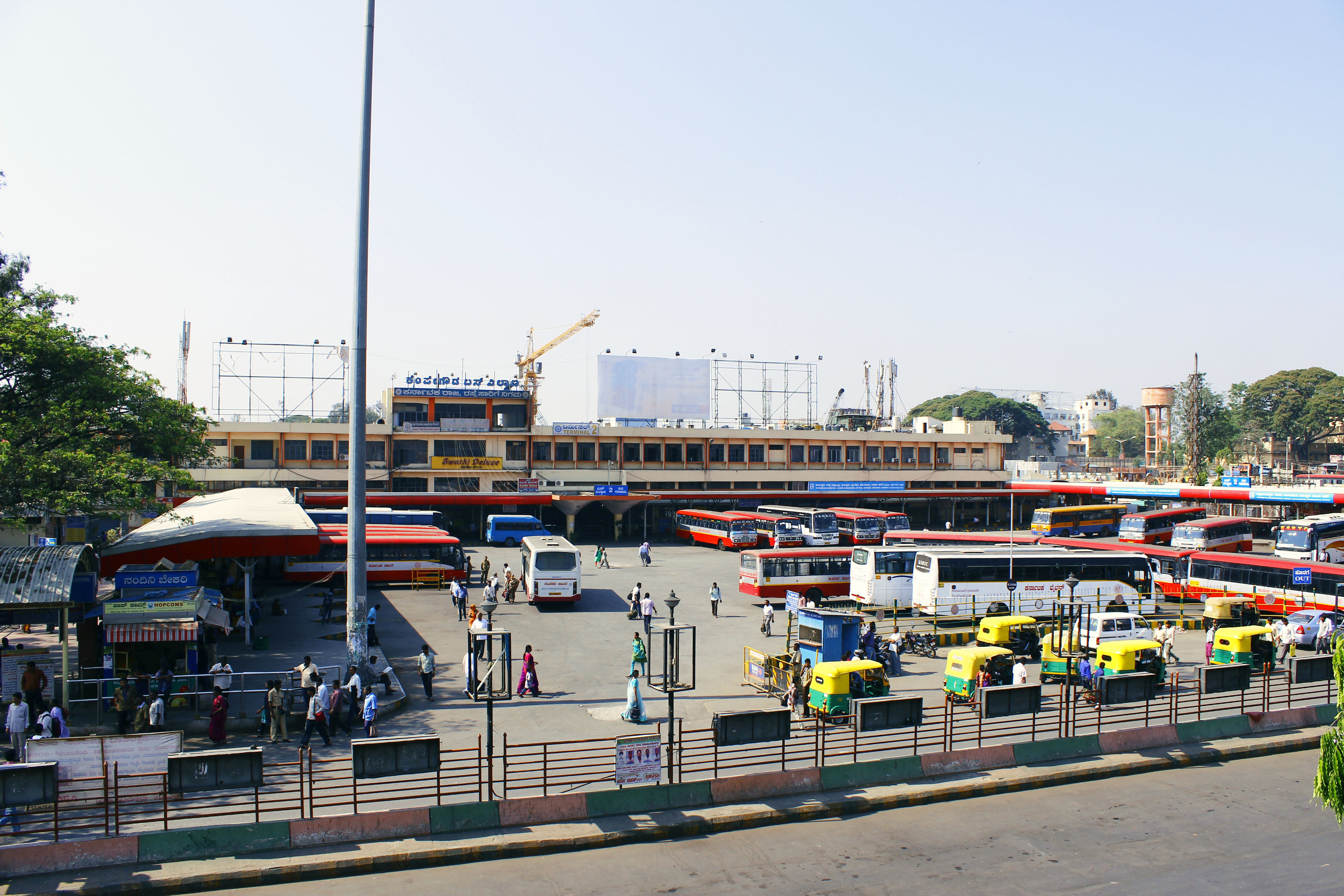

General information
- Other names: Majestic Bus Station; Majestic; KBS
- Location: Kempegowda, Sevashrama, Bengaluru 560009; Karnataka; India
- Coordinates: 12.97679°N 77.57260°E
- System: BMTC, KSRTC, NWKRTC, KKRTC, APSRTC, TSRTC, MSRTC and KTC Bus Station
- Owner: Intracity — Bangalore Metropolitan Transport Corporation; Intercity — Karnataka State Road Transport Corporation
- Operator: Intracity — Bangalore Metropolitan Transport Corporation; Intercity — Karnataka State Road Transport Corporation
- Transit authority: BMTC; Namma Metro
- Platforms: Intracity; Bay 01 — Platform 01, 02, 3A, 3B, 4A & 4B; Bay 02 — Platform 05, 06, 6A, 07, 08, 8A, 8B, 09 & 10; Bay 03 — Platform 11, 11A, 11B, 11C, 12, 12A, 13, 14, 15, 15A, 16, 17, 17A, 18 & 18A; Bay 04 — Platform 19, 19A, 19B, 19C, 19D, 20, 20A, 20B, 21, 22, 22A, 23, 23A, 23B, 23C, 23D, 24, 25, 25A, 25B, 25C, 26, 26A, 27, 27A, 28, 28A, 29, 29A, 29B & 29C; Intercity; Terminal 01 — Platform 11, 14, 15, 16, 17 & 18; Terminal 02 — Platform 05 & 06; Terminal 2A — Platform 1A, 01, 02, 03 & 04; Terminal 03 — Platform 07, 08 & 10
- Bus routes: Karnataka; Andhra Pradesh; Telangana; Maharashtra; Goa; Kerala; Tamil Nadu; Bengaluru Metropolitan Region
- Bus stands: Intracity — 4 Bays; Intercity — 4 Terminals
- Bus operators: Bengaluru Metropolitan Transport Corporation; Karnataka State Road Transport Corporation; North Western Karnataka Road Transport Corporation; Kalyana Karnataka Road Transport Corporation; Tamil Nadu State Transport Corporation; Tamil Nadu State Express Transport Corporation; Andhra Pradesh State Road Transport Corporation; Telangana State Road Transport Corporation; Maharashtra State Road Transport Corporation; Kadamba Transport Corporation
- Connections: Purple Line Green Line Nadaprabhu Kempegowda Station, Majestic; KSR Bengaluru

Construction
- Structure type: At-grade
- Parking: Available
- Accessible: Yes

History
- Opened: Intracity — 1980; Intercity — 1969
Location

Kempegowda Bus Station (KBS) is an integrated main bus station in Bengaluru, India. It is located opposite the KSR Bengaluru railway station. It is bordered by Seshadri Road to the north, Danavanthri Road to the east, Tank Bund Road to the south and Gubbi Thotadappa Road to the west.

This bus station provides connectivity to almost all the areas of Bengaluru. One side of the bus station is used for intra-city buses by the Bengaluru Metropolitan Transport Corporation (BMTC) while the other side is used by out-station buses operated by various state road transport corporations. The KSRTC side of the bus station also houses the Nadaprabhu Kempegowda (Majestic) metro station on the Namma Metro.

Former chief minister of Karnataka R. Gundu Rao is credited with building the station. The bus station not only eased congestion with buses and helped streamline the transport system but also helped the local area grow economically and was a major landmark of the city for many years.

In 2025, Karnataka Chief Minister Siddaramaiah announced that the bus stand will be redeveloped under the Project Majestic scheme under the public-private partnership (PPP) model.

== Name ==
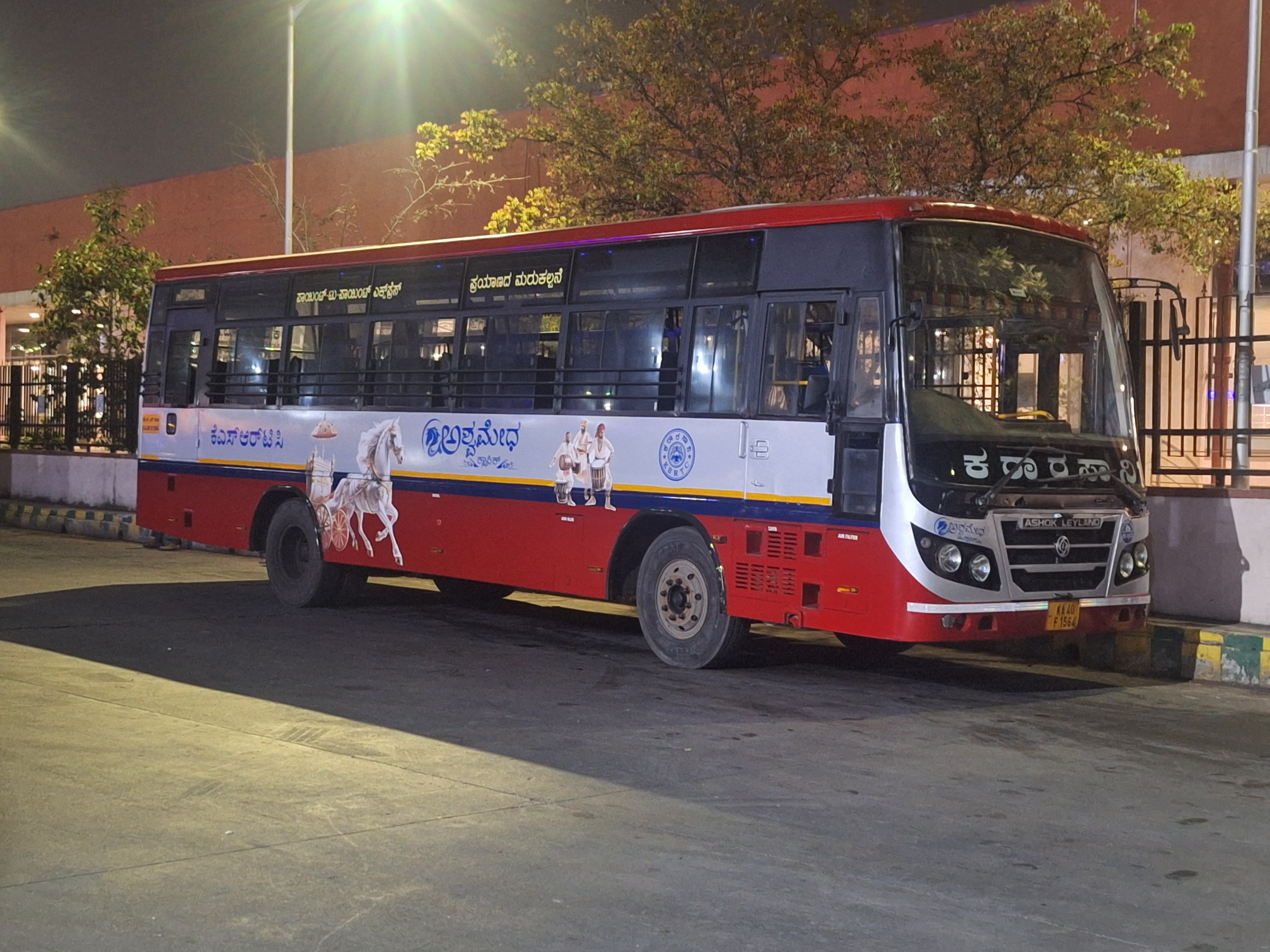
Ashwamedha bus at Kempegowda bus stand

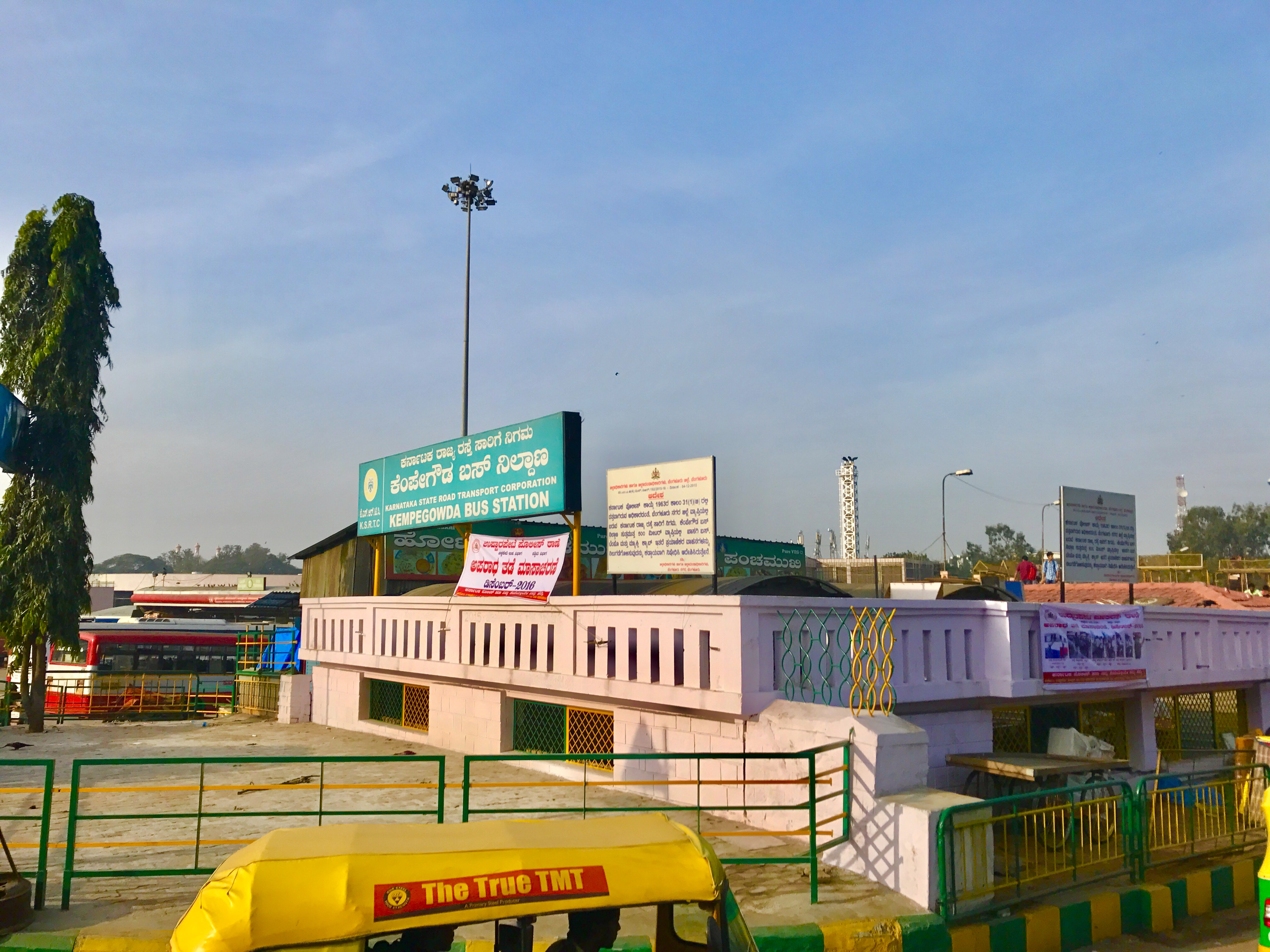
Bus Station name near Entrance

The station acquired the name "Majestic" from a popular cinema theatre of the same name located nearby. It was later named as Kempegowda Bus Station in honour of Kempe Gowda I, the founder of Bangalore. However, Majestic continues to be the most commonly used name for the station. Buses terminating at the station usually display signs that show "Kempegowda Bus Station" or "KBS".

== History ==
The bus station started construction in 1965 and opened in 1969. The semi-circular city bus terminal was later built in the 1980s. The station is located on the site of the Dharmambudhi Lake, which dried up in the early 20th century.

== BMTC AC Bus Routes ==
Route Number	Terminus	Via
G7	Janapriya Township	Okalipuram, Rajajinagar, KHB Colony, Sumanahalli, Kottigepalya, Sunkadakatte, Anjananagar, Bydarahalli Kadabagere Cross
KIA-9	Kempegowda International Airport	Shivananda Stores, Palace Guttahalli, Mekhri Circle, Hebbal, Esteem Mall, Yelahanka Air Force, Hunasamaranahalli, Chikkajala, Sadahalli Gate
25A	Kuvempu Nagar (BTM Layout)	Maharani College, Corporation, Lalbagh, Ashoka Pillar, Jayanagar 3rd Block, Jayanagar 4th Block, East End Jayanagar, MICO Layout, BTM Layout Circle.
45G	Kamakya	Chamrajpet, Hanumanthanagar, Hosakerehalli, Kathriguppe
129	Shivajinagar	Maharani College, Vidhana Soudha, Balekundri Circle
226KBS	Wonderla	Cottonpete, Sirsi Circle, Mysore Road Bus Station, Nayandahalli, Kengeri, Anchepalya, Kumbalagodu, Hejjala
EXP-240MD	Magadi	Magadi Toll Gate, Summanahalli, Sunkadakatte, Tavarekere, Hosapete Gate
EXP-258DK	Dabaspete	Central, Malleshwaram, Yeshwanthpur Railway Station, Goraguntepalya, Madavara, Nelamangala
285M	Doddaballapura	Shivananda Stores, Palace Guttahalli, Mekhri Circle, Hebbal, Esteem Mall, Kodigehalli, Yelahanka, Puttenahalli, Rajanukunte, Marasandra, Bashettihalli
EXP-285M	Doddaballapura	Palace Guttahalli, Mekhri Circle, Hebbal, Esteem Mall, Yelahanka, Rajanukunte
298MN	Chikkaballapura	Shivananda Stores, Palace Guttahalli, Mekhri Circle, Hebbal, Esteem Mall, Kodigehalli, Allalasandra, Bagalur Cross, Yelahanka Air Force, Hunasamaranahalli, Chikkajala, Sadahalli Gate, Airport Trumpet, Devanahalli Bypass
EXP-298MN	Chikkaballapura	Shivananda Stores, Palace Guttahalli, Mekhri Circle, Hebbal, Esteem Mall, Kodigehalli, Allalasandra, Bagalur Cross, Yelahanka Air Force, Hunasamaranahalli, Chikkajala, Sadahalli Gate, Airport Trumpet, Devanahalli Bypass
300H	KR Pura Government Hospital	Maharani College, Corporation, Richmond Circle, Mayohall, Trinity Circle, Halasuru, Indiranagar 100Ft Road, Swami Vivekananda Road Metro, Baiyappanahalli Metro, Tin Factory, ITI Gate
300MV	Sir M Visveswaraya Railway Station	Maharani College, Vidhana Soudha, Balekundri Circle, Vasanth Nagar, Cantonment Railway Station, Coles Road, Maruthi Seva Nagar
317A	Hoskote	Maharani College, Corporation, Richmond Circle, Mayohall, Trinity Circle, Halasuru, Indiranagar 100Ft Road, Swami Vivekananda Road Metro, Baiyappanahalli Metro, Tin Factory, ITI Gate, KR Puram, Subashnagar, Medahalli, Budigere Cross, Katamanallur Gate, Hoskote Toll Plaza
333E	Kadugodi (Via Siddapura, Varthur)	Maharani College, Corporation, Richmond Circle, Mayohall, Dommalur, HAL, Marathahalli Bridge, Kundalahalli Gate, Siddapura, Varthur Kodi, Whitefield, Hope Farm
335E	Kadugodi (Via AECS Layout, Vydehi Hospital, ITPL)	Maharani College, Corporation, Richmond Circle, Mayohall, Dommalur, HAL, Marathahalli Bridge, Kundalahalli Gate, AECS Layout Cross, Kundalahalli Colony, Graphite India, Vydehi Hospital, Sathya Sai Hospital, ITPL, Hope Farm
335T	ITPL	Maharani College, Corporation, Richmond Circle, Mayohall, Dommalur, HAL, Marathahalli Bridge, Kundalahalli Gate, AECS Layout Cross, Kundalahalli Colony, Graphite India, Vydehi Hospital, Sathya Sai Hospital
342F	Sarjapur	Maharani College, Corporation, Richmond Circle, Shantinagar, Dairy Circle, Madiwala, Koramangala, Jakkasandra, Agara Junction, Sarjapura Ring Road Junction, Bellandur Gate, Kaikondrahalli, Doddakannalli, Kodati Gate, Dommasandra, Sompura
342FD	Doddakanalli	Maharani College, Corporation, Richmond Circle, Shantinagar, Dairy Circle, Madiwala, Koramangala, Jakkasandra, Agara Junction, Sarjapura Ring Road Junction, Bellandur Gate, Kaikondrahalli
356M	Anekal	Maharani College, Corporation, Lalbagh, Dairy Circle, Madiwala, Koramangala Water Tank, Central Silk Board, Bommanahalli, Kudlu Gate, Hosa Road Junction, NICE Road Junction, Electronic City, Huskur Gate, Hebbagodi, Bommasandra, Chandapura, Surya Nagar, Iggalur, Karpura Gate, Kavalahosahalli
360B	Attibelle Circle	Maharani College, Corporation, Richmond Circle, Shantinagar, Dairy Circle, Madiwala, Central Silk Board, Bommanahalli, Kudlu Gate, Hosa Road Junction, NICE Road Junction, Electronic City, Huskur Gate, Hebbagodi, Bommasandra, Chandapura, Neraluru, Guddahatti Gate
EXP-360B	Attibelle Circle	Maharani College, Corporation, Richmond Circle, Shantinagar, Dairy Circle, Madiwala, Central Silk Board, Bommanahalli, Electronic City, Huskur Gate, Hebbagodi, Bommasandra, Chandapura, Neraluru, Guddahatti Gate
365	Bannerughatta	Maharani College, Corporation, Richmond Circle, Shantinagar, Dairy Circle, Madiwala, Central Silk Board, Bommanahalli, Electronic City, Huskur Gate, Hebbagodi, Bommasandra, Chandapura, Neraluru, Guddahatti Gate
365J	Jigani APC Circle	Maharani College, Corporation, Richmond Circle, Shantinagar, Dairy Circle, Jayadeva Hospital, Bilekahalli, Hulimavu, Kalena Agrahara, Gottigere, Basavanapura, Kalkere, Bannerughatta, Koppa Gate, Harapanahalli.

== See also ==
- Mysuru Road Bus Station
- Atal Bihari Vajpayee TTMC
- List of things named after Kempe Gowda I
