= Transport in Karnataka =

Karnataka map showing major roads

Karnataka, a state in South India has a well-developed transport system. Its capital city, Bengaluru is well-connected by air to domestic and international destinations and the Kempegowda International Airport (KIA) in the city is one of the busiest airports in India. It was also the headquarters of the airlines Air Deccan and Kingfisher Airlines. The road transport is also well developed in the state with many National and State highways providing means for fast transportation. The headquarters of the South-Western Railway division of Indian Railways is located at Hubballi and this division governs most of the railway network in the state. Konkan Railway which passes along the coastal region of the state is considered one of the toughest engineering projects being undertaken in India till date. Buses, cars and trains are the means of transport for moving across distant places in Karnataka. For transportation within the city or town limits; motorbikes, cars, Kannada States autorickshaws and buses are used. With the advent of low-cost airlines, many people are choosing to travel via air as well.

== Air transport ==
Kempegowda International Airport - Bengaluru is host to 9 domestic airlines and 19 international airlines and Lufthansa, British Airways, Air France, United Airlines, Singapore Airlines and Malaysia Airlines, connecting the city to almost 50 destinations across India and the world. With Bengaluru being the 'IT capital' of India, the air traffic to this city has increased manifold.

Mangaluru International Airport on the other hand connects and domestic destinations like Mumbai, Delhi, Bengaluru, Calicut, Chennai. Mangalore International Airport has recorded 28.1% annual growth in passenger traffic for the year 2015-2016 by carrying 1.67 million passengers, making it the fastest growing airport in the state.

Hubballi Airport is one of the major operational airports serving northern Karnataka. Currently IndiGo have started its operation.

Mysuru Airport Many airlines disconnected the service from mysore as flights which plied to Kempegowda International airport did not go well. New routes of air service were introduced under the UDAAN scheme to Hyderabad and chennai everyday which received great response. Additional to that the state operates flights from bangalore to mysore during dasara festival. The airport landed in major controversies with the runway expansion. A decision was taken to build an underpass as it was blocked by rail route and a national highway connecting Kozhikode - a first kind in the country. Plans are to develop this major tourist destination's airport to an international service as there is competition now from the upcoming Kannur International Airport.

Belagavi Airport is the Oldest and north Karnataka busiest airport and the Major Airport in North Karnataka serving Belgaum city, Part of Goa and southernmost part of Maharashtra, Alliance Air(India) IndiGo Star air To Bangalore, Air India started operation to Bangalore four days a week Mon, thu, fri, Sun including Pune. Spicejet operates daily flights to Mumbai, Bangalore, Hyderabad, Mangalore and Jabalpur. And also Star air operates daily flights to Bangalore and Ahmedabad.

Kalaburagi Airport serves direct flights to Bengaluru and has expansion plans to the other locations in near future.

There are airports at Ballari Airport and Bidar Airport that do not have any air service. In addition, there are private airstrips at Sedam Airport, Koppal Airport and Harihar Airport.

Shivamogga Airport is the newest operational airport with second longest runway after Bengaluru airport that serves direct flights to Bengaluru, Hyderabad, Goa, Tirupathi.

Hassana Airport, Vijayapura Airport, Raichuru Airport are being built under the Public Private Partnership (PPP) model.

=== Under-construction ===
- Hassana Airport
- Vijayapura Airport

=== Planned ===
- New Ballari airport
- Karwara Airport
- Raichuru Airport
- Udupi International Airport

== Rail transport ==
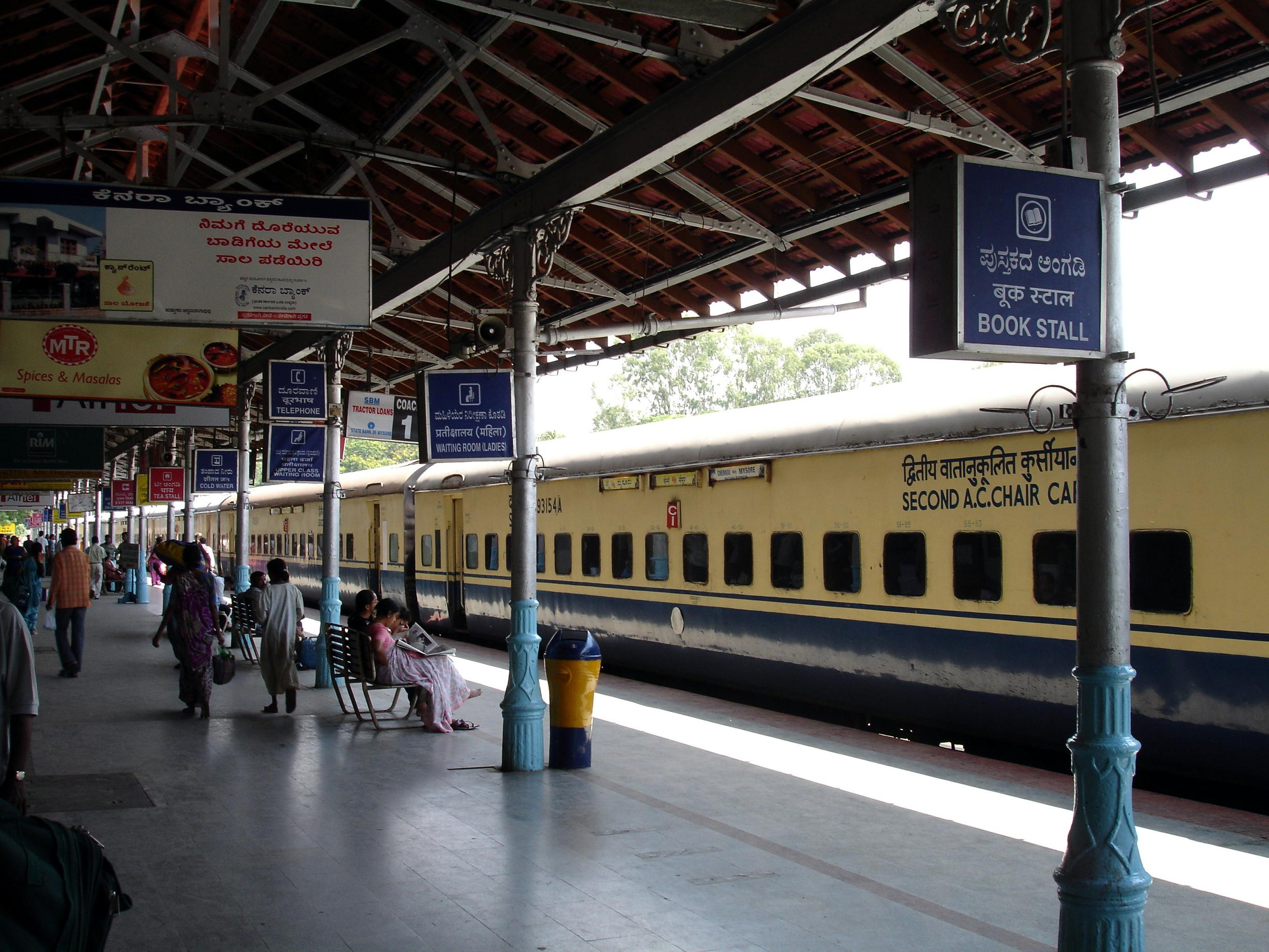
Shatabdi Express parked at Mysore railway station

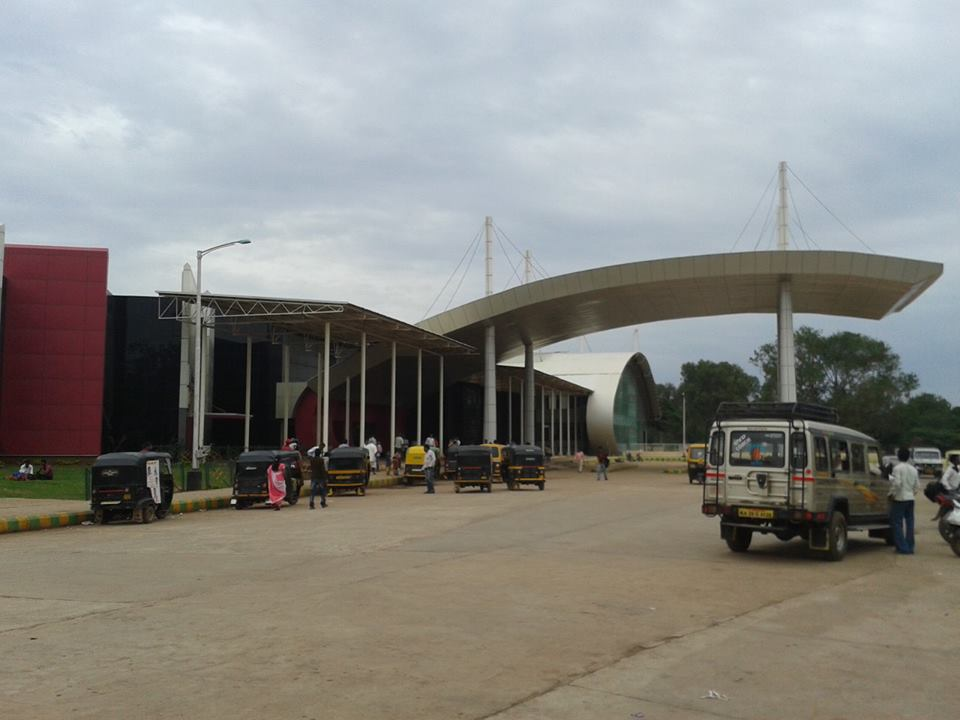
Hubbali railway station built in Modern architecture style as opposed to Karnataka architecture syle

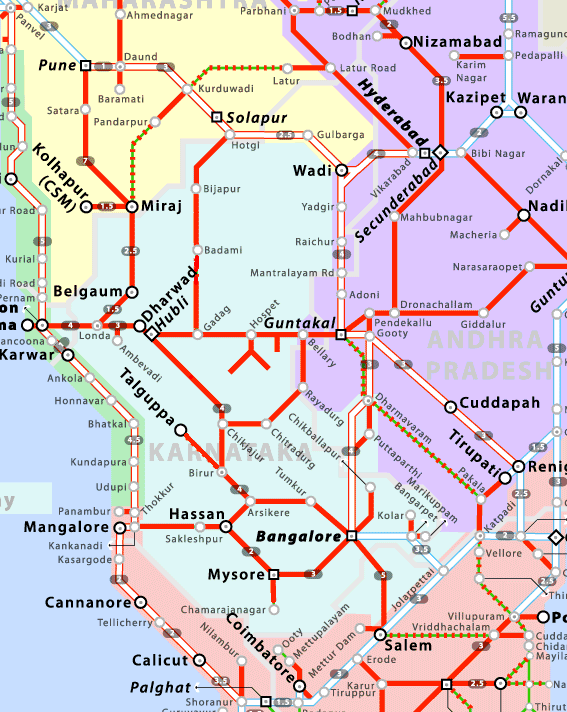
Map of South Western Railway zone

The total length of rail track in Karnataka is 3089 km For a long time after independence, the railway network in the state was under the Southern and Western railway zones which were headquartered at Chennai and Mumbai respectively. The South Western Zone, headquartered at Hubballi was created in 2003 thus fulfilling a long-standing demand of the state. Several parts of the state now come under this zone with the remaining being under Southern Railways. Coastal Karnataka is covered under the Konkan railway network, a project that is regarded as one of the feats of Indian engineering and included the construction of a bridge of length 2,023 metres (6,637 ft) across the river Sharavathi at Honnavar and a tunnel of length 2,960 metres (9,711 ft) at Karwar. Bengaluru, the capital city, is extensively connected with inter-state destinations while other important cities and towns in the state are not so well-connected. The train connectivity within Karnataka has improved since K.H.Muniyappa, Member of Parliament from Kolar constituency has been the Union Minister of State for Railways.

- Mangaluru, one of the major cities in Karnataka now has a train service to other major cities like Bengaluru, Mysuru started on 8 December 2007, but not directly to Hubballi. There is a proposed railway line between Hubballi and Ankola to fulfill this demand.
- Shivamogga-Talaguppa, Mysore-Chamarajanagar meter-gauge tracks has been converted to broad-gauge. There is a direct train service from Mysuru to Talaguppa which is very close to the world-famous Jog Falls.An announcement regarding the extension of Bangalore-Shivamogga Express (night train) to Talaguppa has been made in the Railway Budget 2012–13. There are 4 direct passenger trains running from Mysuru to Chamarajanagar and a Chamarajanagar-Tirupati fast passenger which connects to the state capital Bengaluru via Mysuru.
- District capital like Madikeri is not connected by a rail network. A rail link to Madikeri would be difficult since it is a hill station and any construction activity would harm the pristine environment.
- The district of Kodagu has no railway track within it. However a survey is under progress to link Mysuru with Kushalnagar in Kodagu district.
- Doubling of the track between Bengaluru and Mysuru (a line that receives very good patronage) is already completed.
- Though the state has Konkan Railway within it; it has remained isolated with no trains running from other parts of the state ( except Bengaluru )to places that exist on the Konkan Railway.

The superfast Shatabdi Express trains run from Bengaluru to Chennai and Mysuru. A Jan Shatabdi express runs from Bengaluru to Hubballi and this is the first train in India that has been fitted with a GPS (Global Position System) based Location Announcement System. Using this system, the passengers are announced apriori the arrival of a station. Konkan Railway is an engineering marvel; the construction of which included the bridge across the river Sharavathi at Honnavar of length 2,023 m and a tunnel at Karwar of length 2,960 m.

A high-end luxury train operated by the Tourism Department of Karnataka The Golden Chariot covers the places of interest in Karnataka and Goa under the tour name "Pride of the South". Places Covered: Bengaluru - Kabini/Bandipur - Mysuru - Hassan - Hampi - Gadag - Goa - Bengaluru. The same train covers the places of interest in Karnataka, Tamil Nadu, Kerala with a different tour name "Southern Splendour". Places Covered: Bengaluru - Chennai - Mamallapuram - Pondicherry - Tiruchirapalli & Thanjavur - Madurai - Kanyakumari - Thiruvananthapuram - Backwaters & Kochi / Allepey - Bengaluru.

== Water transport ==
Karnataka has 1 major port; the New Mangaluru Port and 10 minor ports; Karwar, Belekeri, Tadri, Honnavara, Bhatkal, Kundapur, Hangarkatta, Malpe, Padubidri and Old Mangaluru. The construction of the New Mangaluru Port was started in 1962 and completed in 1974. It was incorporated as the 9th major port in India on 4 May 1974. This port handled 32.04 million tonnes of traffic in the fiscal year 2006–07 with 17.92 million tonnes of imports and 14.12 million tonnes of exports. This was actually a slowdown in traffic at this port compared to the previous fiscal year mainly due to the reduction in iron ore exports from the Kudremukha Iron Ore Company limited. The port also handled 1015 vessels including 18 cruise vessels during the year 2006–07. The sector of Inland water transport within the rivers of Karnataka is not well-developed.

== Road transport ==
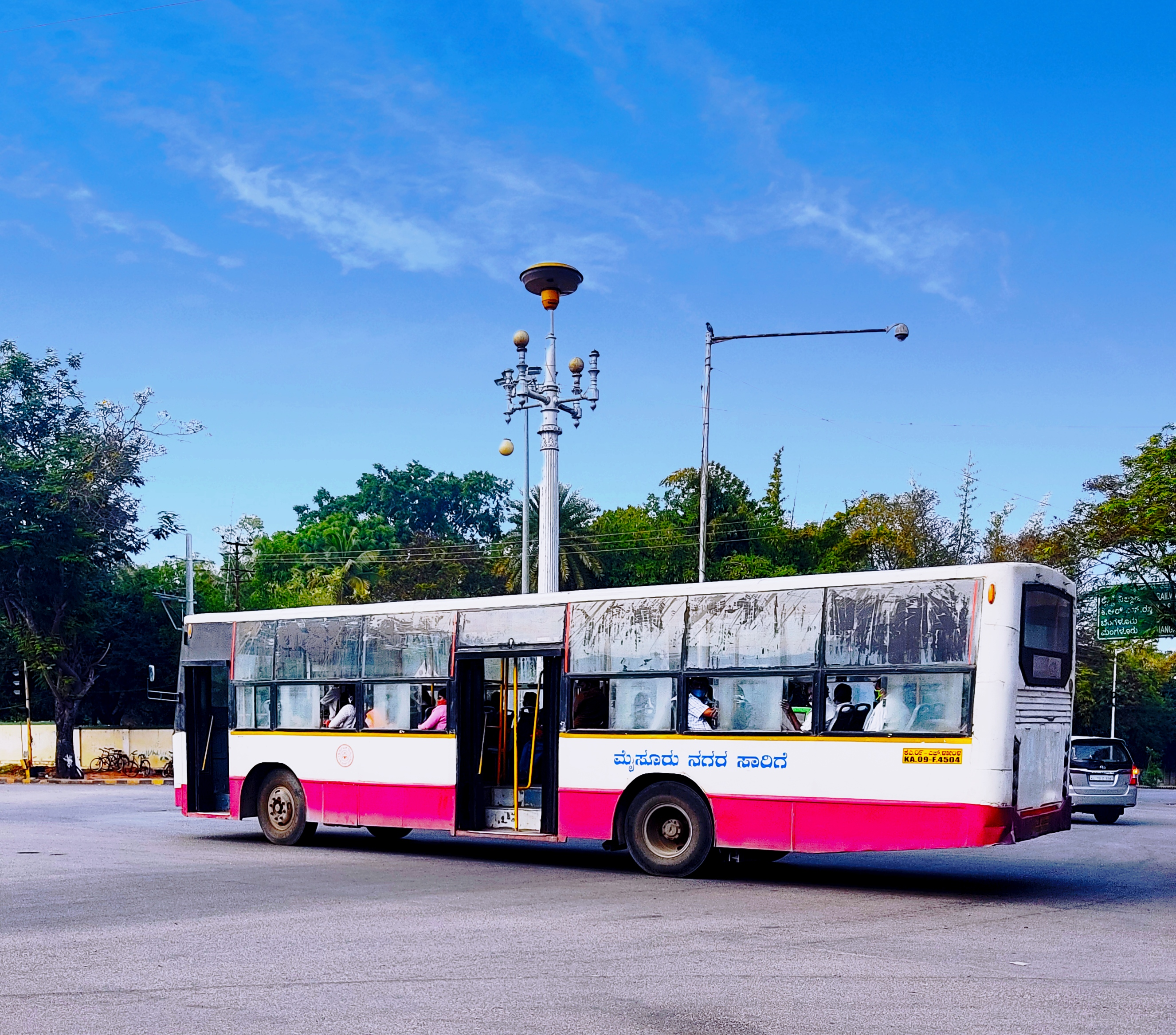
Nagara Sarige(City bus) in Mysore

Among the network of roads in Karnataka, 3973 km. of roads are National Highways. Karnataka also has state highways of length 9829 km.

The public bus transport in Karnataka is managed by the Karnataka State Road Transport Corporation. It was set up in 1961 with the objective of providing adequate, efficient, economic and properly coordinated road transport services. It operates 5100 schedules using 5400 vehicles covering 1.95 million kilometres and an average of 2.2 million passengers daily. About 25000 people are employed in Corporation For better management of public transport, Corporation was bifurcated into three Corporations viz., Bangalore Metropolitan Transport Corporation, Bengaluru on 15 August 1997, North-west Karnataka Road Transport Corporation, Hubballi on 1 November 1997 and North-East Karnataka Road Transport Corporation, Gulbarga on 1 October 2000. The reservation system is networked and computerised and tickets can be availed at designated kiosks in towns and cities. An online reservation system called AWATAR has also been devised by Corporation using which travellers can reserve tickets online.

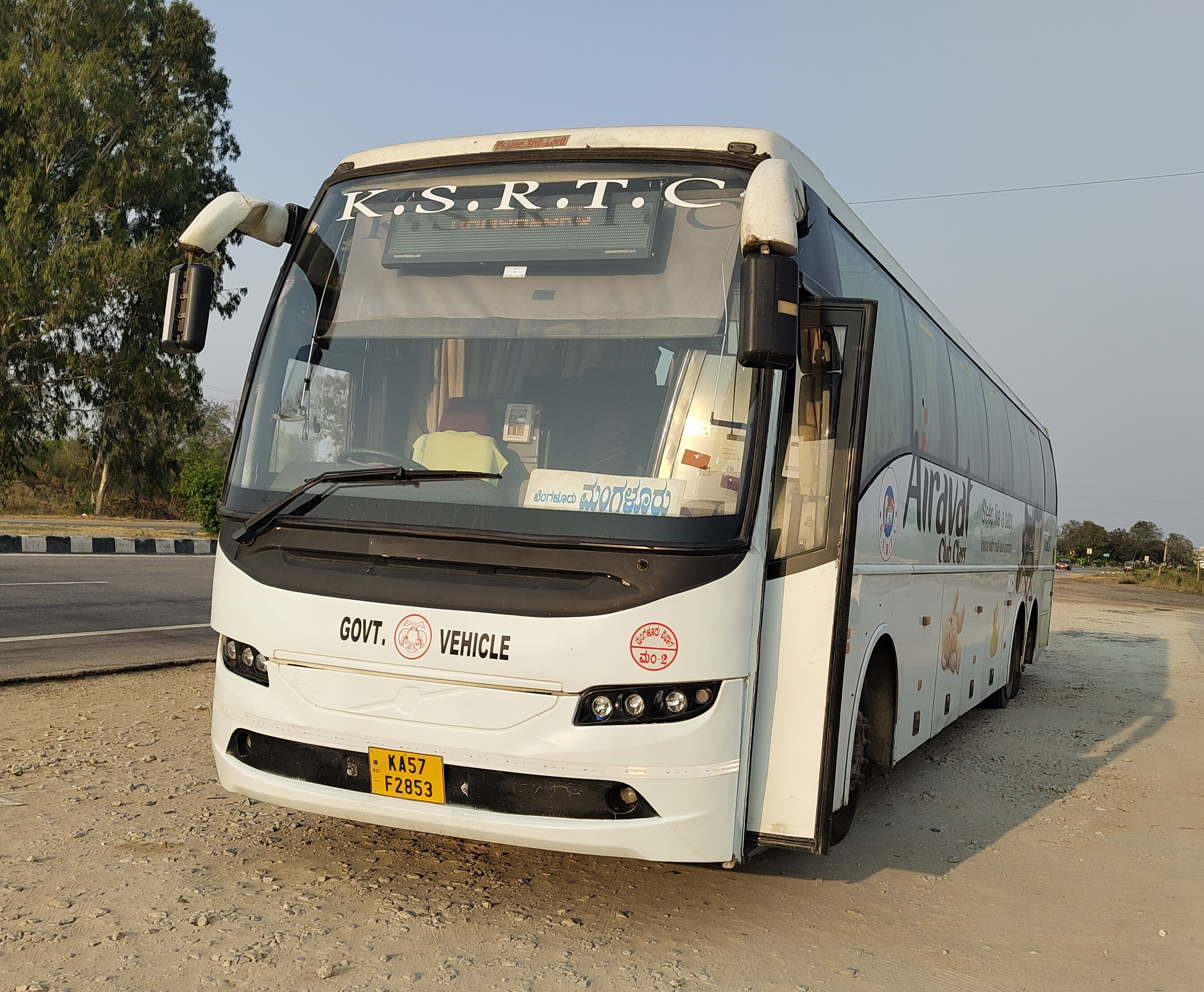
Airavat Club Class Volvo B11R bus

Corporation plies various categories of buses viz. Ambaari Dream Class AC Sleeper (Volvo),Ambaari Utsav Class(High-end luxury Volvo 9600 AC-Sleeper buses), Airavat Club Class 2.0 (high-end luxury Volvo 9600 buses), Airavat Club Class (high-end luxury Volvo, Scania, Mercedes-Benz multi-axle AC buses), Airavat (high-end luxury Volvo and Mercedes Benz AC buses), Ambaari Class(Corona AC Sleeper buses),Flybus(high-end luxury bus originating from Kempegowda International Airport),Pallakki Class(high-end Non ac sleeper bus service),Rajahamsa Executive Class (Deluxe buses built on Leyland, Eicher and Tata chassis), Karnataka Sarige (Bus service linking rural areas to major settlements as well as the cheapest alternative for inter-city or town routes. The buses are built on Tata and Leyland chassis). Grameena Sarige is another initiative by corporation to provide bus service to the rural populace of the state.Ashwamedha Classic Class(Point to Point Non stop bus service).

Buses run by private persons are allowed to operate in few districts of Karnataka.Inter district transportation are run by private operators, connecting capital Bengaluru and main cities like Mangaluru and Dharwad to district headquarters. Intra district transportation by private operators is currently allowed in Dakshina Kannada and Udupi districts. Omni bus and Maxi cabs are also other modes of road transportation in the state, especially where KSRTC does not buses or run very few.

== Urban transit ==
- Namma Metro, Bengaluru
- Hubli-Dharwad BRTS, Hubli–Dharwad
- MEMU train in karnataka

== See also ==
- Transport in India
