= Vayudoot =

Regional airline in India

| IATA | ICAO | Call sign |
|---|---|---|
| PF | VDT | VAYU |
- Founded: 20 January 1981; 45 years ago
- Ceased operations: 1 April 1997; 29 years ago
- Fleet size: 21 passenger aircraft 16 agricultural aircraft
- Destinations: Northeastern India
- Parent company: Indian Airlines; Air India
- Headquarters: Safdarjung Airport, New Delhi

Vayudoot (Hindi: वायुदूत, romanized: Vāyudūt, lit. 'messenger who rides on the wind') was a regional airline in India established on 20 January 1981 as a joint venture between the two state-owned carriers, Indian Airlines and Air India. The airline was headquartered at New Delhi's Safdarjung Airport and was originally conceived to serve Northeast India. The regional hub for the region was Calcutta and the airline flew to close to 30 destinations in this challenging area. Many of the airfields saw the resumption of commercial flights and fixed-wing aircraft after many decades of their absence.

The airline consistently lost money since its formation due to low occupancy. The government, struggling to find a solution to Vayudoot's continuing financial problems, considered both closure and privatisation as options, since the carrier's route and fleet structure made the operation unprofitable.

== History ==
In the late 1970s, the Indian government and its two airlines became aware of the increasing number of potential air travelers in many small towns around the nation. Vayudoot had started to expand India's domestic air transport network on a very large scale, with a completely new network designed to feed Indian Airlines' network at state capitals and other big cities. Therefore, all Vayudoot destinations, apart from its hubs, were completely new, not covered by existing Indian Airlines services.

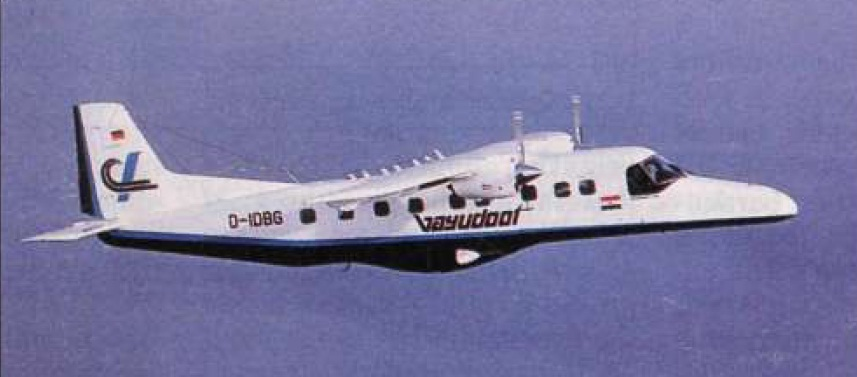
Vayudoot Dornier 228

Vayudoot began operations on 26 January 1981, India's Republic Day, in the remote north-east of the country, linking towns in states such as Assam, Manipur and Tripura. A journey such as one from Lilabari, North Lakhimpur, in Assam state to Ziro in the neighbouring state of Arunachal Pradesh could take a few days during bad weather, braving hazards such as avalanches in the hills and flooding in lower lying areas. The flight, on the other hand was as short as 12 minutes, though weather could cause disruptions because this was flying where visual contact had to be maintained with the ground/terrain in the absence of reliable aids for navigation. The weather caused poor visibility on account of heavy rains and low clouds and/or fog and could at times result in waterlogged runways. Many runways were unpaved strips, and facilities at these airports were very limited.

Its first aircraft were two F27s leased from Indian Airlines and linked 20 destinations. To keep costs low, Vayudoot did not serve in-flight meals and contracted out its ground handling services to local agents at all smaller destinations. Vayudoot supplied basic ground-handling equipment to the agents and trained their staff. Vayudoot started with retired flight crew of Indian Airlines to fly the HS-748 and F27 aircraft. As Dornier 228 were bought or leased, new pilots were recruited. The same held for the core engineering team, which comprised almost all of ex-Indian Airlines engineers.

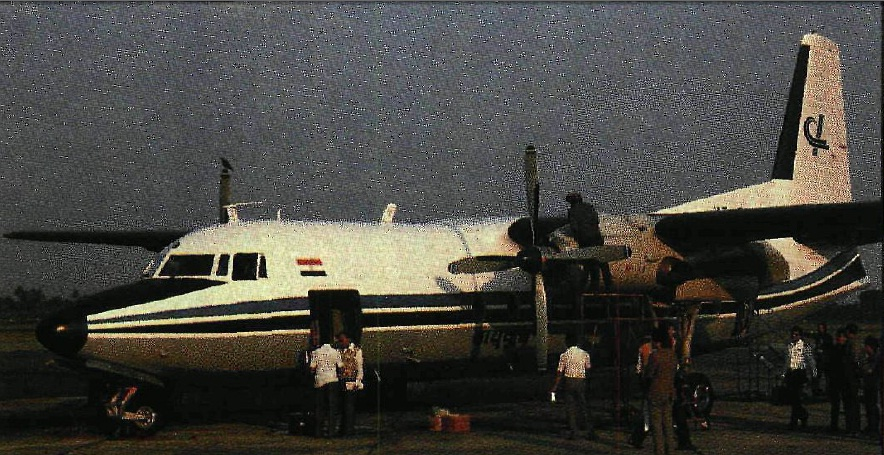
Vayudoot Fokker F27-100

Vayudoot became a public company in February 1983, owned jointly by Indian Airlines and Air India. At this time, its load factors were less than 50 per cent. Vayudoot's first Dornier 228 began service in 1985 on the Delhi-Raebareli-Lucknow route. A total of ten Dornier 228s were ordered by Vayudoot.

Subsequently, the services of Vayudoot were extended to other regions, charting 100 stations in the country earning the sobriquet "worlds fastest growing airline". Vayudoot quickly established hubs at Bombay (now Mumbai), Delhi, Madras (now Chennai), and Hyderabad. Sub-bases were, at some points of time, established at Bhopal in Madhya Pradesh and Guwahati in Assam. The lack of adequate traffic to sustain operations on all these routes adversely affected the company's financial performance. After a review, the number of stations on the operational network was brought down to 48 on 31 March 1991. Vayudoot was then focused on consolidating its operations and rationalising its fare structure rather than embark on large-scale expansion of its network. Its operations were again primarily restricted to the Northeastern region and other inaccessible areas.

Vayudoot also operated an Agro Aviation Division which was involved in aerial spraying operations, seeding and afforestation operations.

Vayudoot's financial performance continued to deteriorate which finally led to the dissolution of the company and merger of its assets into Indian Airlines in 1993. On 1 April 1997 its flight operations were transferred to Alliance Air, which is a newly formed subsidiary of Indian Airlines since 1996 and its employees were absorbed into Indian Airlines and Air India.

=== Night Air Mail Service ===
In 1985, Vayudoot started operating the Inland Night Air Mail Service (NAMS), a domestic overnight airmail service for the Indian Postal Service. The facility of this Vayudoot airmail service was also extended to a private courier. Every night, flights from the major metropolitan cities of India converged upon Nagpur Airport in the centre of the country. Usually the routes were:

- Delhi-Jaipur-Nagpur
- Calcutta-Varanasi-Nagpur
- Bombay-Nagpur
- Madras-Hyderabad-Nagpur

Despite a successful run of over a year, the service was discontinued because of demanding nature of the operation. The unpressurized Dornier 228 was limited to an altitude of 10,000 ft. The aircraft was dependent on ground-based en route navigational facilities and these were few and far between on many of the legs. Flying exclusively at night and negotiating violent storms called Kal baisakhi, followed by the Monsoon and in the absence of Radio navigation aids it became advisable to discontinue the operation.

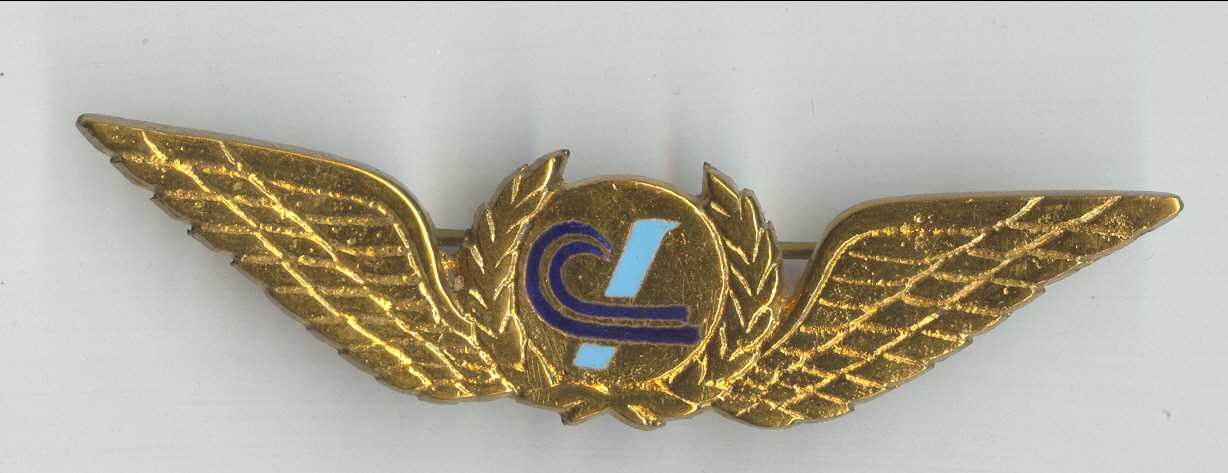
Vayudoot Crew Wings

During the early 1990s, Vayudoot used leased aircraft from Royal Nepal Airlines and Ariana Afghan Airlines to run night metro flights between New Delhi, Bombay and Bangalore. Aircraft such as the Boeing 757 and Boeing 727 were used.

== Destinations ==
From 1980s until 1990s, Vayudoot flew to over 100 destinations within India during its existence.

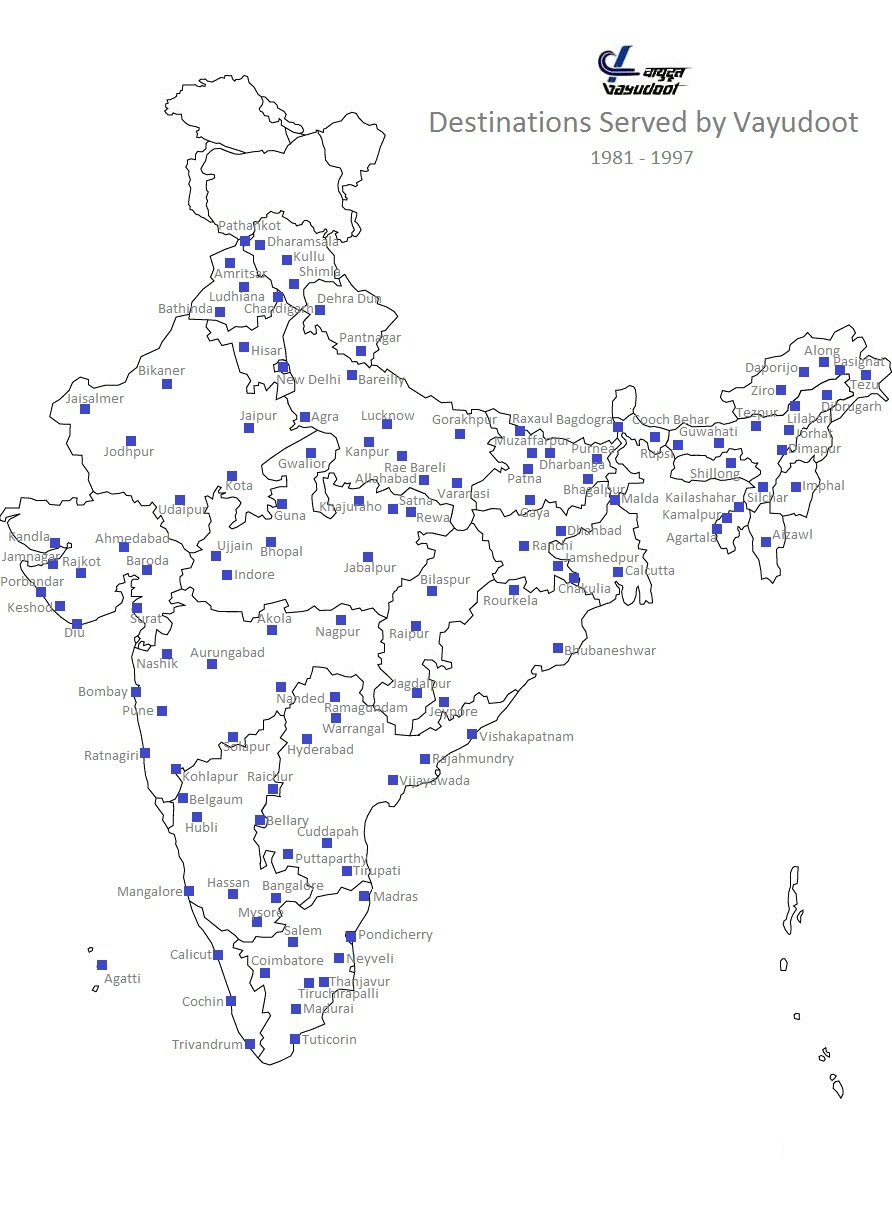
All Vayudoot Destinations Served

- Andhra Pradesh
  - Cuddapah – Cuddapah Airport
  - Hyderabad – Begumpet Airport
  - Puttaparthi – Sri Sathya Sai Airport
  - Rajamahendravaram – Rajamahendravaram Airport
  - Ramagundam – Ramagundam Airport
  - Tirupati – Tirupati Airport
  - Vijayawada – Vijayawada Airport
  - Visakhapatnam – Visakhapatnam Airport
  - Warangal – Warangal Airport
- Arunachal Pradesh
  - Along – Along Airport
  - Daporijo – Daporijo Airport
  - Pasighat – Pasighat Airport
  - Tezu– Tezu Airport
  - Ziro – Ziro Airport
- Assam
  - Dibrugarh – Dibrugarh Airport
  - Guwahati – Lokpriya Gopinath Bordoloi International Airport
  - Jorhat – Jorhat Airport
  - North Lakhimpur – Lilabari Airport
  - Dhubri – Rupsi Airport
  - Silchar – Silchar Airport
  - Tezpur – Tezpur Airport
- Daman and Diu
  - Diu – Diu Airport
- Delhi
  - Indira Gandhi International Airport
- Gujarat
  - Ahmedabad – Sardar Vallabhbhai Patel International Airport
  - Baroda – Civil Airport Harni
  - Jamnagar – Jamnagar Airport
  - Kandla – Kandla Airport
  - Keshod – Keshod Airport
  - Porbandar – Porbandar Airport
  - Rajkot – Rajkot Airport
  - Surat – Surat Airport
- Haryana
  - Chandigarh – Chandigarh Airport
  - Hisar – Hisar Airport
- Himachal Pradesh
  - Dharamsala – Gaggal Airport
  - Kullu – Bhuntar Airport
  - Shimla – Shimla Airport
- Karnataka
  - Bangalore – HAL Airport
  - Belgaum – Belgaum Airport
  - Bellary – Bellary Airport
  - Mangalore – Mangalore Airport
  - Hubli – Hubli Airport
  - Hassan – Hassan Airport
  - Raichur – Raichur Airport
  - Mysore – Mysore Airport
- Kerala
  - Calicut – Calicut Airport
  - Kochi – Willingdon Island Airport (now INS Garuda)
  - Trivandrum – Trivandrum Airport
- Lakshadweep
  - Agatti – Agatti Aerodrome
- Madhya Pradesh
  - Bhopal – Raja Bhoj Airport
  - Guna – Guna Airport
  - Gwalior – Gwalior Airport
  - Indore – Devi Ahilyabai Holkar Airport
  - Jabalpur – Jabalpur Airport
  - Khajuraho – Khajuraho Airport
  - Rewa – Rewa Airport
  - Satna – Satna Airport
  - Ujjain – Ujjain Airport
  - Bilaspur – Bilaspur (Chakarbhata) Airport
  - Raipur – Raipur (Mana) Airport
- Maharashtra
  - Akola – Akola Airport
  - Aurangabad – Aurangabad Airport
  - Kolhapur – Kolhapur Airport
  - Mumbai – Chhatrapati Shivaji International Airport
  - Nagpur – Nagpur Airport
  - Nanded – Nanded Airport
  - Nashik – Gandhinagar Airport
  - Pune – Pune International Airport
  - Ratnagiri – Ratnagiri Airport
  - Solapur – Solapur Airport
- Meghalaya
  - Shillong – Barapani Airport
- Mizoram
  - Aizawl – Lengpui Airport
- Odisha
  - Bhubaneswar– Bhubaneswar Airport
  - Jeypore – Jeypore Airport
  - Rourkela – Rourkela Airport
- Puducherry
  - Puducherry – Puducherry Airport
- Punjab
  - Amritsar – Amritsar airport
  - Bhatinda – Bathinda Airport
  - Ludhiana – Ludhiana Airport
  - Pathankot – Pathankot Airport
- Rajasthan
  - Jaipur – Jaipur International Airport
  - Jaisalmer – Jaisalmer Airport
- Tamil Nadu
  - Chennai – Chennai International Airport
  - Coimbatore – Coimbatore International Airport
  - Neyveli – Neyveli Airport
  - Thanjavur – Thanjavur Air Force Station
  - Thoothukudi – Tuticorin Airport
  - Salem – Salem Airport
  - Madurai – Madurai Airport
  - Thiruchchirapalli – Tiruchirappalli International Airport
  - Vellore – Vellore Airport
  - Hosur – Hosur Aerodrome
  - Ulundurpettai – Ulundurpettai airport
  - Karaikudi – Chettinad airport
- Tripura
  - Agartala – Agartala Airport
- Uttarakhand
  - Dehra Dun – Jolly Grant Airport
  - Pantnagar – Pantnagar Airport
- West Bengal
  - Cooch Behar – Cooch Behar Airport
  - Kolkata – Netaji Subhash Chandra Bose International Airport

== Accident/Incidents ==
The airline had four safety incidents during its operational history, including two crashes which resulted in a total of 45 fatalities.

- 22 September 1988 – A Dornier 228 (registered VT-EJT) crashed in Aurungabad and was written off due to a heavy landing. None of the passengers or crew were injured.
- 23 September 1988 – A Fokker F27 (registered VT-DMB) hit a high lift catering truck during taxi at Calcutta. The truck hit the left hand outer wing of the F27. Part of the wing and half of the aileron were cut away. The three catering truck occupants were seriously injured in the event. None of the 39 passengers or 4 crew were injured.
- 19 October 1988 – A Fokker F27 (registered VT-DMC) was on a scheduled flight from Silchar to Guwahati when it disappeared on approach to the airport. The aircraft undershot the runway in inclement weather. All 31 passengers and 3 crew died in the crash.
- 23 September 1989 – A Dornier 228 (registered VT-EJF) was on a scheduled flight from Pune to Hyderabad when the aircraft entered a steep descent and crashed into the reservoir behind the Ujani Dam. Isolated thunderstorms with localised heavy rain were reported in the area. It is believed that the aircraft entered a microburst and stalled. The aircraft was said to be in a steep dive before it crashed into the reservoir. All 8 passengers and 3 crew died in the crash.

== Fleet ==
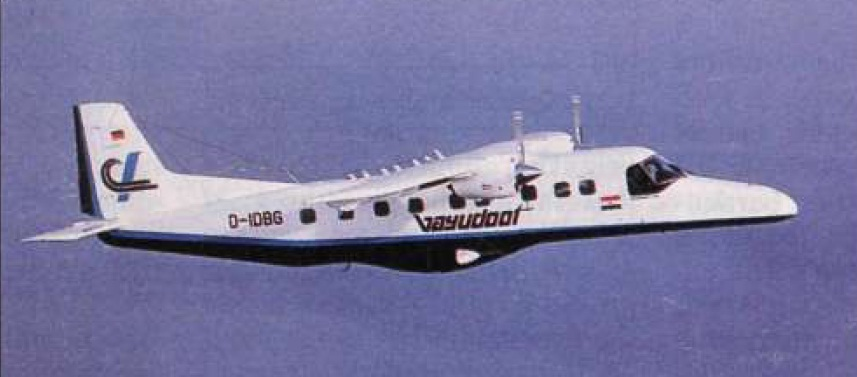
Vayudoot Dornier 228-201

As of March 1991, Vayudoot's passenger services had a total fleet of 23 aircraft.

- 10 Dornier 228-201
- 8 Avro 748
- 5 Fokker F27-100 "Friendship"

Its Agro Aviation Division had a fleet of one helicopter and sixteen aircraft.
