= List of airports in Karnataka =

Below is the list of airports in Karnataka.

Sl. no.	Location	ICAO	IATA	Airport name
International airports
1	Bengaluru	VOBL	BLR	Kempegowda International Airport
2	Mangaluru	VOML	IXE	Mangaluru International Airport
Domestic airports
3	Belgaum	VOBM	IXG	Belgaum Airport
4	Hubli-Dharwad	VOHB	HBX	Hubli Airport
5	Kalaburagi	VOGB	GBI	Kalaburagi Airport
6	Bidar	VOBR	IXX	Bidar Airport
7	Ballari	VOJV	VDY	Jindal Vijayanagar Airport
8	Mysore	VOMY	MYQ	Mysore Airport
9	Shimoga	VOSH	RQY	Kuvempu Airport
Military airbase / flying school
10	Bengaluru	VOBG		HAL Airport
11	Bengaluru	VOJK		Jakkur Aerodrome
12	Bengaluru	VOYK		Yelahanka Air Force Station
13	Belgaum	VOBM		Sambra Air Force Station
14	Kolar	-		Kolar Rapid Action Force
15	Bidar	VOBR		Bidar Air Force Station
16	Chitradurga	----		Chitradurga Aeronautical Test Range
Private airports
17	Harihara	VO52		Harihara Airport
18	Koppal	VOBK		Baldota Koppal Aerodome
19	Sedam			Sedam Airport
Future airports
20	Ballari	VOBI	BEP	New Ballari Airport
21	Bijapur			Bijapur Airport
22	Hassan			Hassan Airport
23	Ankola	VOGA	KWR	Ankola Airport
24	Raichur	VORR		Raichur Airport
25	Udupi	VORR		Udupi International Airport
26	Vijayapura			Vijayapura Airport

== Map ==
Airports in Karnataka
