= Sathyamangala =

Satyamangala
- Neighbourhood
- Interactive map of Satyamangala
- Location in Karnataka, India Satyamangala (India)
- Coordinates: 13.0201°N 76.12°E
- Country: India
- State: Karnataka
- District: Hassan
- Division: Mysore

Government
  - Type: City Municipal Corporation
  - Body: Hassan Municipal Corporation
  - MP: Shreyas M. Patel
  - MLA: Swaroop Prakash
- Elevation: 951 m (3,120 ft)

Population (2011)
  - Total: 18,002

Languages
  - Official: Kannada
- Time zone: UTC+5:30 (IST)
- Postal code: 573201
- Vehicle registration: KA-13
- Nearest city: Hassan
- Lok Sabha constituency: Hassan
- Vidhan Sabha constituency: Hassan

Satyamangala is a census town located at Hassan taluk in Hassan district in the Indian state of Karnataka. It is near ka -state highway 71 (hassan-arsikere Highway). There is a regional Ksrtc training depot, regional rto office hassan.

== Demographics ==
As of 2011 India census, Satyamangala had a population of 18,002 out of which 9,082 are males and 8,920 are females thus theaverage sex ratio of satyamangla is 982. Satyamangala has an average literacy rate of 92.45%, higher than the national average of 75.36%: male literacy is 95.63%, and female literacy is 89.2%. In Satyamangala, 1571(8.73%) of the population is under 6 years of age.

Religions in Satyamangla (2011 census)
Religion	Percent
Hinduism	95.42%
Islam	2.56%
Christianity	1.23%
Jainism	0.35%
Buddhism	0.03%
Other or not stated	0.4%
Distribution of religions

== Location ==
It is near to junction of dairy circle.There are major roads passing near this layout such as ring road, hassan arsikere highway, old BM road etc.

== Transportation ==
=== Air ===
The nearest airport is Mysore airport and the nearest international airport is Kempegowda International Airport. Hassan Airport is an airport under construction 10 kilometres east of the city, near the Boovanahalli village. The project was first rejected by the State government in 2012. It was again revived in 2021 with a budget of Rs 175 crore and will be taken up by the UDAN scheme. Government of India has granted the approval for setting up of 15 Greenfield airports in the country on 12 May 2015. Among 15 airports Hassan was also approved for Greenfield Airport.

=== Road ===
The major highway passing through the city is NH-75 (Bangalore - Mangalore). Other highways include NH-373 (Bilikere - Belur)/SH-57, SH-21 and SH-71. The K.S.R.T.C operates buses connecting Hassan city and the district with other parts of Karnataka as well as cities of neighbouring states. Two divisions of KSRTC, Hassan and Chikmagalur, maintain a total of 9 bus depots (6 by Hassan division, rest 3 by Chikmagalur division) in the district, with two being in Hassan city alone.

=== Rail ===
The nearest railway station from locality is Hassan Junction railway station which comes under the South Western Railway zone of the Indian Railways. It lies on Mangalore-Hassan-Mysore line.

== Geography ==
It has an average elevation of 24 metres. It is in the Bayaluseeme region of Karnataka,. There is a lake in this layout which is called as satyamangala lake. As it is outskirts of Hassan city it is mostly residential areas and not agriculture

== School ==
- Hassan public school
- Times gurukul school
- Chiranta School
