= Ratnagiri Airport =

Airport in Maharashtra, India

- IATA: RTC; ICAO: VARG

Summary
- Airport type: Public
- Operator: Maharashtra Industrial Development Corporation
- Serves: Ratnagiri, Konkan division, Maharashtra, India
- Elevation AMSL: 93 m / 305 ft
- Coordinates: 17°00′49″N 073°19′40″E

Map
- Location of the airport in Maharashtra RTC (India)

Runways
Direction	Length		Surface
Direction	m	ft	Surface
04/22	1,372	4,501	Asphalt
- Sources: WAD, GCM, STV

Ratnagiri Airport (IATA: RTC, ICAO: VARG) is a public airport located in Mirjole, Ratnagiri district, in the Konkan division of the state of Maharashtra, India.

== History ==
The airport was built in 1973 by the Public Works Department, Government of India. Vayudoot operated flights to Mumbai for a short while before discontinuing due to runway repairs, shortage of aircraft capacity and paucity of resources. The airstrip was transferred to the Maharashtra Industrial Development Corporation(MIDC) for upgradation, expansion and maintenance in 1997. During the 2008 winter session of the state legislature, the Maharashtra State Cabinet decided to hand over the airport to the Indian Coast Guard for setting up an air station. It proposed to hand over 41 hectares of airport land and another 19 hectares of MIDC land to the defence ministry .

MIDC signed a memorandum of understanding (MoU) with the Airports Authority of India on 5 March 2019, to facilitate civil operations under the UDAN scheme of the Ministry of Civil Aviation. The MIDC agree to provide infrastructure for handling of aircraft and passengers such as building the passenger terminal and taxiway, while AAI would provide communication, navigation and surveillance (CNS) systems for air traffic management at the airport.

== Coast Guard Air Station (CGAS) Ratnagiri ==
CGAS Ratnagiri was commissioned on 26 March 2011 as the first full-fledged Coast Guard air station in the state of Maharashtra. The Air station will play a crucial role in maritime surveillance and search & rescue operations.

== Airlines and destinations ==
No scheduled commercial air service at this time. Ratnagiri Airport has been upgraded with coast guard air station, passenger terminal, night landing facilities and air traffic control tower. Commercial air services are scheduled to begin by mid 2026 under the Regional Connectivity Scheme of Airports Authority of India (AAI), after lengthening of current runway from 1300 m to 1800 m.
