= Climate of Kolkata =

Yearly conditions in Kolkata

Kolkata

Climate chart (precipitation, max. and min. temperature)
J	F	M	A	M	J	J	A	S	O	N	D
16 25 13	23 29 17	32 34 22	53 36 25	141 36 26	248 35 27	367 33 27	355 33 27	283 33 26	170 33 24	21 30 19	6.8 27 14
- █ Average max. and min. temperatures in °C
- █ Precipitation totals in mm
- Source: IMD
Imperial conversion
J	F	M	A	M	J	J	A	S	O	N	D
0.6 78 55	0.9 85 62	1.3 92 71	2.1 97 77	5.5 97 80	9.7 95 80	14 92 80	14 91 80	11 92 79	6.7 91 75	0.8 86 67	0.3 80 58
- █ Average max. and min. temperatures in °F
- █ Precipitation totals in inches

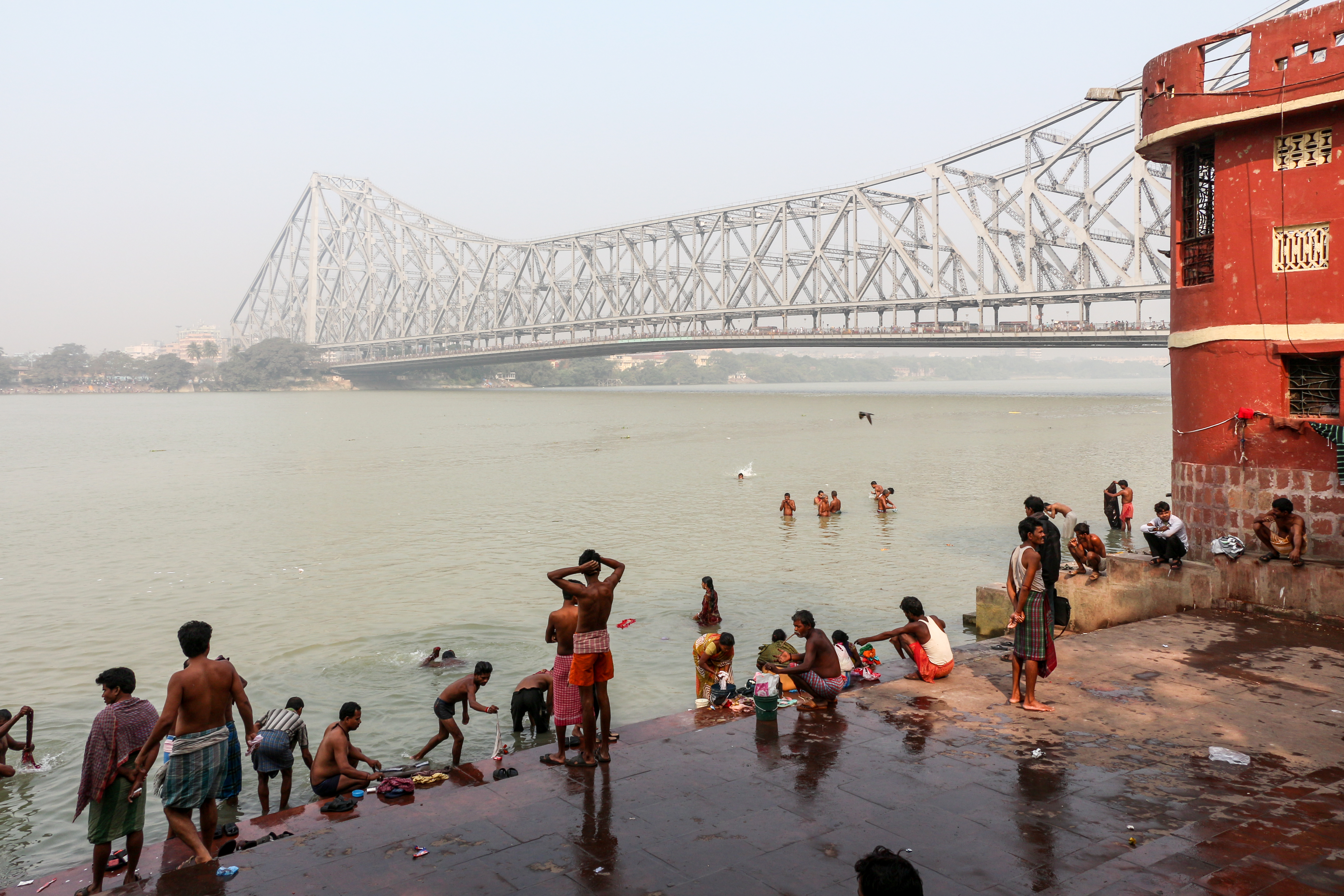
Howrah Bridge seen from Chotelal Ki Ghat, Kolkata, India.

Kolkata has a tropical savanna climate (Köppen climate classification Aw). The annual mean temperature is 26.7 °C (80.1 °F); monthly mean temperatures range from 18.8 to 30.6 °C (65.8 to 87.1 °F). Summers are hot and humid with temperatures in the low 30's and during dry spells the maximum temperatures often exceed 40 °C (104 °F) during May and June. Winter tends to last for only about two and a half months, with seasonal lows dipping to 9–11 °C (48–52 °F) between December and January. The highest recorded temperature is 43.9 °C (111.0 °F) and the lowest is 5 °C (41 °F). Often during early summer (mid-March to mid-May), dusty squalls followed by spells of thunderstorm and heavy rains lash the city, bringing relief from the humid heat. These thunderstorms are convective in nature, and is locally known as Kal Baisakhi (কালবৈশাখী, Nor'westers).

Rains brought by the Bay of Bengal branch of South-West monsoon lash the city between June and September and supplies the city with most of its annual rainfall of 1,711.5 mm (67.38 in). The highest rainfall occurs during the monsoon in July and August interchangeably. The city receives 2,234 hours of sunshine per annum, with the maximum sunlight occurring in April. Pollution is a major concern in Kolkata, and the Suspended Particulate Matter (SPM) level is high when compared to other major cities of India, leading to regular smog and haze. Severe air pollution in the city has caused a rise in pollution-related respiratory ailments such as lung cancer.

Climate data for Kolkata (Alipore) 1991–2020 normals, extremes 1901–present
Month	Jan	Feb	Mar	Apr	May	Jun	Jul	Aug	Sep	Oct	Nov	Dec	Year
Record high °C (°F)	32.8 (91.0)	38.4 (101.1)	41.1 (106.0)	43.3 (109.9)	43.7 (110.7)	43.9 (111.0)	39.9 (103.8)	38.4 (101.1)	38.9 (102.0)	39.0 (102.2)	34.9 (94.8)	32.5 (90.5)	43.9 (111.0)
Mean maximum °C (°F)	29.8 (85.6)	33.9 (93.0)	37.5 (99.5)	38.8 (101.8)	39.0 (102.2)	37.8 (100.0)	36.0 (96.8)	35.3 (95.5)	35.5 (95.9)	35.3 (95.5)	33.1 (91.6)	30.0 (86.0)	39.8 (103.6)
Mean daily maximum °C (°F)	25.5 (77.9)	29.4 (84.9)	33.7 (92.7)	35.4 (95.7)	35.5 (95.9)	34.1 (93.4)	32.5 (90.5)	32.3 (90.1)	32.6 (90.7)	32.3 (90.1)	30.2 (86.4)	26.7 (80.1)	31.7 (89.1)
Daily mean °C (°F)	19.9 (67.8)	23.8 (74.8)	28.2 (82.8)	30.6 (87.1)	31.2 (88.2)	30.6 (87.1)	29.5 (85.1)	29.4 (84.9)	29.4 (84.9)	28.3 (82.9)	25.1 (77.2)	21.1 (70.0)	27.3 (81.1)
Mean daily minimum °C (°F)	14.3 (57.7)	18.1 (64.6)	22.9 (73.2)	25.7 (78.3)	26.8 (80.2)	27.1 (80.8)	26.7 (80.1)	26.6 (79.9)	26.3 (79.3)	24.4 (75.9)	20.1 (68.2)	15.5 (59.9)	22.9 (73.2)
Mean minimum °C (°F)	10.9 (51.6)	12.4 (54.3)	18.2 (64.8)	21.1 (70.0)	21.8 (71.2)	23.9 (75.0)	24.3 (75.7)	24.6 (76.3)	23.9 (75.0)	20.9 (69.6)	16.9 (62.4)	11.9 (53.4)	10.0 (50.0)
Record low °C (°F)	6.7 (44.1)	7.2 (45.0)	10.0 (50.0)	16.1 (61.0)	17.9 (64.2)	20.4 (68.7)	20.6 (69.1)	22.6 (72.7)	20.6 (69.1)	17.2 (63.0)	10.6 (51.1)	7.2 (45.0)	6.7 (44.1)
Average rainfall mm (inches)	15.4 (0.61)	24.6 (0.97)	36.8 (1.45)	55.0 (2.17)	118.5 (4.67)	276.7 (10.89)	371.6 (14.63)	372.1 (14.65)	325.0 (12.80)	179.6 (7.07)	32.6 (1.28)	5.6 (0.22)	1,813.3 (71.39)
Average rainy days	1.1	1.5	2.1	3.2	6.2	12.6	17.5	16.8	13.6	7.4	1.4	0.7	84.2
Average relative humidity (%) (at 17:30 IST)	62	55	51	61	68	77	82	83	82	76	68	65	69
Mean monthly sunshine hours	213.9	211.9	229.4	240.0	232.5	135.0	105.4	117.8	126.0	201.5	216.0	204.6	2,234
Mean daily sunshine hours	6.9	7.5	7.4	8.0	7.5	4.5	3.4	3.8	4.2	6.5	7.2	6.6	6.1
Average ultraviolet index	7	9	11	12	12	12	12	12	11	9	7	6	10
Source 1: India Meteorological Department (sun 1971–2000) Weather Atlas
Source 2: Tokyo Climate Center (mean temperatures 1991–2020)

Climate data for Kolkata (Dumdum Airport) 1991–2020 normals, extremes 1939–2020
Month	Jan	Feb	Mar	Apr	May	Jun	Jul	Aug	Sep	Oct	Nov	Dec	Year
Record high °C (°F)	32.5 (90.5)	37.3 (99.1)	40.6 (105.1)	42.8 (109.0)	43.1 (109.6)	43.7 (110.7)	39.2 (102.6)	37.7 (99.9)	37.5 (99.5)	36.8 (98.2)	36.0 (96.8)	33.0 (91.4)	43.7 (110.7)
Mean daily maximum °C (°F)	25.3 (77.5)	29.2 (84.6)	33.6 (92.5)	35.9 (96.6)	36.1 (97.0)	34.8 (94.6)	33.2 (91.8)	33.0 (91.4)	33.3 (91.9)	32.5 (90.5)	30.1 (86.2)	26.6 (79.9)	32.0 (89.6)
Daily mean °C (°F)	18.8 (65.8)	22.9 (73.2)	27.4 (81.3)	30.1 (86.2)	30.6 (87.1)	30.3 (86.5)	29.5 (85.1)	29.3 (84.7)	29.3 (84.7)	27.9 (82.2)	24.3 (75.7)	20.1 (68.2)	26.7 (80.1)
Mean daily minimum °C (°F)	12.9 (55.2)	16.9 (62.4)	21.9 (71.4)	25.2 (77.4)	26.2 (79.2)	26.8 (80.2)	26.6 (79.9)	26.5 (79.7)	26.2 (79.2)	24.1 (75.4)	19.3 (66.7)	14.3 (57.7)	22.2 (72.0)
Record low °C (°F)	5.0 (41.0)	6.1 (43.0)	12.1 (53.8)	16.6 (61.9)	17.6 (63.7)	19.2 (66.6)	20.1 (68.2)	21.1 (70.0)	21.7 (71.1)	15.7 (60.3)	11.7 (53.1)	6.1 (43.0)	5.0 (41.0)
Average rainfall mm (inches)	15.8 (0.62)	20.2 (0.80)	31.9 (1.26)	53.4 (2.10)	140.5 (5.53)	247.5 (9.74)	366.5 (14.43)	355.4 (13.99)	282.1 (11.11)	170.2 (6.70)	21.3 (0.84)	6.8 (0.27)	1,711.5 (67.38)
Average rainy days	1.1	1.4	2.3	3.5	6.6	12.4	17.6	17.1	13.0	7.1	1.1	0.7	83.8
Average relative humidity (%) (at 08:30 IST)	61	53	49	58	66	76	81	82	81	75	67	66	68
Source 1: India Meteorological Department
Source 2: Tokyo Climate Center (mean temperatures 1991–2020)

== Weather Monitoring Stations ==
Alipore is the major station, which is an international station. But there are also two stations at Dum Dum and Salt Lake.
