= Bijapur Airport =

Airport of Karnataka, India

Vijayapura Airport ವಿಜಯಪುರ ವಿಮಾನ ನಿಲ್ದಾಣ
- IATA: none; ICAO: none

Summary
- Airport type: International Airport
- Owner: Infrastructure Development Department, Government of Karnataka
- Serves: Vijayapura
- Location: Madabhavi, Bijapur
- Coordinates: 16°50′50.3″N 75°48′42.9″E

Map
- Location of the airport in Karnataka Vijayapura Airport (India)

Runways
Direction	Length		Surface
Direction	ft	m	Surface
09/27	10,000	2,300	Asphalt

Vijayapura Airport, proposed to be named as Jagajyoti Shri Basaveshwar Airport, is an under-construction greenfield airport that will serve the city of Vijayapura in Karnataka, India. The airport is being built by the Karnataka State Industrial and Infrastructure Development Corporation (KSIIDC) at a cost of Rs 220 crore. The project site is located 15 km from the city on 727-acre (2.94 km^{2}) of land in Madhabavi, located outside the city premises. The airport was expected to be ready by early 2023, but this has been postponed to Dec 2024, but even this deadline has now passed.

== History ==
In March 2007, the State government Cabinet approved construction of greenfield airports in Bijapur, Gulbarga and Shimoga to give a boost to the tourism industry. Nineteen companies had responded when the Government called for an Expression of Interest (EoI) in 2007 to develop the airports. In January 2010, the Karnataka government signed a Memorandum of Understanding (MoU) with infrastructure development company MARG Limited for developing a green field airport at Bijapur under a public-private partnership agreement to cater to ATR 72 aircraft. The airside development was to include a 2,500-square-metre (27,000 sq ft) terminal building, a 1,700 m-long (5,600 ft) runway, aprons, taxiways, hangars, isolated parking bay, a 15 m (49 ft) air traffic control tower, ground support equipment, fuel storage facilities and a fire station.

The project came to a halt in 2012, when MARG demanded an additional 1,000 acres of land to build commercial complexes near the airport to make the project economically viable. According to the government, this amounted to a breach of contract signed through the MoU. In 2013, the Government decided to abandon the PPP model and instead sought to partner with the Airports Authority of India (AAI) to complete the project. AAI agreed to build Bijapur airport but sought Rs. 50 crore from the State government to start site levelling work, but the State government failed to reply. In February 2019, the KSIIDC sought to develop a ‘no-frills airport’ at the site to boost tourism and business activities.

On 9 July 2020, the state cabinet gave approval for the project to be completed by the State Public Works Department. The first Phase would cost Rs 95 crore and was given a deadline of 18 months.

The first phase of development includes a 1900-metre runway, along with the associated taxiways and apron. A terminal building to handle 200 passengers during peak hours will also be built to handle ATR 72 type aircraft.

The second phase, costing Rs 125 crore, will be implemented after operations commence. The airport would be expanded to handle larger aircraft like the Boeing 737 and Airbus A320 based on demand.

== See also ==
- List of airports in Karnataka
