= Daporijo Airport =

Airport of Arunachal Pradesh, India

Daporijo Airport दापोरिजो हवाई अड्डा
- IATA: DEP; ICAO: VEDZ

Summary
- Airport type: Public
- Operator: Indian Air Force
- Location: Daporijo, Arunachal Pradesh, India
- Elevation AMSL: 229 m (751 ft)
- Coordinates: 27°59′00″N 094°13′00″E

Map
- Location within Arunachal Pradesh Location within India

Runways
Direction	Length		Surface
Direction	m	ft	Surface
07/25	924	3,030	N/A

Daporijo Airport (IATA: DEP, ICAO: VEDZ) is an airport located in Daporijo town in the state of Arunachal Pradesh, India. Daporijo used to have scheduled services in the 1980s and early 1990s from Vayudoot. The airport had flights to Guwahati and Dibrugarh on Dornier 228 aircraft. Currently, there is no scheduled commercial air service to the airport, although the airport is used by the Indian Army. The Airports Authority of India (AAI) plans to develop the airport for operation of ATR-42/ATR-72 type of aircraft.

== See also ==
Arunachal Pradesh

- North-East Frontier Agency
- List of people from Arunachal Pradesh
- Religion in Arunachal Pradesh
- Cuisine of Arunachal Pradesh

Military bases

- List of ALGs
- List of Indian Air Force stations
- India-China military deployment on LAC
- List of disputed India-China areas
- Tianwendian
- Ukdungle

Borders

- Line of Actual Control (LAC)
- Borders of China
- Borders of India

Conflicts

- Sino-Indian conflict
- List of disputed territories of China
- List of disputed territories of India

Other related topics

- India-China Border Roads
- List of extreme points of India
- Defence Institute of High Altitude Research
- Independent Golden Jubilee Government Higher Secondary School, Pasighat
