= Kalaburagi Airport =

Airport serving Kalaburagi, Karnataka, India

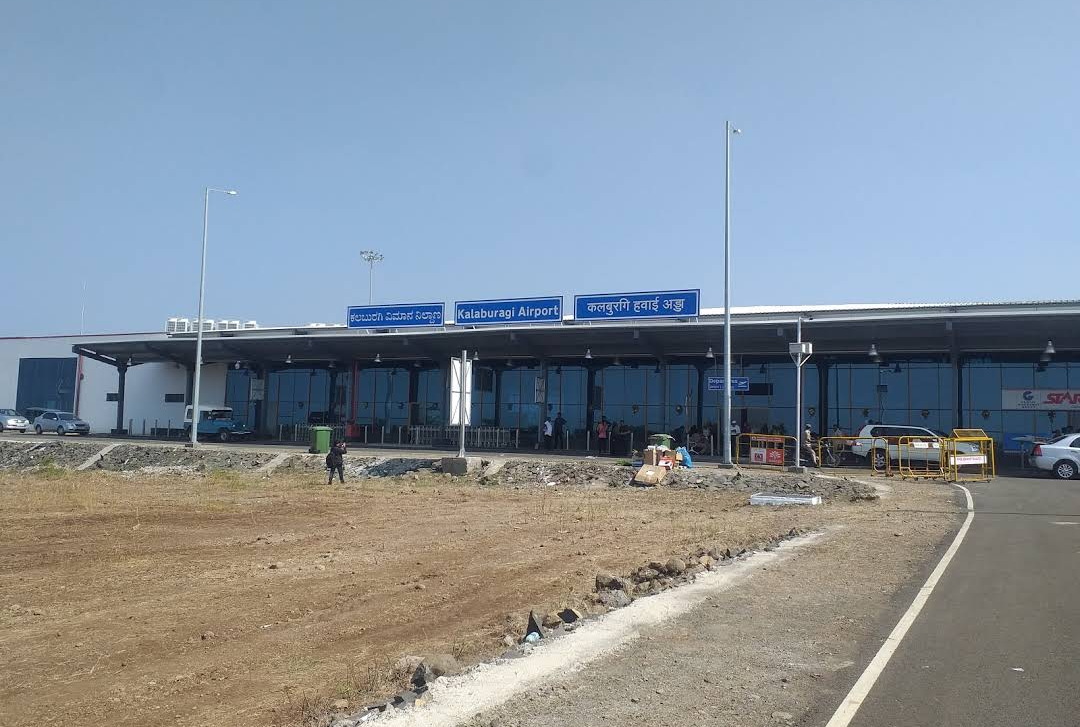
- IATA: GBI; ICAO: VOGB

Summary
- Airport type: Public
- Owner: Airports Authority of India
- Operator: Airports Authority of India
- Serves: Kalaburagi
- Location: Srinivas Saradagi, Kalaburagi district, Karnataka, India
- Elevation AMSL: 479 m (1,572 ft)
- Coordinates: 17°18′28″N 76°57′29″E
- Website: Kalaburagi Airport

Map
- Location within Karnataka Location within India

Runways
Direction	Length		Surface
Direction	ft	m	Surface
09/27	10,417	3,175	Asphalt

Statistics (April 2025 – March 2026)
- Passengers: 13,966 (▼54.8%)
- Aircraft movements: 453 (▼46.8%)
- Cargo tonnage: 0 ( 0%)
- Source: AAI

Kalaburagi Airport (IATA: GBI, ICAO: VOGB) is a domestic airport serving the city of Kalaburagi in Karnataka, India. It is located 12 km (7.5 mi) east from the city centre. It was built by the Karnataka State Public Works Department (PWD) with technical assistance from RITES Limited and is operated by the Airports Authority of India (AAI).

== History ==
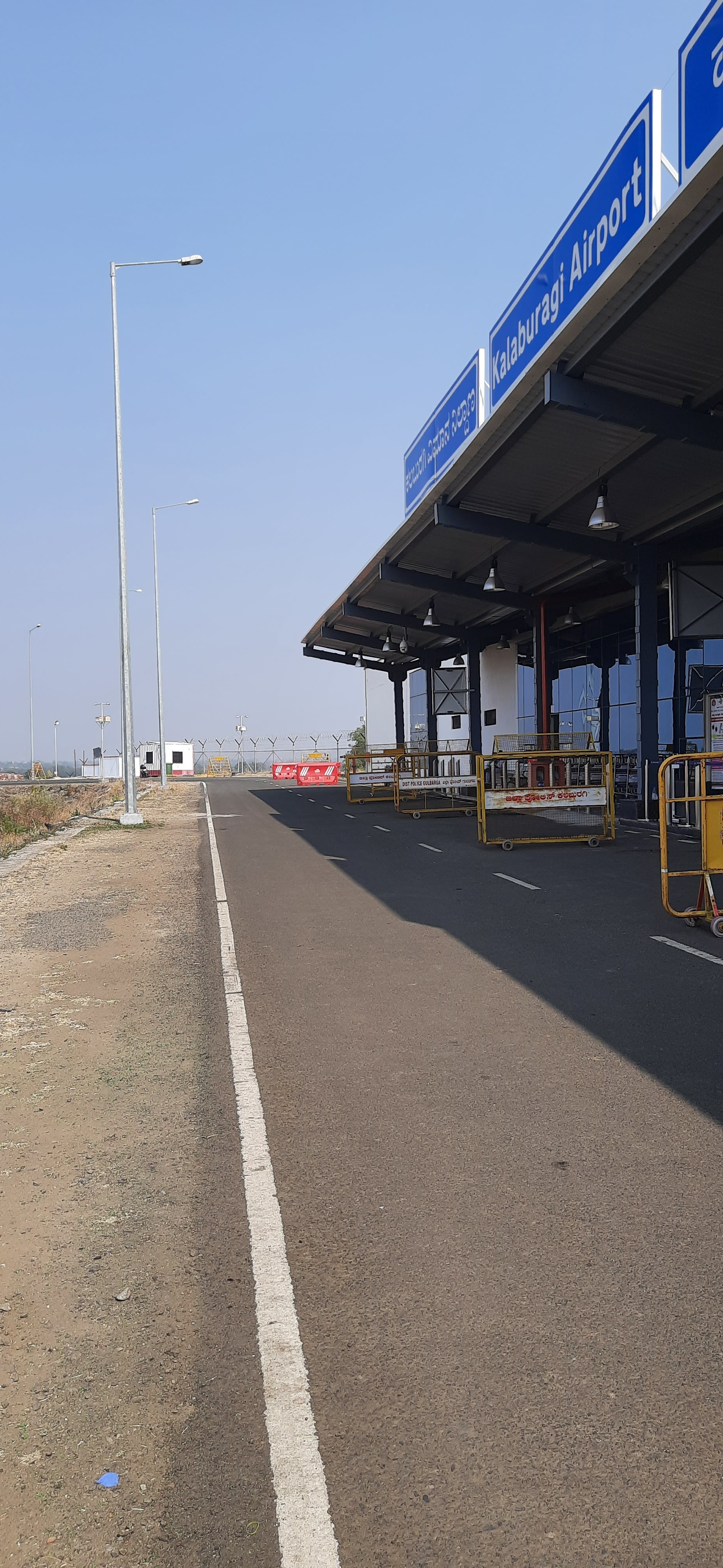
The terminal building of GBI Airport.

The ₹120 crore greenfield project was initially scheduled be built under Public–private partnership (PPP) with the government of Karnataka (GoK).

On 15 November 2007, the government of Karnataka awarded the Gulbarga Airport project to a consortium of Maytas Infra Ltd. (Now IL&FS Engineering and Construction Company Limited), NCC Infrastructure Holdings Ltd. (NCC) and VIE India Project Development and Holding on a Build–operate–transfer (BOT) basis. The concession period was to be 30 years, extendable by an additional 30 years, by mutual agreement.

Gulbarga Airport Developers Pvt. Ltd. (GADPL), a Special Purpose Company (SPC), was established to sign the Project Development Agreement (PDA) with the Infrastructure Development Department of the Government of Karnataka. The shareholding pattern of Maytas Infra, NCC and VIE in the SPC was 37%, 37% and 26% respectively. The agreement was subsequently signed on 2 April 2008. and the foundation stone for Phase I of the project was laid by former Chief Minister of Karnataka, Shri B. S. Yediyurappa on 14 June 2008.

Gulbarga Airport was to have started operations in the latter half of 2012 but was delayed due to financial mismanagement/disputes between the shareholders of Gulbarga Airport Development Ltd (GADL).

The state government terminated the contract in January 2015 for not complying with the Project Development Agreement (PDA), which required the completion of construction work by May 2012. The State Government then decided to complete the remaining work through its own Public Works Department. In September 2016, the State PWD started the first phase of work on the airport. This included extending the runway to 3.2 km. from the existing 1.9 km., to facilitate the landing of larger aircraft, and completing the compound wall. Construction of the terminal building and other facilities would be taken up in the second phase. On 26 August 2018, two Diamond Aircraft flew in from Hyderabad and landed on the runway at Gulbarga as a trial. Construction work was completed by August 2019 at a cost of Rs. 181 Crore, not including the cost of acquiring 742 acres of land. The airport was formally handed over to the AAI on 24 August 2019. The Karnataka Industrial Infrastructure Development Corporation (KSIIDC), on behalf of the Government of Karnataka, signed a Memorandum of Understanding (MoU) with AAI to develop, operate and maintain the airport.

The airport was inaugurated by Chief Minister of Karnataka B. S. Yediyurappa on 22 November 2019.

In 2021, Kalaburagi Airport saw steady surge in passenger and flight traffic with as many as 619 flights were operated between April and July 2021

== Airlines and destinations ==
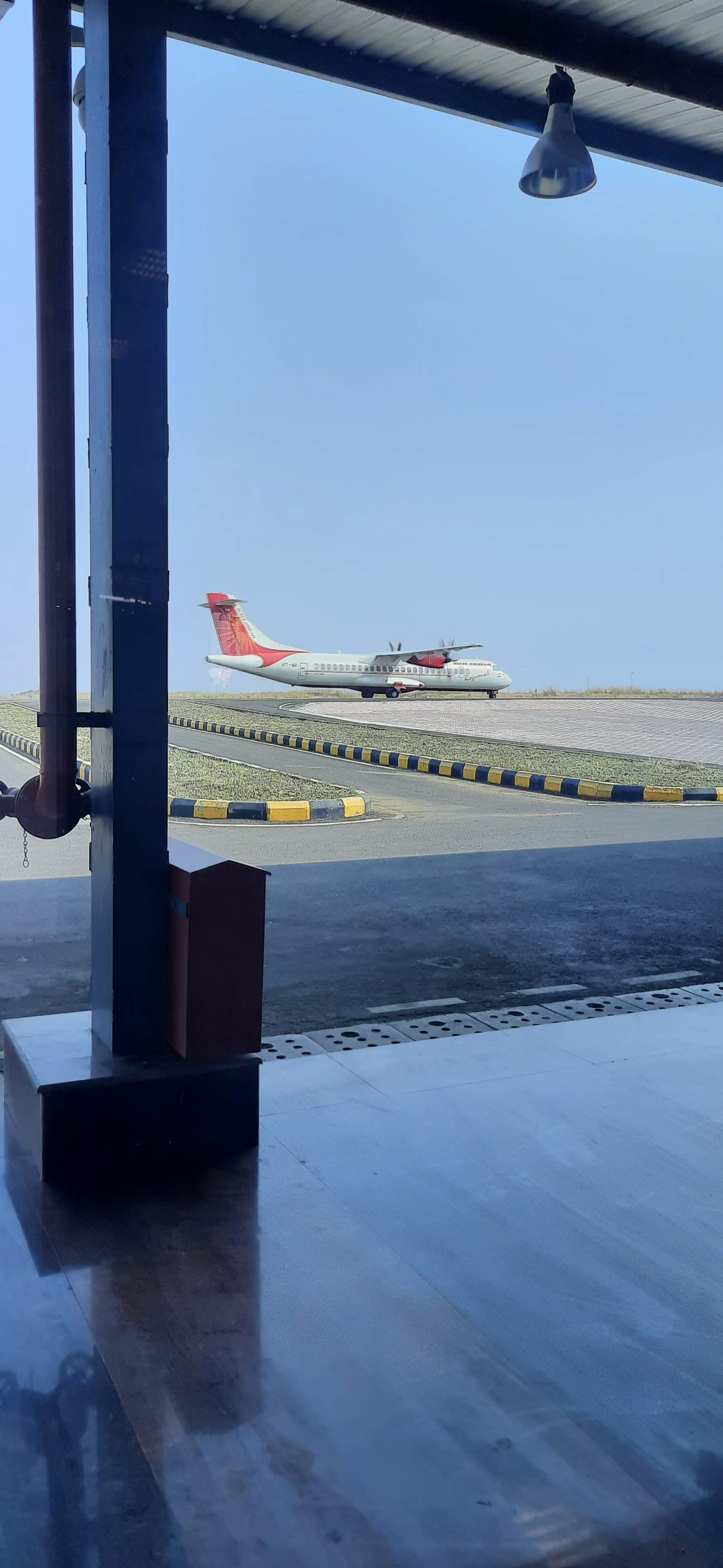
Apron area of the airport

Airlines	Destinations
Star Air	Bengaluru

== See also ==
- List of airports in Karnataka
