= Madabhavi =

- Village
- Location in Karnataka, India
- Coordinates: 16.80°N 74.95°E
- Country: India
- State: Karnataka
- District: Belgaum, Karnataka
- Taluka: Athani, Karnataka

Government
  - Body: Madabhavi village panchayat

Population (2011)
  - Total: 8,119

Languages
  - Official: Kannada
- Time zone: UTC+5:30 (IST)
- Postal code: 591232

Madabhavi is a village located in the Athani taluk of Belagavi district in the Indian state of Karnataka.

== Demographics ==
Population As of the 2011 census Madabhavi had a population of 8119, 4172 males and 3947 females, in 1619 families. There were 1067 children age 0-6, 13.14% of the population.

Education and Language Madabhavi had a literacy rate in 2011 of 65.95% compared to the state average of 75.36%. In Madabhavi male literacy was 73.43% and female literacy was 58.05%. Educational institutions include SGS College, madabhavi and Primary Govt School in both Kannada, the state language of Karnataka, and Marathi, the language of the nearby state of Maharashtra.

== See also ==
- Belagavi
