= Hubli Airport =

Airport serving Hubballi-Dharwad, Karnataka, India

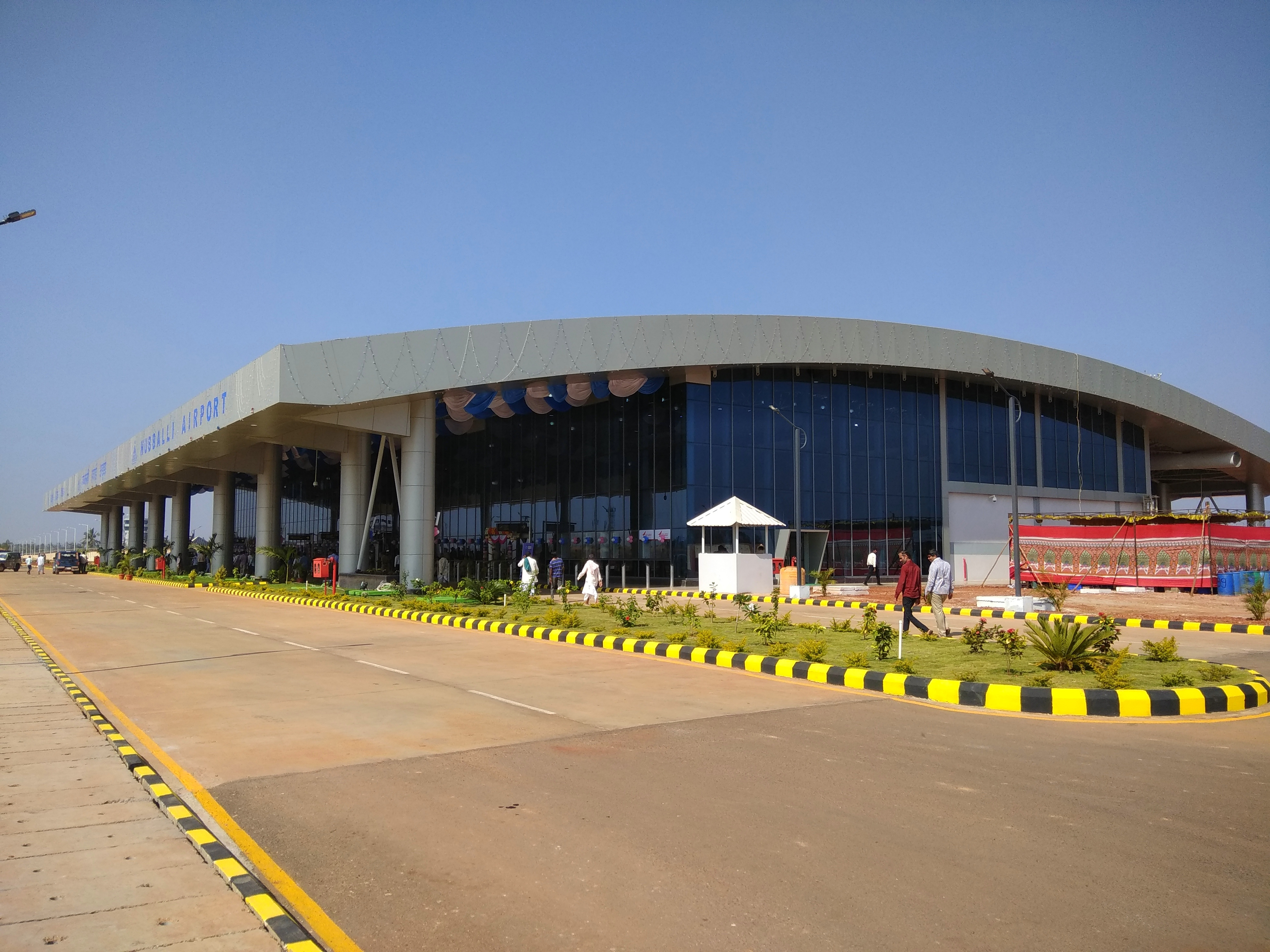
- IATA: HBX; ICAO: VOHB

Summary
- Airport type: Public
- Operator: Airports Authority of India
- Serves: Hubballi, Dharwad
- Location: Gandhi Nagar, Hubballi, Karnataka, India
- Opened: 1974; 52 years ago
- Elevation AMSL: 2,171 ft (662 m)
- Coordinates: 15°21′42″N 075°05′05″E
- Website: Hubli Airport

Map
- Location within Karnataka Location within India

Runways
Direction	Length		Surface
Direction	ft	m	Surface
08/26	8,500	2,600	Asphalt/Concrete

Statistics (April 2025 - March 2026)
- Passengers: 3,76,286 (▲8.6%)
- Aircraft movements: 4,319 (▼0.3%)
- Cargo tonnage: 224.7 (▼20.9%)
- Source: AAI

Hubli Airport (IATA: HBX, ICAO: VOHB) is a domestic airport serving the twin cities of Hubballi and Dharwad in the state of Karnataka, India. It is situated in Gandhi Nagar, 8 km (5.0 mi) from Hubballi and 20 km (12 mi) from Dharwad. It is connected with 6 destinations throughout the country. The airport has been made self-reliant in terms of electricity generation, with the commissioning of an 8 megawatt (MW) ground-mounted grid-connected photovoltaic solar plant in April 2021.

Beside the existing terminal, a new, larger terminal is being constructed to meet the rapidly rising traffic and demands. Its foundation stone was laid by Prime Minister Narendra Modi in March 2024, and construction began in the same month. It is slated to be completed by the end of 2026.

== History ==
The need for an Airport at Hubli was felt way back in 1954 when the region was under the Mumbai (then Bombay) presidency. Due to States Reorganisation Act, Hubli shifted from being a part of Bombay presidency to the newly formed Karnataka state. Consequently, land acquisition was delayed and done only by 1974. The construction and development of the airport was carried out by the Public Works Department (PWD) of Karnataka. Airport Authority of India took over the airport from Karnataka PWD during 1996 and flight operations resumed in the 2003 by Air Deccan. Kingfisher Airlines soon joined followed and operated flights to Bangalore and Mumbai. Spicejet operated from the airport from 2014 to 2019 during the time which it had to suspend operations twice respectively due to Runway repairs and aircraft overrun before permanently ending flights in 2019. IndiGo started operating flights to the airport from July 2018 and is the biggest airline operating out of the airport.

== Expansion ==
The Government of Karnataka signed a memorandum of understanding (MoU) with the Airports Authority of India (AAI) in January 2013 to develop the airport. Accordingly, 55 acres (0.22 km^{2}) of land were acquired by the State Government and handed over to the AAI.

The area of the airfield was increased to 369 acres (149 ha) and the runway was extended to 8,500 feet (2,600 m). A new taxiway, roofing, car parking, fire station and a new terminal building were also part of the upgrade project that would enable the operation of larger aircraft like the Boeing 737 and the Airbus A320. AAI constructed a new DVOR building and NDB building in 2016 and commenced the work on extension, strengthening and widening of the runway, taxiways and the isolation bay. A new ATC tower, technical block, fire station, a new apron for parking three aircraft, a 12.8 km. security wall with 17 security watch towers and a sewage treatment plant were constructed. On 12 December 2017 Union Civil Aviation Minister P. Ashok Gajapathi Raju inaugurated the upgraded airport terminal and other ancillary facilities. Minister of State for Civil Aviation Jayant Sinha and senior Airports Authority of India officials were also present on the occasion.

In order to cater with more traffic and future demands in the coming years due to the rapid expansion of population and urbanisation in the Hubballi-Dharwad metropolis, a new passenger terminal will be built on the north-western area of the airport, which will cover an area of 20,000 sq.m. with two levels, will be equipped with modern facilities and amenities and will have three aerobridges. It will be able to handle 1,400 passengers (700 arrivals and 700 departures) during peak hours. Other works included as part of the expansion is a new apron and a taxiway connecting to the runway, along with runway expansion to cater for larger aircraft like the Airbus A320 and Boeing 737, which at present operate on a limited scale due to the short length of the runway. The expansion project will be undertaken at a cost of around ₹ 275 crore and will be completed in two years, i.e., by 2025. Once completed, it will help the metropolis to be connected not only with domestic destinations but also with international destinations, which is a long pending demand of the people of northern Karnataka to make it the third international airport after Bangalore and Mangalore airports, as well as to reduce dependencies on both the airports.

== Facilities ==
=== Runway ===
Hubli Airport has one runway in use.

- Runway 08/26: 2,600 by 45 metres (8,530 ft × 148 ft), CAT I ILS equipped and in future will be equipped with RNP.

=== Terminals ===
The old terminal could handle only 3 ATR-72 sized aircraft. The apron could handle only three Code A/B sized aircraft. The old terminal was closed down and flight operations shifted to the new terminal after its inauguration.

The new terminal covers an area of 3600 square meters and is centrally air-conditioned. It can handle 300 passengers at a time during peak hours, i.e., 150 arrivals & 150 departures. The airport has passenger-friendly amenities like public address system, check-in counters, fire alarm, HVAC (heating ventilation and air conditioning), elevator, firefighting, CCTV, baggage scanners and car parking. It is also eco-friendly as the terminal has a skylight system for energy savings and a standing seam double insulated roofing system. The apron can now handle three A320/B737 or five ATR-72 sized aircraft at a time.

=== Cargo terminal ===
The cargo terminal is located east of the passenger terminal. It covers 65 square metres (700 sq ft). The Old Terminal Building was converted into Domestic Cargo Complex and started operations in March 2021. On completion it became north Karnataka's first dedicated domestic air cargo terminal.

== Airlines and destinations ==
Airlines	Destinations
IndiGo	Bengaluru, Chennai, Delhi, Hyderabad, Mumbai, Navi Mumbai, Pune
Fly91	Bengaluru, Hyderabad

== Statistics ==
Hubli Airport passenger traffic statistics
Year	Rank	Passengers	Growth	Rank change
2019-20	49	475,218	▲3.2%	▼4
2018-19	45	460,462	▲835.4%	▲19
2017-18	64	49,227	▲89.9%	▼1
2016-17	63	25,928	▼33.5%	▲1
2015-16	64	38,973		

== Other facilities ==
=== Solar power plant ===
A 8 megawatt (MW) ground-mounted grid-connected photovoltaic solar plant has been built by AAI at the airport. Hubli airport has been made self-reliant in terms of electricity generation with the commissioning of the plant in April 2021. Solar power generated here is being supplied to Karnataka Power Transmission Corporation's (KPTC) grid and then on to other airports including Gulbarga, Mysore, and Bangalore's HAL Airport. The project is located in about 38 acres of land on south of the runway. Over 400 solar panels have been installed in 24 acres of the land whereas the remaining portion has been used to set up transformers, rooms, and for other purposes. The solar plant will generate about 140 lakh units annually.

=== Airport hotel ===
Fortune Park Airport Road Hubballi owned by ITC Hotels is strategically located opposite to Hubli airport. The hotel also encompasses 2 restaurants.

== Connectivity ==
=== Road ===
The airport is connected to the city by Gokul Road. The National Highway 48 passes right next to the airport. The NWKRTC operates air conditioned bus services from Hubli Railway Station to the airport and a mini-bus service between Hubli Central Bus Terminus (C.B.T.) and the airport. The AC buses make ten trips a day and mini-buses 24 trips a day.

=== Rail ===
The nearest railway station is Unkal railway station which is located 7.5 km from the airport whereas the nearest major railway junction is Hubli Junction railway station, which is located 8 km from the airport.

== Accidents and incidents ==
- On 9 March 2015, a SpiceJet Bombardier Dash 8, operating flight SG-1085 from Bangalore with 74 passengers and 4 crew, landed on Hubli's runway in heavy rain, veered off the runway and came to a halt on soft ground with the left main gear collapsed. There were no injuries but the aircraft received substantial damage to the left hand main landing gear, propeller and engine.

== See also ==
- List of airports in Karnataka
