= Environmental issues in Kolkata =

Environmental issues in Kolkata refers to the air pollution, water pollution, garbage problems, and other problems of the natural environment prevalent in the city of Kolkata, the capital of the Indian state of West Bengal. It severely affects Kolkata's biophysical environment as well as human health.

== Air pollution ==
According to data released in 2009 by the Scientific and Environmental Research Institute, atmospheric suspended particulate matter (SPM) in Kolkata was 511. This made Kolkata the most polluted metropolitan city in India, followed respectively by Mumbai, Delhi and Chennai. In a 6-years long study completed in 2007, the Chittaranjan National Cancer Institute (CNCI) found that 70% of residents of Kolkata suffer from respiratory diseases, like lung cancer, dyspnea and asthma, caused by air pollution. According to the CNCI study, 18.4 cases of lung cancer per 100,000 people were reported from Kolkata.

According to data collected in 2010 by the Central Pollution Control Board (CPCB), Kolkata, along with Delhi, is among the worst affected Indian cities when it comes to air pollution. Between 2009 and 2011, the highest number of lung cancer cases in India were reported from Kolkata, Delhi and Mumbai. According to a report prepared by the Centre for Science and Environment (CSE), among the number of cancer cases reported between 2009 and 2011, the most frequent cases were of lung cancer with a share of 12%. According to an article published in The Telegraph, Kolkata has been nicknamed the "lung cancer capital of India". In the World Health Organization's (WHO) ranking of cities by air pollution, Kolkata ranks 25th among a total of 1100 cities.

Air pollution is high in Kolkata despite the city's relatively low rates of car ownership, compared to other large Indian cities, and its strong public transport. It may be possible to reduce Kolkata's energy emissions through measures that also save money, such as parking demand management and improved vehicle efficiency standards.

== Water Pollution ==
A 2003 report released by the Federation of Consumer Associations (FCA) found that much of the drinking water in Kolkata was polluted with human waste. According to this report, 87% of reservoirs supplying water to residential buildings were contaminated with human excrement. There were significant traces of faecal matter in 63% of faucets, and 20% of the water samples collected from various city hospitals were also found to be contaminated. The study reported that approximately one-fifth of the deep water wells and hand pumps operated by the Kolkata Municipal Corporation were polluted with human waste. The former director of the All India Institute of Hygiene and Public Health blamed the ongoing water pollution on a leaky sewer system and water pressure abnormalities.

== Subsidence ==
Subsidence is an increasing problem in Kolkata due to "demand of groundwater for drinking, agricultural and industrial purposes [which] has increased due to rapid urbanization, according to a 2022 paper submitted to the Indian Academy of the Sciences.

== See also ==
- Environmental issues in India
