= Belgaum Airport =

Airport in Belgaum, Karnataka, India

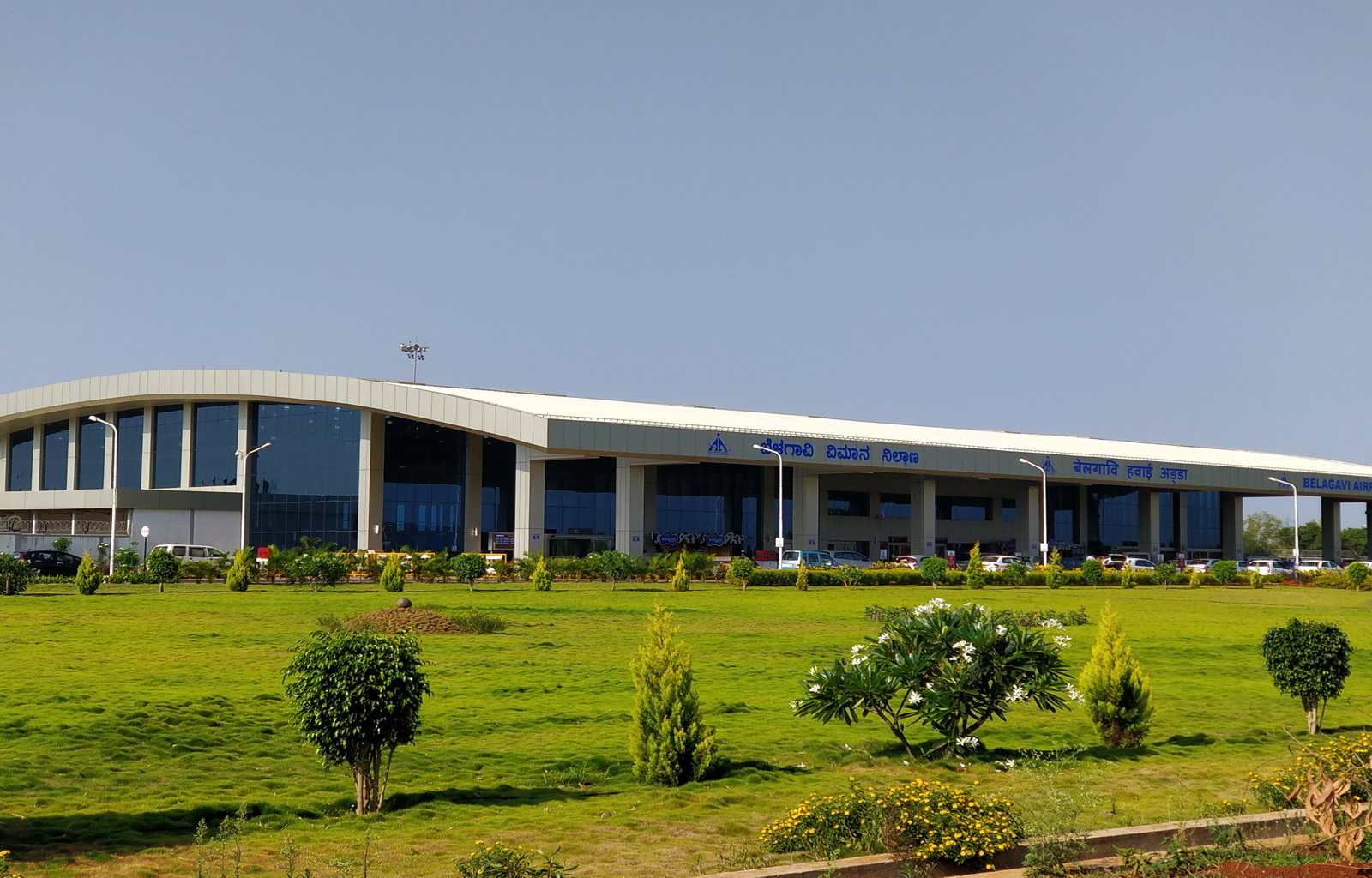
- IATA: IXG; ICAO: VOBM

Summary
- Airport type: Public
- Operator: Airports Authority of India
- Serves: Belgaum
- Location: Sambra, Belgaum, Karnataka, India
- Opened: 1942; 84 years ago
- Hub for: Star Air
- Elevation AMSL: 2,489 ft (759 m)
- Coordinates: 15°51′33″N 74°37′03″E
- Website: Belgaum Airport

Map
- Location of airport in Karnataka IXG (India)

Runways
Direction	Length		Surface
Direction	ft	m	Surface
08/26	7,546	2,300	Asphalt/Concrete

Statistics (April 2025 - March 2026)
- Passengers: 3,01,516 (▼11.4%)
- Aircraft movements: 4,414 (▼15%)
- Cargo tonnage: 8.7 (▼63.3%)
- Source: AAI

Belgaum Airport (IATA: IXG, ICAO: VOBM), also known as Belagavi Airport, is a domestic airport serving Belgaum, Karnataka. The current integrated terminal building was inaugurated by the then Minister of Civil Aviation, Ashok Gajapathi Raju on 14 September 2017. Beside the existing terminal, a new, larger terminal is being constructed to meet the rapidly rising traffic and demands. Its foundation stone was laid by Prime Minister Narendra Modi in March 2024, and construction began in the same month. It is slated to be completed by the end of 2026.

The airport also serves as an Indian Air Force station.

== History ==
Built in 1942 by the Royal Air Force (RAF), Belgaum Airport is the third oldest airport in Karnataka. The RAF used the airport as a training site during World War II, providing support to the South East Asia Command. The Directorate General of Civil Aviation (DGCA) took control of the airport in 1956, followed by the Ministry of Civil Aviation in 1962. During the 1990s, Belgaum Airport was served by East-West Airlines, Gujarat Airways, Indian Airlines, NEPC Airlines and Vayudoot. All airlines ended flights to the airport by the end of the decade.

Belgaum Airport saw the return of commercial flights in 2003, with Air Deccan providing service from Bengaluru. Air Deccan also flew to Kolhapur and Mumbai for some time. After Air Deccan completed its merger with Kingfisher Airlines in 2008, Kingfisher decided to end flights to Belgaum in June 2009. Nevertheless, expansion plans for Belgaum Airport were launched in 2010, when the Airports Authority of India (AAI) and the Government of Karnataka signed a memorandum of understanding. Kingfisher returned in January 2011 with daily flights from Mumbai, but it exited the market in November 2011 amid its own financial difficulties. SpiceJet arrived at Belgaum in November 2012 with flights from Bengaluru and later added direct flights to Chennai, Mumbai, and Hyderabad after Belgaum airport was expanded in September 2017. Spicejet served the airport till May 2018. After Hubballi airport was nominated under the UDAN scheme, Spicejet shifted all its operations to Hubballi which it operated from Belgaum Airport. The airport came into operation again after Alliance Air, a subsidiary of Air India began flight services to Bengaluru from 11 July 2018. This was a three times a week flight operated by ATR 72 type aircraft. Air India began service to Bengaluru with its Airbus A319 aircraft from 10 August 2018 on the remaining 4 days of the week thus connecting Belgaum with Bengaluru all 7 days in the week. Also this was the first arrival of the Airbus A319 in Belgaum.

In 2013, the Central Government cleared the expansion project. Work began in February 2015 at a cost of Rs 1.20 billion and took over two and a half years. It involved extension of the runway, construction of a new isolation bay, a taxiway, an apron for three A-320 aircraft and a new 22.5-metre tall ATC tower. The expanded facilities were formally inaugurated on 14 September 2017 and AAI commissioned the new terminal and apron on 16 October 2017.

In 2020, Union Minister of State for Railways Suresh Angadi requested that the airport be named after Kittur Rani Chennamma.

== Terminal and airfield ==
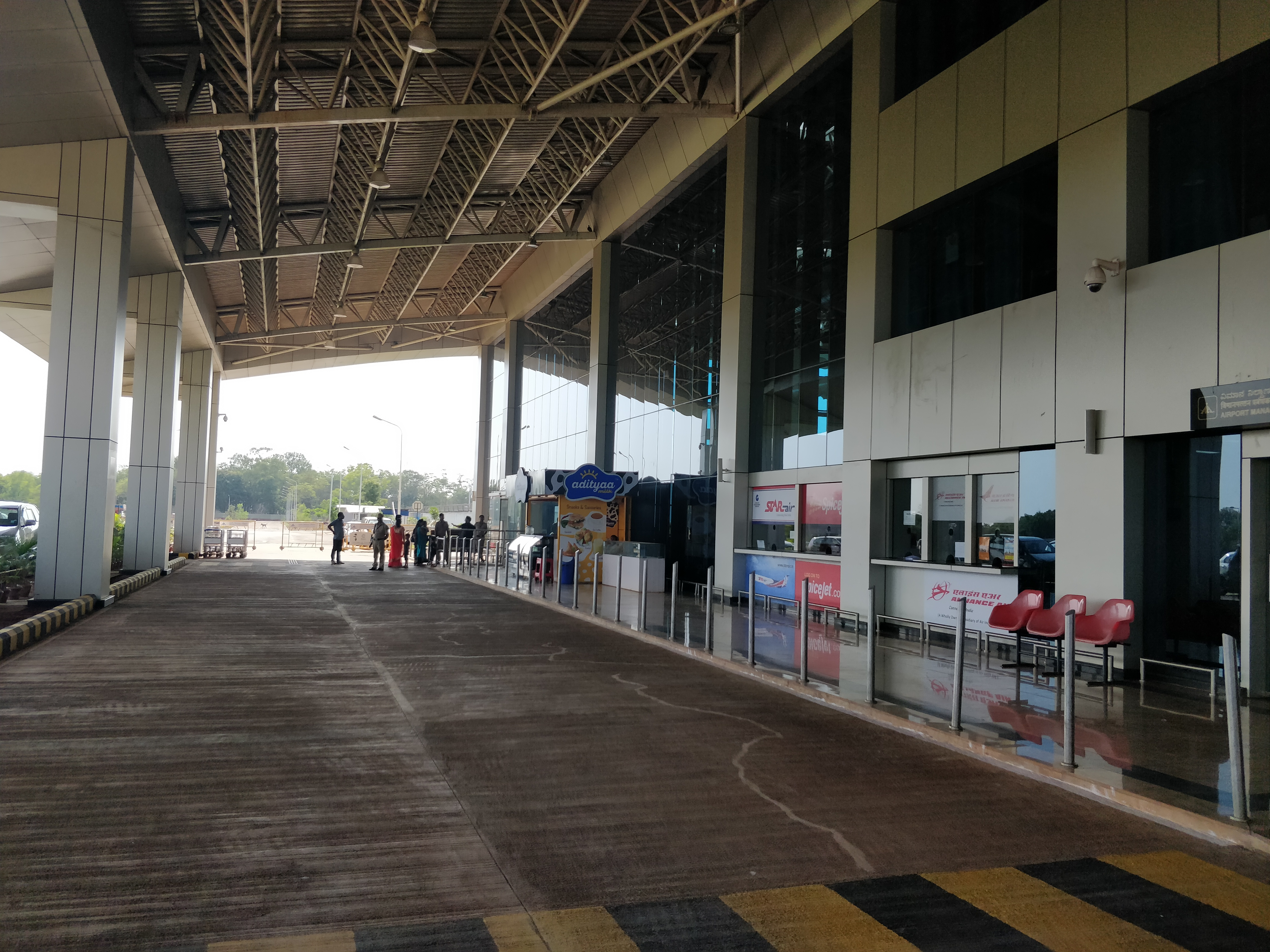
Airport Entrance and Ticketing Counter

A new terminal building was inaugurated on 14 September 2017 as part of the airport expansion project. The terminal building is spread over 3,600 square metres and has a capacity to accommodate over 300 passengers. It has two baggage conveyor belts and six check-in counters. It has an apron for parking of three Airbus A320 and Boeing 737 aircraft. The old apron has two parking stands designed for the ATR 72 and similar aircraft. There are also two additional aprons, one on the north side of the runway that serves as an isolation bay and one on the south side. These aprons are each connected by single taxiways to runway 08/26, which measures 2,300 by 45 metres (7,546 ft × 148 ft).

== Expansion ==
The Airports Authority of India (AAI) has decided to expand the airport in view of the rising traffic and future demands. A new passenger terminal building will be built, which will have an area of 20,000 sq.m., thereby making it bigger than the existing terminal covering 16,000 sq.m. by 3,600 sq.m. It will be equipped with all modern facilities and will have three aerobridges. It will be able to handle 1,400 passengers (700 arrivals and 700 departures) during peak hours. Other works included as part of the expansion is a new apron and a taxiway connecting to the runway, along with runway expansion to cater larger aircraft like the Airbus A320 and Boeing 737, which at present do not operate even though the existing new apron is capable of handling such aircraft types due to short length of the runway. The expansion work will be undertaken at a cost of around ₹ 230 crore, and is scheduled to begin from January 2024 with a deadline of completing in 2–3 years.

== Airlines and destinations ==
Airlines	Destinations
IndiGo	Bengaluru, Delhi, Hyderabad, Mumbai–Navi

== Air Force Station ==
Built by and originally under the control of the Royal Air Force, the Special Reserve Police of Karnataka took over the airbase in 1984. The air force station was a major base of air operations during Operation Vijay in 1961. Two years later, No. 1 Ground Training School at Jalahalli was moved to the base and renamed Administrative Training Institute (ATI) in 1980. In 2001, the ATI was renamed Airmen Training School (ATS). The focus of the base turned to providing Joint Basic Phase Training (JBPT) through the Basic Training Institute. JBPT is designed to teach recruits military values and orient them towards a life in the military.

== See also ==
- List of airports in Karnataka
- Aviation in India
