= Udupi International Airport =

Airport of Karnataka, India

Udupi International Airport (Proposed)
- IATA: none; ICAO: none

Summary
- Airport type: Public , GreenField
- Serves: Mangalore,Udupi
- Location: Near Padubidri and Yermal villages, Karnataka, India

Udupi International Airport or Padubidri International Airport is a proposed International greenfield airport, which will serve the district of Udupi in Karnataka, India. It will serve as an alternative international airport to existing Mangalore International Airport.

== History ==
The proposed Padubidri airport in Udupi district, Karnataka, had a history rooted in a long-standing, revived proposal to build a new international airport near Padubidri and Nandikoor, primarily driven by the need to expand airport infrastructure in coastal Karnataka. Initial efforts to build an airport were abandoned in the past due to political opposition and local concerns, with land originally considered for the airport being redistributed. But,In October 2025 there was momentum to build new airport between Padubidri and Yermal village. It is decided as Mangalore Airport which is just 45 km away needs another airport as the airport even though having international flight status cannot handle large wide-body aircraft due to table top-runway and cannot be expanded further. This will help people of Udupi city and Udupi district. In February 2026,MP of Udupi-Chikmagalur Kota Srinivas Poojary along with local MLA of Kapu Assembly constituency Gurme Suresh Shetty met Ministry of Civil Aviation (India) Kinjarapu Ram Mohan Naidu and the ministry expressed readiness to support the project, subject to cooperation from the Karnataka government.

== Location ==
This airport will be 25 km from Udupi and 35 km Mangalore.Due to its proximity to NH-66 it will be easy for people from Mangalore and Udupi district (Like Udupi,Karkala, Byndoor and Kundapura town) to take flights.This is also very near to NITK.

Nearest railway station for this airport will be Padubidri railway station which is in Konkan Railway zone.
