= Harihar Airport =

- IATA: none; ICAO: VO52

Summary
- Airport type: Private
- Operator: Grasim Industries Ltd.(Harihar Polyfibers and Grasiline Division)
- Serves: Harihar
- Elevation AMSL: 533 m / 1,750 ft
- Coordinates: 14.535°N 75.787°E

Map

Runways
Direction	Length		Surface
Direction	m	ft	Surface
06/24	1,491	4,893	Asphalt

Harihar Airport (ICAO: VO52) is a small private airport serving Harihar, a city in the Karnataka state of India. The airport served as an air strip for private charter service.

== Accidents and incidents ==
- On 12 May 2005, then Chief Minister, N. Dharam Singh, the Deputy Chief Minister, Siddaramaiah, the Revenue Minister, M.P. Prakash, escape from a possible accident while landing at the Harihar polyfibres airstrip. Pilot of the private aircraft told the senior executives of Harihar Polifibres that there was a ditch in the runway and the aircraft bumped owing to uneven surface.

== See also ==
- Airports in India
- List of busiest airports in India by passenger traffic
- List of airports in Karnataka
