= Mysore Airport =

Airport in Mysuru, India

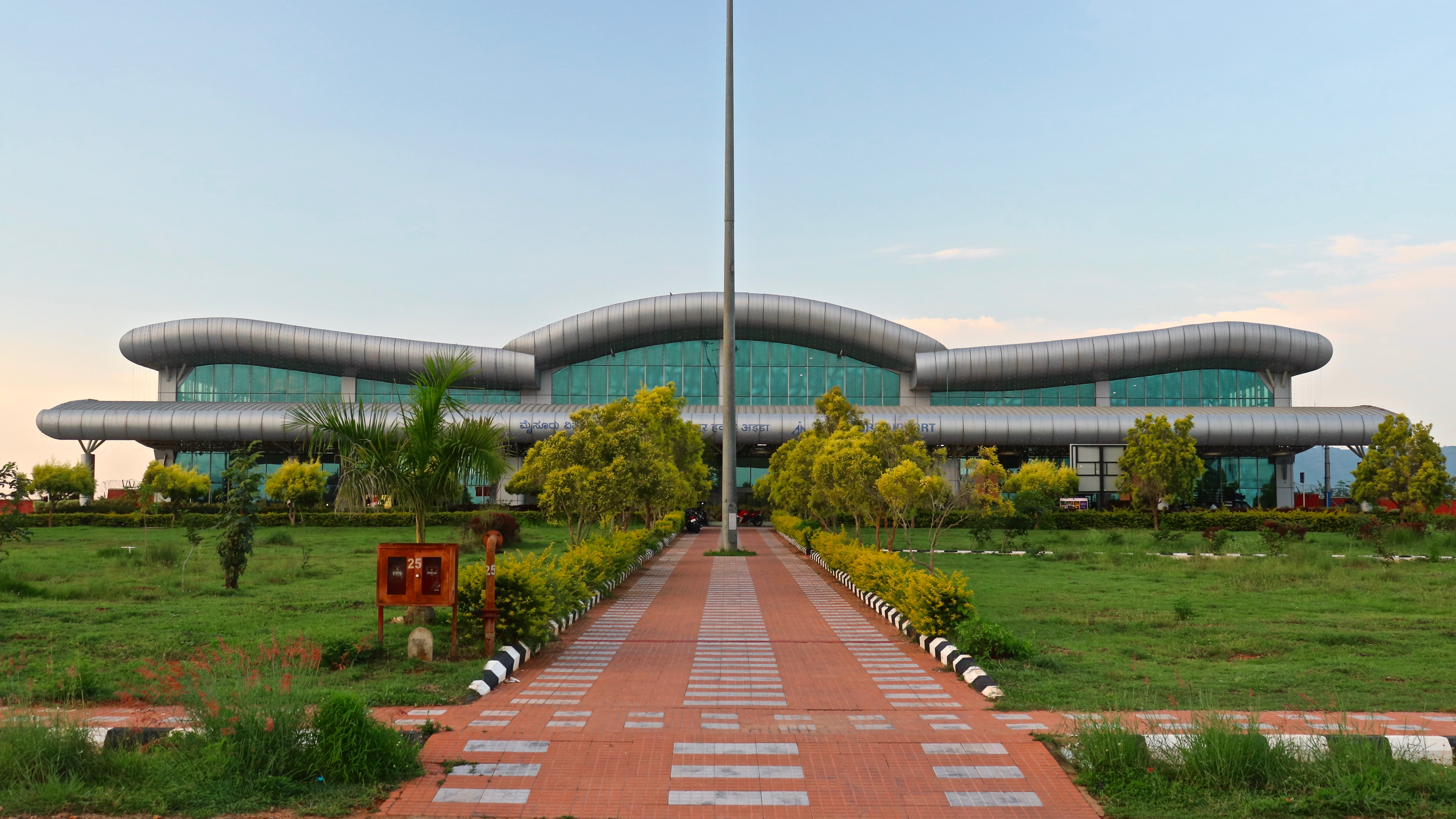
- IATA: MYQ; ICAO: VOMY

Summary
- Airport type: Public
- Owner/Operator: Airports Authority of India
- Serves: Mysore
- Location: Mandakalli, Mysuru, Karnataka, India
- Opened: 1940; 86 years ago
- Elevation AMSL: 731 m (2,398 ft)
- Coordinates: 12°13′57″N 76°39′23″E

Map
- Location of airport in Karnataka MYQ (India)

Runways
| Direction | Length | | Surface |
| Direction | m | ft | Surface |
|---|---|---|---|
| 09/27 | 1,740 | 5,709 | Concrete |

Statistics (April 2025 – March 2026)
- Passengers: 91,739 (▼ -3.3%)
- Aircraft movements: 1,621 (▼ -2.5%)
- Cargo tonnage: 0 ( 0%)
- Source: AAI

Mysore Airport (IATA: MYQ, ICAO: VOMY), also known as Mandakalli Airport, is a domestic airport serving Mysore in Karnataka, India. It is located eight kilometres (5 mi) south of the city in the village of Mandakalli and is owned and operated by the Airports Authority of India. The Princely State of Mysore constructed it in 1940. The airport was later refurbished and inaugurated in May 2010.

== History ==
The airport was built by the Princely State of Mysore in 1940. During its first several decades, Mysore Airport served various functions. Government officials such as Jawaharlal Nehru landed at the airfield, and the National Cadet Corps used it to train glider pilots. The Hindu introduced passenger flights to Bangalore in May 1965. Vayudoot also flew to Bangalore between April 1985 and September 1989. The airport had two grass runways and was capable of handling Douglas DC-3s and similar planes at the time.

In 2005, the Karnataka government and the Airports Authority of India reached an agreement to renovate the airport. A new terminal and a runway designed for aircraft like the ATR 72 were built. The project cost ₹82 crore (US$8.6 million) and was completed in September 2009. The airport was inaugurated by Chief Minister B. S. Yediyurappa in May 2010. Five months later, Kingfisher Airlines started a flight to Bangalore.

most important point is Sardar Vallabhbhai Patel started his accession of princely states into union of india from this airport with the grace os HH Sri Jayachamarajendra Wodeyar, who, on Nehru's request, offered his 2 seater plane with pilot & arrangement of fuel.

== Infrastructure ==
Mysore Airport has one runway designated 09/27. It is made of concrete and measures 1,740 by 30 metres (5,709 ft × 98 ft). The terminal building has a capacity of 200 passengers.

== Airlines and destinations ==
Between April 2023 and March 2024, the airport received 127,994 passengers and had 2,483 aircraft movements.

| Airlines | Destinations |
|---|---|
| IndiGo | Chennai, Hyderabad |

== Ground transportation ==
The airport is situated on National Highway 766. The Karnataka State Road Transport Corporation runs a bus service between City Bus Stand and the airport.

== See also ==
- List of airports in Karnataka
