= Sedam Airport =

- IATA: none; ICAO: none

Summary
- Airport type: Private
- Operator: Vasavadatta Cement (Unit of BK Birla Group)
- Location: Sedam
- Elevation AMSL: 1,397 ft / 425 m
- Coordinates: 17°10′4″N 77°18′40″E

Map

Runways
Direction	Length		Surface
Direction	m	ft	Surface
05/23	1,466	4,812	Asphalt

Sedam Airport is a private airstrip located at Sedam, Karnataka, India. It is operated by the Vasavadatta Cement unit of the BK Birla Group. The airstrip was built in 1986.
