= Hassan Airport (Karnataka) =

Airport in Karnataka, India

- IATA: none; ICAO: none

Summary
- Airport type: Public, GreenField
- Owner: State Government
- Serves: Hassan
- Location: Boovanahalli, Hassan
- Elevation AMSL: 956 m (3,136 ft)
- Coordinates: 13°00′57″N 76°10′00″E

Map
- Location within Karnataka

Hassan Airport is a greenfield airport project under construction at Boovanahalli village, 6 km from Hassan, Karnataka, India. The State government had initially found the project financially un-viable and decided to revise the project plan in 2012. The project was revived in 2021 and the airport development will be taken up the UDAN scheme at a cost of Rs 175 crore.

== History ==
The Government of Karnataka floated the airport proposal at Hassan in 1967, keeping in view of the economic and tourism potentials of the district. The Public Works Department (PWD) of Government of Karnataka acquired 134.28 acres of land in 1972 for the airport project. However, the project was shelved until the 1990s. The proposal was revived again in 1996 and the PWD and Directorate General of Civil Aviation (DGCA), surveyed the area and evaluated the sites for the airport project. The site at Boovanahalli village was selected after detailed study on the physical, environmental, meteorological and economic aspects. A notification was also made in the State Gazetteer and local dailies to invite interested bidders for the project. After technical and financial appraisals, the Hassan Airport Project was awarded to M/s Jupiter Aviation and Logistics Limited, Bangalore.

The project was to be implemented as a joint venture between the Government of Karnataka and Jupiter Aviation. The airport complex was to include a pilot training institute and an Aircraft maintenance centre. An Agreement to construct the airport on Build-operate-transfer basis was signed on 6 September 2007, effective from the day of commissioning of the airport until the completion of 30 years of lease period. The groundbreaking ceremony on 26 August 2007 was attended by former Prime Minister H.D. Deve Gowda. The project requires 960 acres of land. The district administration acquired and handed over 536 acres of the total 960 acres required for the project. The remaining 424 acres was not acquired and the project failed to take off.

In May 2015, the Government of India granted the approval for setting up15 Greenfield airports in the country including Hassan. The Civil Aviation Ministry directed the state government to acquire 200 acres for the airport in 2018. The project will be developed under the centre's Regional Connectivity Scheme at a cost of Rs 175 crore and the costs will be shared by the State and Central Governments.

== See also ==
- List of airports in Karnataka
