= Raichur Airport =

Airport in Raichur, Karnataka, India

- IATA: none; ICAO: VORR

Summary
- Airport type: Public
- Owner: Airport Authority of India
- Operator: Government of Karnataka
- Serves: Raichur
- Location: Yeramaras, Raichur
- Opened: 1942; 84 years ago
- Elevation AMSL: 1,230 ft (370 m)
- Coordinates: 16°16′47″N 77°21′37″E

Map
- Location within Karnataka

Runways
| Direction | Length | | Surface |
| Direction | m | ft | Surface |
|---|---|---|---|
| | 1,035 | 3,395 |

Raichur Airport (ICAO: VORR) is an abandoned airstrip at Yeramus, located around 10 km away from Raichur city in the Karnataka state of India. The airstrip was constructed in 1942 during World War II and was abandoned after the war. The Karnataka Industrial Infrastructure Development Corporation (KSIIDC) plans to develop this site into a low-frills airport at a cost of Rs. 185 crore.

== Historic landing ==
On 26 February 1957, when the Prime Minister of India Sri Jawaharlal Nehru was travelling on board a WIP IL-14, one of its engines caught fire. Its pilot, Sqn Ldr RA Rufus carried out an emergency landing at Raichur (a disused and unpaved surface). He was awarded Ashok Chakra for his presence of mind and dedication to the service.

== Future developments ==
Proposals to upgrade the airstrip at Raichur were made at the Karnataka State Legislative Assembly in 2008. In May 2021, the Airports Authority of India gave its technical approval for constructing a 1,800 metre long runway suitable for operations of ATR-72 sized aircraft, as requested by Karnataka State Industrial Infrastructure Development Corporation (KSIIDC). A total of 402 acres of land will be reserved for the development of the airport. The state Government approved the detailed project report (DPR) for the airport prepared by RITES in March 2022. The airport is to be built at a cost of Rs. 185 crore. The project received environmental clearance from the Union Ministry of Environment and Forests in April 2025.
