= Mangalore International Airport =

Airport serving Mangaluru, Karnataka, India

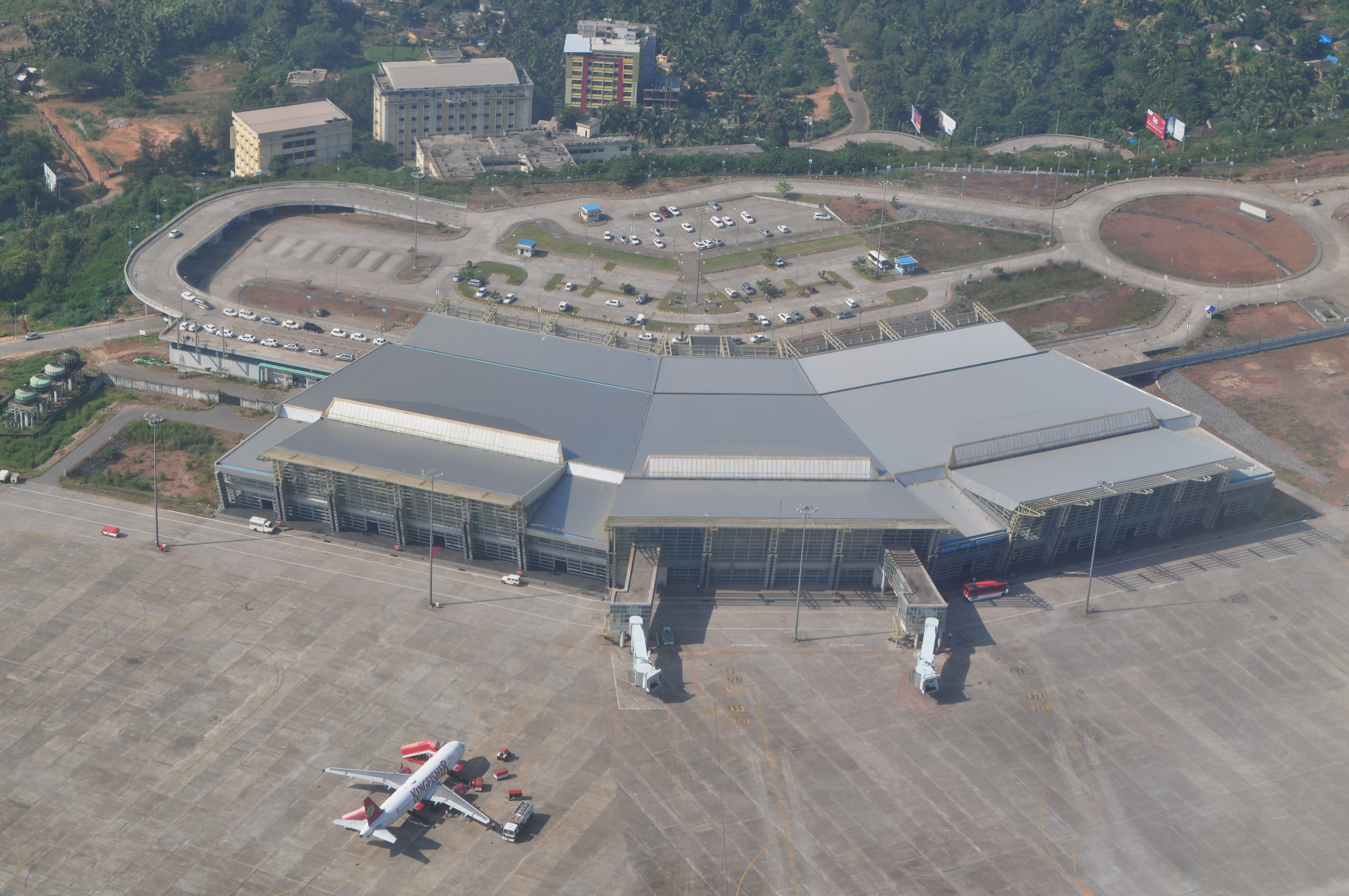
- IATA: IXE; ICAO: VOML

Summary
- Airport type: Public
- Owner: Airports Authority of India
- Operator: Mangaluru International Airport Limited
- Serves: Mangaluru
- Location: Bajpe, Mangaluru, Karnataka, India
- Opened: 25 December 1951; 74 years ago
- Operating base for: Air India Express; IndiGo
- Elevation AMSL: 318 ft (97 m)
- Coordinates: 12°57′41″N 074°53′24″E
- Website: www.adani.com/mangaluru-airport

Map
- Location of airport in Karnataka IXE (India)

Runways
Direction	Length		Surface
Direction	m	ft	Surface
06/24	2,330	7,644	Asphalt

Statistics (April 2025 - March 2026)
- Passengers: 2,548,088 (▲8.8%)
- Aircraft movements: 17,923 (▲6.9%)
- Cargo tonnage: 2,413 (▲9.1%)
- Source: AAI

Mangalore International Airport (IATA: IXE, ICAO: VOML) (also known as Mangaluru International Airport) is an international airport serving the coastal city of Mangaluru in the state of Karnataka, India. It is one of only two international airports in the state, the other being Kempegowda International Airport in the capital city of Bengaluru. Mangalore International Airport is the second-busiest airport in the state. In addition to domestic destinations, flights depart daily for major cities in the Middle East. The airport was named Bajpe Aerodrome, when it opened on 25 December 1951 by the former and First Prime Minister Jawaharlal Nehru, who arrived on a Douglas DC-3 aircraft.

== Overview ==
The airport is near Bajpe, around 13 km (8.1 mi) northeast of Mangaluru city centre. It is on top of a hill, with one tabletop runway (06/24). Only two other airports in India have tabletop runways – Kozhikode and Lengpui. The very small and basic terminal was renovated in the early 2000s, adding parking controls, additional seating and additional cafés. The airport was initially used for limited domestic flights, mainly to Mumbai and Bengaluru.

The operation of international flights started in 2006 with Air India Express flying to Dubai. Mangalore Airport was a customs airport for six years, from 3 October 2006 to 3 October 2012, before it was granted the status of international airport.

Until 2005, the small 1,600 m (5,249 ft) runway meant the airport could only handle Boeing 737-400 size aircraft. The longer runway now handles slightly larger aircraft. On 10 January 2006, an Airbus A319 of Kingfisher Airlines landed on the new runway. On 28 September 2012, an Airbus A310 landed for the first time at Mangaluru. It was a charter flight for the Hajj pilgrims to Mecca, Saudi Arabia.

From 2011 to 2012, the airport had a revenue of ₹426.4 million (equivalent to ₹880 million or US$9.4 million in 2026) and an operating profit of ₹87.6 million (equivalent to ₹180 million or US$1.9 million in 2026), up from ₹8.3 million (equivalent to ₹27 million or US$290,000 in 2026) in 2006–07. In 2012–13 the airport handled a landmark 1.02 million passengers with 11,940 aircraft movements. The revenue for the same period was Rs 506.6 million, and it recorded an operating profit of Rs 164.9 million during 2012–13. In 2013–14 it handled a 1.25 million passengers with revenues of Rs 638.9 million.

In July 2019, the central government approved leasing of the airport through public-private partnership (PPP) to the Adani Enterprises, for operations, management and development for the next 50 years. This airport is accredited by the Airports Council International (ACI) under the Airport Health Accreditation (AHA) programme.

== Facilities ==
=== Runway ===
The original runway (09/27), 1,615 m (5,299 ft) long, was opened in 1951. It was a tabletop runway, with landing approaches presented with the extreme edges of a hillside. The edges of the hill drop into a valley from a height of about 90 m (300 ft) to 9 m (30 ft)) within a short distance of just 500 m (1,600 ft) on the east of the runway and from about 83 m (272 ft) to 25 m (82 ft) on the western side. The runway was not level, with the height varying from 90 m (300 ft) to 83 m (272 ft) from east to west. Landing on this short runway was considered difficult.

Mangalore Airport was the first airport in Karnataka to have two runways and the first to have a runway made of concrete. The second runway (06/24), 2,330 m (7,644 ft) long, was opened on 10 May 2006, but since 2014 it is the only runway in operation. A Jet Airways flight from Bangalore with 95 passengers on board was the first to land on this runway. The airport has acquired land to build a taxiway parallel to the new runway to reduce aircraft turnaround time.

Union Minister of State for Civil Aviation Praful Patel announced on 15 May 2010 that a work order for extending the runway to 2,740 metres (9,000 ft) would be issued soon. After the crash of Air India Express Flight 812, the minister reaffirmed on 30 May 2010 that the runway extension will take place and will take into account the spillover area required during an emergency.

Safety improvements were implemented after the Directorate General of Civil Aviation (India) (DGCA) identified this as one of the 11 airports in India as unsafe. Addition of a runway end safety area, ensuring proper markings on the runway, and proper maintenance of the basic strip were among the improvements.

=== Passenger terminal ===
The road to the new terminal reduces the distance between the city and the airport by about 8 km (5.0 mi). The airport had a trial run of the terminal for domestic flights on 16 December 2009. On 15 May 2010, the terminal building was inaugurated by Civil Aviation Minister, Praful Patel, along with former Chief Minister of Karnataka, B. S. Yediyurappa. It was to be opened to air traffic on 1 July 2010, but it became operational on 2 August 2010 due to delays caused by the Air India Express Flight 812 accident.

As of 15 May 2010, 26 domestic flights and 52 international flights were operated every week.

=== Air traffic control ===
The construction of a new air traffic control (ATC) tower was completed in June 2014, and commissioned for one-month trial on 19 January 2015.

On 5 September 2013 the Airports Authority of India commissioned a DGCA approved advanced automated air traffic management system, replacing the older system. The system enhances flight safety by providing flight plans, direction finders, and air-ground-data link messages. This system processes radar feeds from Bangalore, Chennai, and Thiruvananthapuram and displays them at Mangaluru.

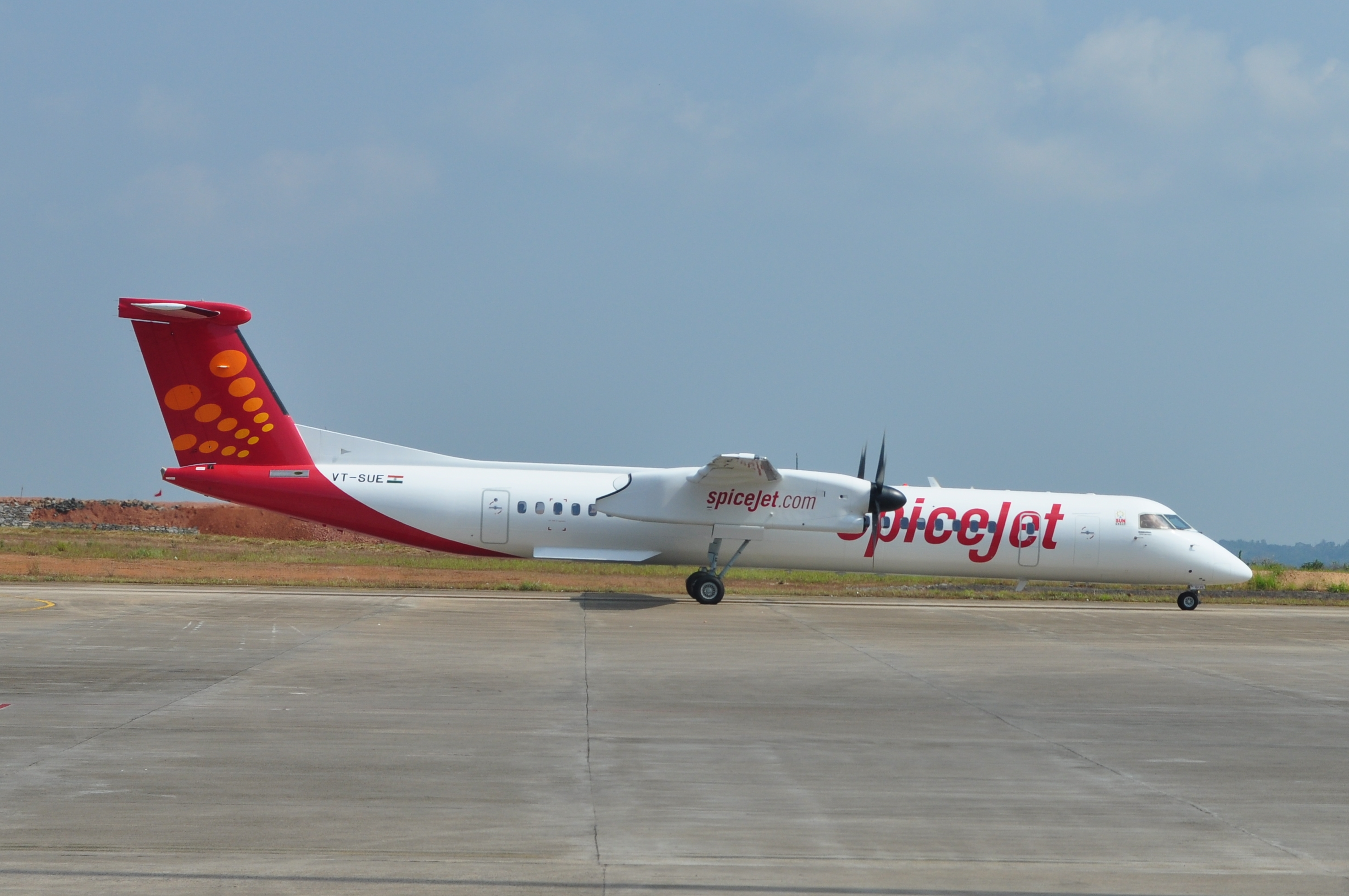
Spicejet DHC Dash 8-Q400 VT-SUE at Mangalore Airport

=== Old terminal ===
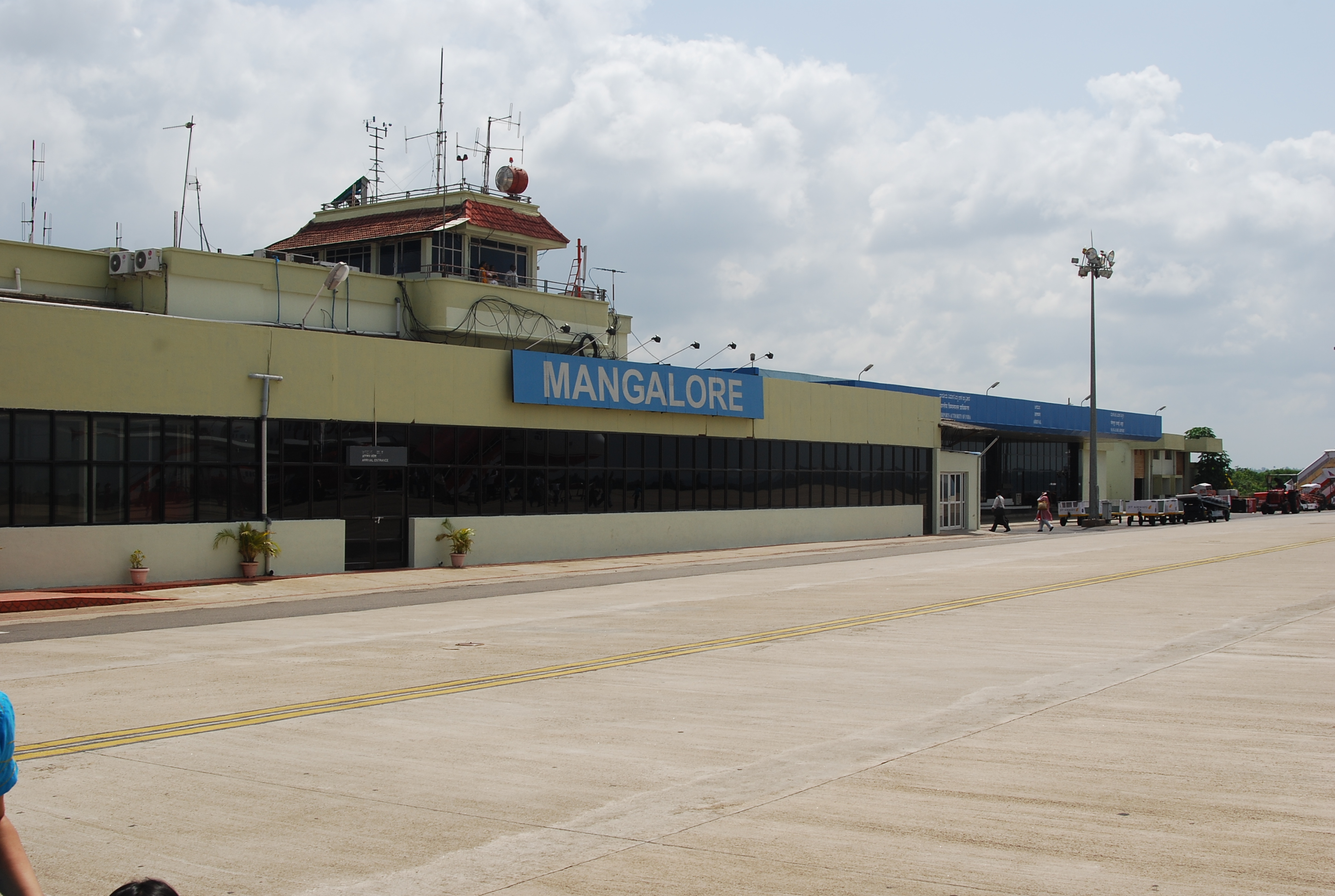
The Cargo Terminal

Since 2011 the old terminal has been used for direct flights to Medina, Saudi Arabia, for pilgrims undertaking the Hajj. In 2011 and 2012 chartered flights landed at Mangalore International Airport and carried passengers from the old terminal building.

=== Indian Coast Guard Air Station ===
The Mangalore Airport Director announced on 28 January 2016 that the Airports Authority of India have handed over 1,600 square metres (17,000 sq ft) of space at the old terminal building to the Indian Coast Guard to set up an air station for its air operations. The ICG proposed the stationing of two of its Dornier 228 aircraft at the air station.

=== Expansion ===
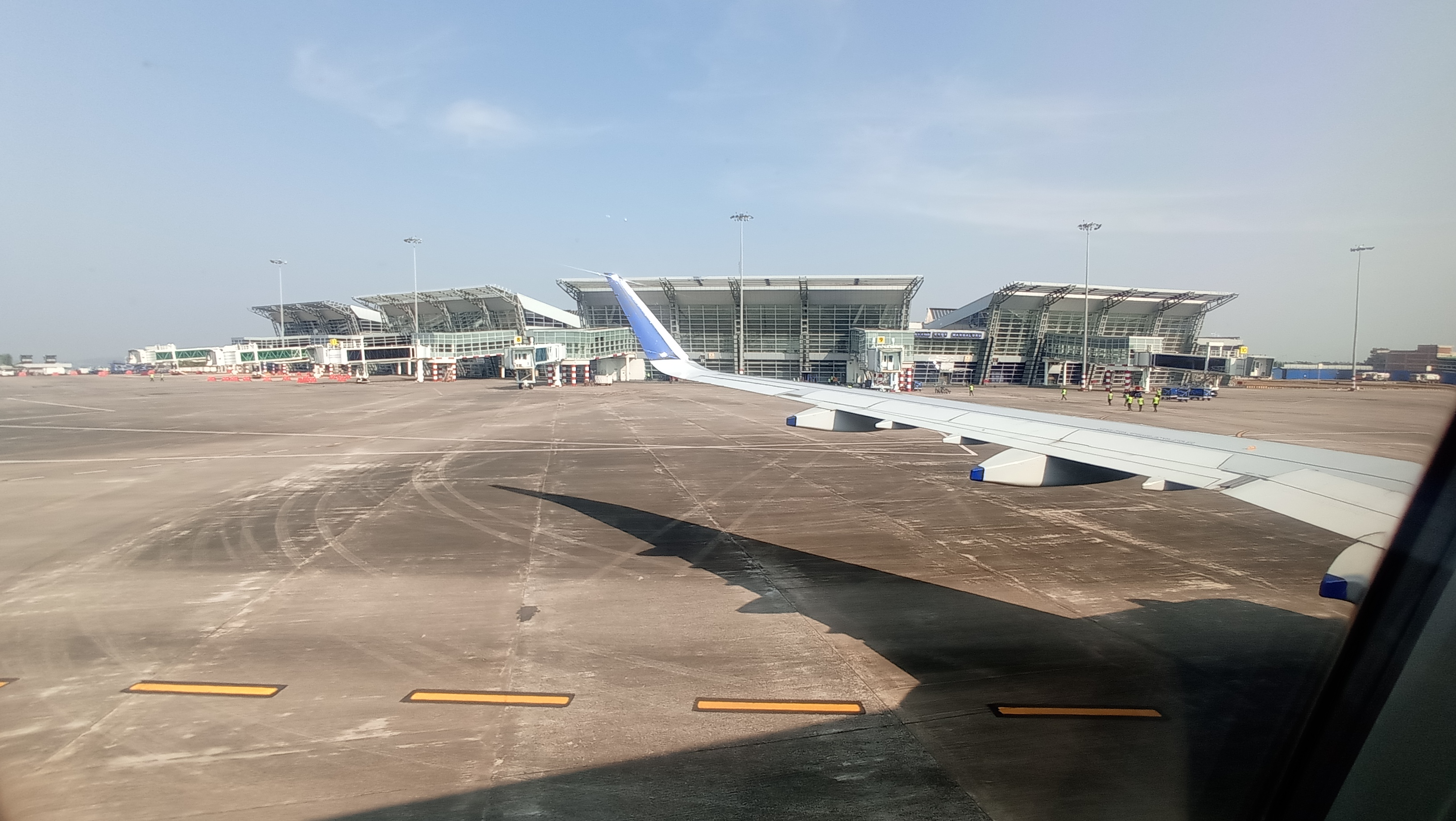
Mangalore Airport Terminal Building with all 6 aerobridges installed

- Currently the apron is connected to the edge of runway 06, and aircraft movements on the apron have to be stopped when a plane lands and can only resume when it reaches the apron. A new 2,400-metre taxiway will be built parallel to the runway and join the runway ahead of the landing threshold, enabling aircraft on the apron to move towards the runway and hold, saving 10 to 15 minutes. The construction work on the parallel taxiway started on 1 November 2014 and though slated for completion in September 2016, only Phase I was completed by March 2017.
- The 812 crash inquiry recommendation for runway lengthening not having been implemented due to funding obstacles, its length remains 2,450 m (8,040 ft).
- Passenger volume projections for the year 2025 made by the AAI while constructing the new passenger terminal were already exceeded in 2012.
- Commencement of wide-body aircraft flights from the airport, under a public-private partnership model, depending on allotment of 1 km^{2} (247.1 acres) of land from the government.

== Airlines and destinations ==
Airlines	Destinations
Air India Express	Bengaluru, Delhi, Hyderabad, Jeddah, Kuwait City, Muscat, Ras Al Khaimah, Thiruvananthapuram
IndiGo	Abu Dhabi, Bengaluru, Chennai, Delhi, Mumbai–Navi

== Statistics ==
Presently, it ranks 12 in the list of airports with international passenger traffic after Delhi, Mumbai, Chennai, Kochi, Bengaluru, Hyderabad, Kolkata, Thiruvananthapuram, Ahmedabad, Kozhikode, Tiruchirappalli international airports. The airport had 8.91 lakh passengers in the FY 2011-12 and witnessed a growth rate of 5.44%. According to the airport sources, it has a target of achieving 16 lac passengers traffic in the FY 2016–17.

Mangalore International Airport passenger traffic statistics
Year	Rank	Passengers	Growth	Rank change
2022–23	29	1,809,266	▲78.5%	▲2
2021–22	31	1,013,453		
2020–21				
2019–20				
2018–19	27	2,240,664		
2017–18				
2016–17	25	1,734,810	▲3.6%	▼4
2015–16	21	1,674,251	▲28.1%	Steady
2014–15	21	1,307,083		

Passenger traffic at Mangalore International Airport (2025–2026)
Month	2025	2026	Change (%)
January	215,915	245,593	+13.7%
February	190,764	209,054	+9.6%
March	201,178	163,663	−18.6%
April	219,265	177,013	−19.3%
May	224,117	216,814	−3.3%
June	189,908	177,529	−6.5%
July	196,692	189,067	−3.9%
August	215,245	189,061	−12.2%
January–August total	1,653,084	1,567,794	−5.2%
April–August total	1,045,227	949,484	−9.2%

== Air cargo complex ==
Air cargo complex of the airport was commissioned in the year 2013.

Tonnage and Annual Handling Capacity
Cargo type	Total covered area	Capacity (One time handling capacity)
International	1,400 m^{2} (15,000 sq ft)	140 t (140 long tons; 150 short tons)
Domestic	1,094 m^{2} (11,780 sq ft)	110 t (110 long tons; 120 short tons)

Major commodities are fresh vegetables, chilled fish, ornamental fish, cashews, flowers and machinery parts.

== Ground transport ==
Taxis ply between the airport and the city of Mangaluru. Prepaid taxi service is available around the clock at the airport counter in the arrival hall. The nearest railway station is Jokatte railway station.

== Accidents and incidents ==
- On 19 August 1981, Indian Airlines Flight 557, a HAL 748 VT-DXF overshot the 1,763 metres (5,783 ft) old runway 27 at Mangalore-Bajpe Airport in wet weather. The aircraft came to a halt just beyond the runway edge. While there were no fatalities, the aircraft was damaged beyond repair and was written off. One of the passengers was Veerappa Moily, then Finance Minister of Karnataka. An investigation revealed numerous pilot-attributed errors: the aircraft's flaps had not been set to landing position, the aircraft had landed long on the downsloping runway, at excessive speed and with a tailwind. The aircraft involved was HAL 748 VT-DXF, with manufacturer's serial number 511; it first flew in 1967.
- On 22 May 2010, Air India Express Flight 812, a Boeing 737-800 VT-AXV, flying on the Dubai-Mangalore route, overshot the 2,448 metres (8,033 ft) runway number 06/24, killing 158 people, including 6 crew members; only 8 survived. The aircraft overshot the runway and plunged into a steep gorge at the end of the runway. The starboard wing impacted the concrete socket of the instrument landing system (ILS) localiser antenna, rendering it unusable. This resulted in delayed or cancelled flights for two weeks during the monsoon rains, which reduced visibility. It took the airport a little under a month to repair and calibrate the ILS and bring it back online.

== See also ==
- List of airports in Karnataka
- Udupi International Airport
