= New Bellary Airport =

Airport of Karnataka, India

- IATA: none; ICAO: none

Summary
- Airport type: Public
- Serves: Bellary
- Location: Near Chaganur and Sirivaram villages, Karnataka, India

New Bellary Airport is a proposed greenfield airport, which will serve the city of Bellary in Karnataka, India. It will be built by the Karnataka State Industrial and Infrastructure Development Corporation Ltd (KSIIDC). With the Public-Private Partnership project for developing the airport failing to take off, the State department has decided to take up the project on its own on engineering, procurement and construction (EPC) basis. The new airport site is located roughly 12 kilometres (7.5 mi) northeast of Bellary, near the villages of Chaganur and Sirivaram.

== History ==
In September 2008, the Government of Karnataka approved a proposal to build a new airport for Bellary under the public–private partnership model. The airport would be built on 1,000 acres (400 ha) near the villages of Chaganur and Sirivaram, 12 kilometres (7.5 mi) northeast of the city. The State Government began inviting bids for assistance from the private sector in December 2008. In that same month, Airports Authority of India officials who had arrived to survey the land designated for the project were turned away by protesting farmers, who objected to the location of the airport on their fertile lands. Violent protests erupted in February 2009.

In July 2009, however, some farmers said they were willing to give their land to the State as long as proper compensation was received. One year later, the State Government had acquired roughly 900 acres (360 ha) of land for the project. Construction company MARG won the contract to build the airport, and the foundation stone was laid on 20 August 2010. MARG said it would invest ₹230 crore (US$24 million), of which ₹110 crore (US$11 million) would be spent on the initial phase. This phase would encompass the construction of a terminal building with a capacity for 100 passengers and an apron with 6–8 parking stands. The airport would be able to handle ATR aircraft.

In January 2012, the Karnataka High Court rejected the State Government's notifications to obtain 250 acres (100 ha) of land for the airport. Over 70 farmers had petitioned to the Court, claiming it was excessive to construct a third airport for Bellary; Bellary Airport and Jindal Vijaynagar Airport in Toranagallu, 30 kilometres (19 mi) west of Bellary, already existed. The petitioners noted that Air Deccan had suffered low occupancy on its flights to Toranagallu and that Bellary was equidistant from two airports, the ones in Bangalore and Hyderabad. The loss of land made it impossible to lay the runway for the new airport. By June 2013, MARG had walked out on the project. Farmers who had given away their land decided to continue cultivating it as progress on the airport had halted.

The Infrastructure Development Department of the State Government revived the project in mid-2014, upon learning that MARG had expressed renewed interest in it and was willing to survey the land. The survey began in September 2014. In August 2015, the Department said that land acquisition issues had been resolved and that work on the greenfield airport would begin following the completion of Gulbarga Airport. The State then began the process of handing over 892 acres (361 ha) of land to MARG.

Around 900 acres have been earmarked for the project with the State reserving Rs 150 crore for the initial funding. The survey work began on 20 March. The airport runway will be equipped to handle the ATR-72 fleet but will gradually be extended to allow the Airbus 320 The survey work has been started and as per the MARG banner at the site, the airport is named as 'Sri Krishnadevaraya Airport'. It is named after Krishnadevaraya, who was the king of the Vijayanagara Empire.

In December 2022, the State Government cancelled its contract with MARG.
