= Hampe =

Hampe may refer to:

== Surnames ==
- Ariulf Eric Hampe (1922–2009), German rocket scientist
- Asta Hampe (1907 – 2003), German engineer, physicist, and statistician
- Erich Hampe (1889–1978), German soldier, editor, and author
- Georg Ernst Ludwig Hampe (1795–1880), German pharmacist and botanist
- Helmut Hampe (1896 – 1939), German aviculturist
- Herbert Hampe (1913–1999), German Luftwaffe pilot
- Karl Hampe (1869–1936), German historian of the Middle Ages
- Michael Hampe (1935–2022), German theatre and opera director, general manager and actor
- Roland Hampe (1908-1981), German classical archaeologist
- Lloyd Hampe (1948-2021), Doctor of Veterinarian Medicine

== Other names ==
- Hampe Faustman (1919–1961), Swedish actor and film director

== Places ==
- Hampi or Hampe, a UNESCO World Heritage Site in northern Karnataka state, India
