= Devasamudra =

- village
- Location in Karnataka, India Devasamudra (India)
- Coordinates: 15.28°N 76.37°E
- Country: India
- State: Karnataka
- District: Bellary
- Talukas: Hospet

Government
  - Body: Gram panchayat

Population (2001)
  - Total: 6,189

Languages
  - Official: Kannada
- Time zone: UTC+5:30 (IST)
- ISO 3166 code: IN-KA
- Vehicle registration: KA
- Website: karnataka.gov.in

Devasamudra is a village in the southern state of Karnataka, India. It is located in the Hospet taluk of Bellary district in Karnataka.

== Demographics ==
As of 2011 India census, Devasamudra had a population of 6189 with 3074 males and 3115 females.

== See also ==
- Bellary
- Districts of Karnataka

454
