= Papinayakanahalli railway station =

Railway station in Karnataka

Papinayakanahalli

General information
- Location: Papinayakanahalli, Hospet Taluk, Vijayanagara district, Karnatak; India
- Coordinates: 15°14′10″N 76°29′27″E
- Elevation: 565 metres (1,854 ft)
- System: Indian Railways station
- Owner: Indian Railways
- Operator: South Western Railway zone
- Line: Guntakal–Vasco da Gama line
- Platforms: 2
- Tracks: Double Electric-Line

Construction
- Structure type: Standard (on ground)

Other information
- Status: Functioning
- Station code: PKL
- Zone(s): South Western Railway zone
- Division(s): Hubballi

Services
Preceding station	Indian Railways	Following station
Bayaluvaddigeri towards ?	South Western Railway zone Guntakal–Vasco da Gama section	Kariganuru towards ?
Location
- Interactive map

Papinayakanahalli railway station is a railway station located on the Guntakal–Vasco da Gama line operated by the South Western Railway zone under Hubballi railway division. It is situated at Papinayakanahalli, Hospet Taluk in Vijayanagara district in the Indian state of Karnatak.
