= Hunasamaranahalli =

- town
- Location in Karnataka, India
- Coordinates: 13.143°N 77.619°E
- Country: India
- State: Karnataka
- District: Bengaluru Urban

Population (2001)
  - Total: 7,384

Languages
  - Official: Kannada
- Time zone: UTC+5:30 (IST)
- Postal code: 562157

Hunasamaranahalli is a census town in Bengaluru Urban district in the Indian state of Karnataka.

== Demographics ==
As of 2001 India census, Hunasamaranahalli had a population of 7,384. Males constitute 56% of the population and females 44%. Hunasamaranahalli has an average literacy rate of 75%, higher than the national average of 59.5%: male literacy is 79%, and female literacy is 69%. In Hunasamaranahalli, 13% of the population is under 6 years of age.

== Economy ==
The head office of Star Air is on the property of the Sindhu Logistic Park in Hunasamaranahalli.
