= Kariganuru railway station =

Railway station in Karnataka

Kariganuru

General information
- Location: Kariganuru, Hospet Taluk, Vijayanagara district, Karnatak; India
- Coordinates: 15°15′06″N 76°26′00″E
- Elevation: 515 metres (1,690 ft)
- System: Indian Railways station
- Owner: Indian Railways
- Operator: South Western Railway zone
- Line: Guntakal–Vasco da Gama line
- Platforms: 1
- Tracks: Double Electric-Line

Construction
- Structure type: Standard (on ground)

Other information
- Status: Functioning
- Station code: KGW
- Zone(s): South Western Railway zone
- Division(s): Hubballi

Services
Preceding station	Indian Railways	Following station
Papinayakanahalli towards ?	South Western Railway zone Guntakal–Vasco da Gama section	Hosapete Junction towards ?
Location
- Interactive map

Kariganuru railway station is a railway station located on the Guntakal–Vasco da Gama line operated by the South Western Railway zone under Hubballi railway division. It is situated at Kariganuru, Hospet Taluk in Vijayanagara district in the Indian state of Karnatak.
