= Star Air (India) =

Indian commuter airline

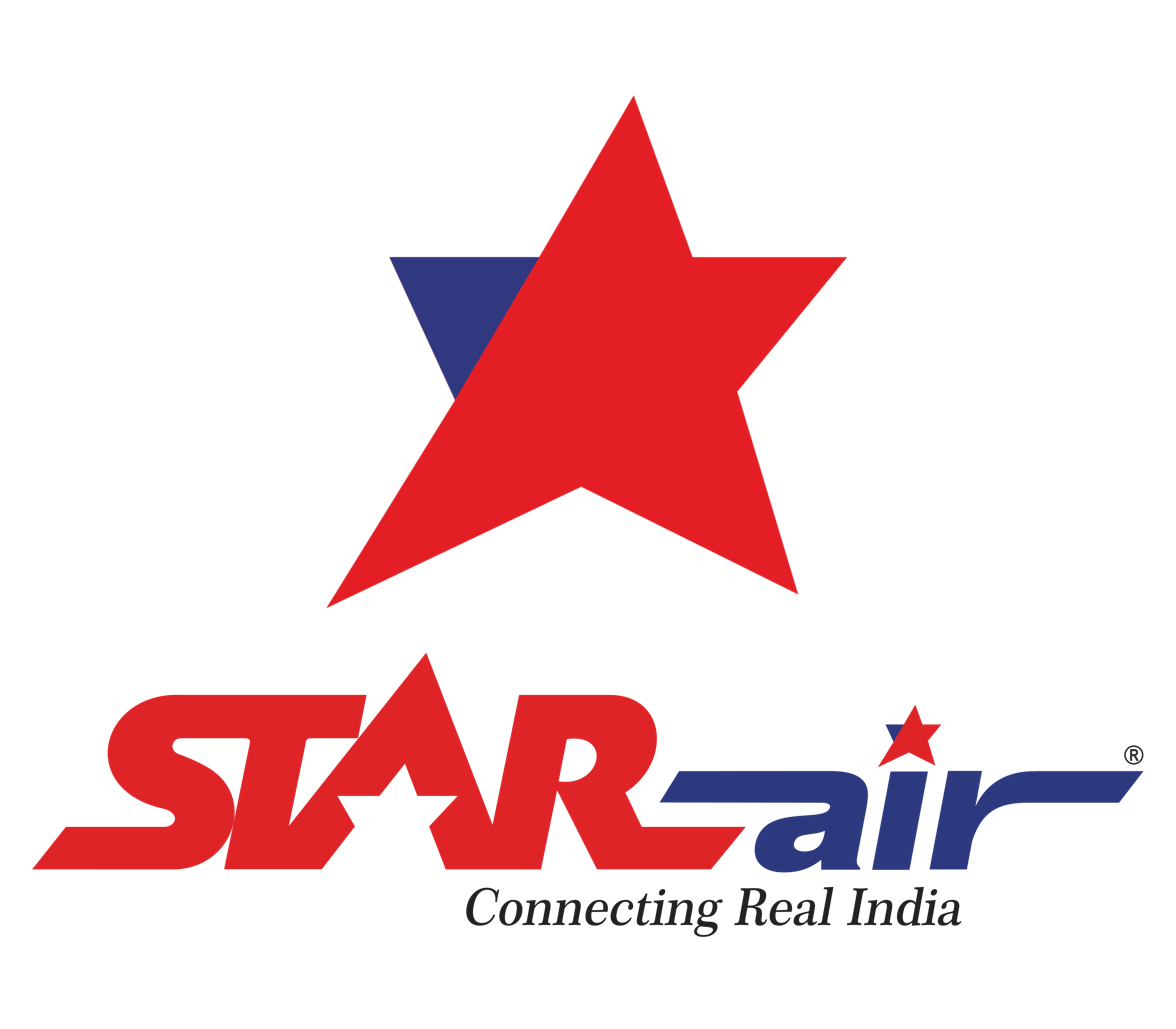

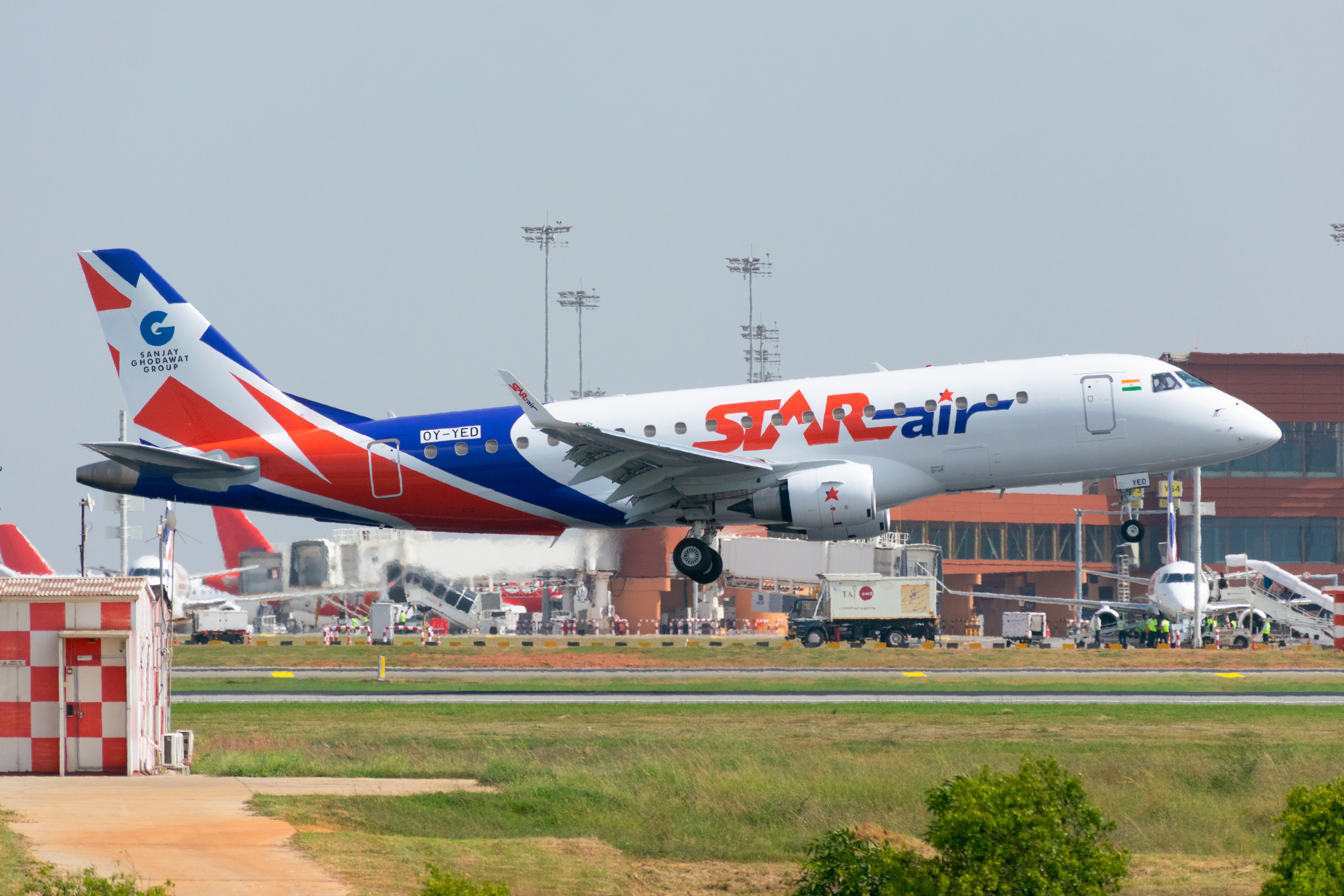
IATA	ICAO	Call sign
S5	SDG	HISTAR
- Founded: March 2017; 9 years ago
- Commenced operations: January 2019; 7 years ago
- Hubs: Kempegowda International Airport (Bengaluru); Rajiv Gandhi International Airport (Hyderabad)
- Fleet size: 10
- Destinations: 32
- Parent company: Sanjay Ghodawat Group
- Key people: Sanjay Ghodawat (Chairman); Shrenik Ghodawat (Director); Simran Singh Tiwana (CEO)
- Employees: 1500+
- Website: www.starair.in

Star Air, is an Indian regional airline, headquartered in Bengaluru. It is owned by the Sanjay Ghodawat Group. It started operations in January 2019, with its main base at Kempegowda International Airport in Bengaluru. It initially operated flights within Karnataka, and later expanded to other states as part of India's UDAN scheme. The airline operates an all-Embraer fleet of ERJ 145LRs and E175s.

== History ==
In March 2017, the Sanjay Ghodawat Group sought permission from the Government of India to operate a regional airline. Named as Star Air, the airline acquired its first aircraft, an Embraer ERJ 145LR, in June 2018. It obtained its Air Operator's Certificate in early January 2019 and announced that it would operate flights under the central government's UDAN scheme, with its main hub at the Kempegowda International Airport in Bengaluru. On 25 January 2019, the airline's operated its first flight from Bengaluru to Hubli. The airline inducted its first Embraer E175ER aircraft in May 2023, and started offering select seats in business class. The airline inducted its tenth aircraft, an E175, in April 2025. On 1 September 2025, Star Air signed a memorandum of understanding with Hindustan Aeronautics Limited to set up a dedicated maintenance, repair and overhaul unit for its Embraer aircraft at Nashik.

== Corporate affairs ==
Star Air is headquartered at the KIADB Hi-Tech Defence and Aerospace Park in Bengaluru.

== Destinations ==
As of November 2026, Star Air flies to 31 domestic destinations within India with its hubs at Kempegowda International Airport and Rajiv Gandhi International Airport.

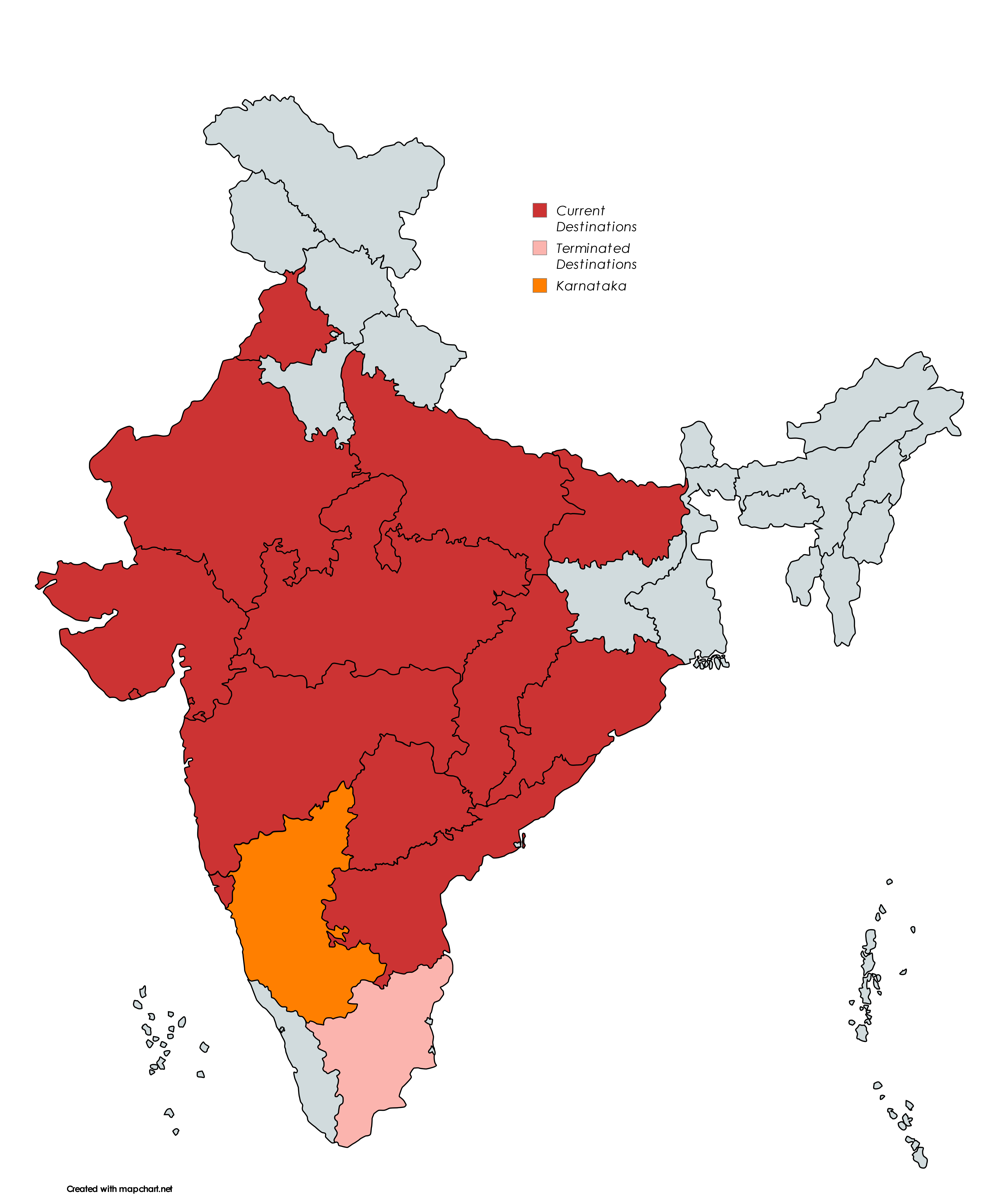
Indian states served by Star Air

Star Air destinations
State	City	Airport	Notes	Ref.
Andhra Pradesh	Tirupati	Tirupati Airport		
Bihar	Purnia	Purnea Airport		
Chhattisgarh	Raipur	Swami Vivekananda Airport	Terminated	
Dadra and Nagar Haveli and Daman and Diu	Diu	Diu Airport		
Goa	Mopa	Manohar International Airport		
Gujarat	Ahmedabad	Sardar Vallabhbhai Patel International Airport		
Gujarat	Bhuj	Bhuj Airport		
Gujarat	Jamnagar	Jamnagar Airport		
Gujarat	Mundra	Mundra Airport		
Gujarat	Surat	Surat Airport		
Karnataka	Ballari	Bellary Airport	Terminated	
Karnataka	Bengaluru	Kempegowda International Airport	Hub	
Karnataka	Belgaum	Belgaum Airport		
Karnataka	Bidar	Bidar Airport		
Karnataka	Hubli	Hubli Airport	Terminated	
Karnataka	Kalaburagi	Kalaburagi Airport		
Karnataka	Mysore	Mysore Airport	Terminated	
Karnataka	Shimoga	Shivamogga Airport	Ends 21 November 2026	
Karnataka	Vidyanagar	Jindal Vijayanagar Airport		
Madhya Pradesh	Indore	Devi Ahilya Bai Holkar Airport		
Maharashtra	Gondia	Gondia Airport		
Maharashtra	Kolhapur	Chhatrapati Rajaram Maharaj Airport		
Maharashtra	Mumbai	Chhatrapati Shivaji Maharaj International Airport		
Maharashtra	Mumbai	Navi Mumbai International Airport	Terminated	
Maharashtra	Nagpur	Dr. Babasaheb Ambedkar International Airport		
Maharashtra	Nanded	Shri Guru Gobind Singh Ji Airport		
Maharashtra	Pune	Pune Airport		
Maharashtra	Solapur	Solapur Airport		
Odisha	Bhubaneswar	Biju Patnaik Airport		
Odisha	Jharsuguda	Veer Surendra Sai Airport		
Punjab	Jalandhar	Adampur Airport		
Rajasthan	Jaipur	Jaipur International Airport		
Rajasthan	Jodhpur	Jodhpur Airport	Terminated	
Rajasthan	Kishangarh	Kishangarh Airport		
Tamil Nadu	Madurai	Madurai Airport	Terminated	
Telangana	Hyderabad	Rajiv Gandhi International Airport	Hub	
Uttar Pradesh	Ghaziabad	Hindon Airport		
Uttar Pradesh	Lucknow	Chaudhary Charan Singh International Airport		
West Bengal	Kolkata	Netaji Subhas Chandra Bose International Airport		

== Fleet ==
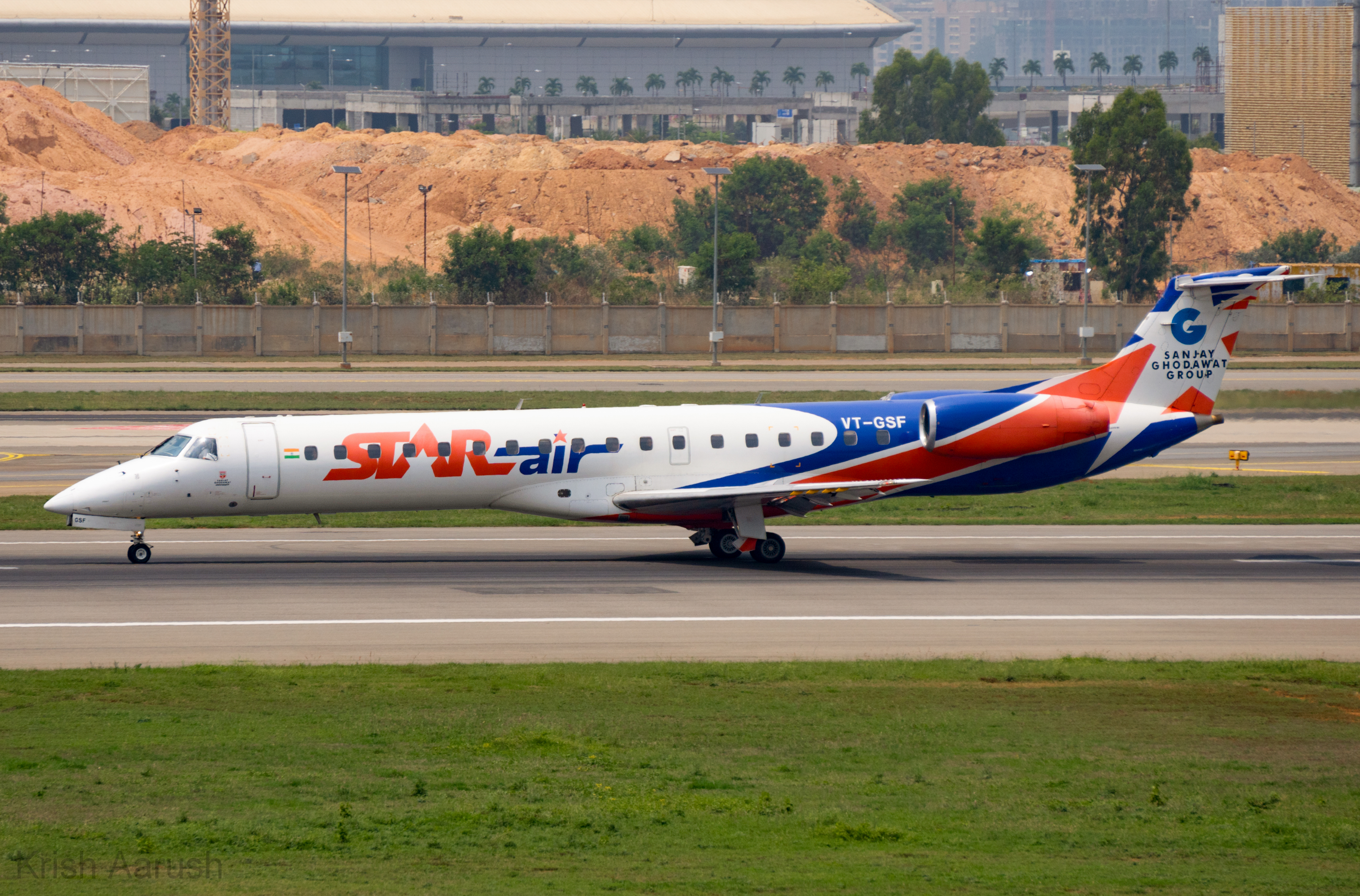
Star Air Embraer ERJ 145

=== Current fleet ===
As of July 2026, Star Air operates the following aircraft:

Star Air fleet
Aircraft	In service	Orders	Passengers			Notes
Aircraft	In service	Orders	C	Y	Total	Notes
Embraer ERJ 145LR	2	—	—	50	50	
Embraer E175LR	8	2	12	64	76	
Total	10	2				

=== Former fleet ===
As of December 2025, Star Air operated 3 Embraer ERJ 145 and 8 Embraer 175.
