= Bellary Airport =

Airport in Bellary, Karnataka, India

- IATA: BEP; ICAO: VOBI

Summary
- Airport type: Public
- Operator: Airports Authority of India
- Serves: Bellary
- Location: Bellary, Karnataka, India
- Elevation AMSL: 1,542 ft (470 m)
- Coordinates: 15°09′46″N 76°52′54″E

Map
- Location within Karnataka Location within India

Runways
Direction	Length		Surface
Direction	ft	m	Surface
12/30	3,630	1,106	Asphalt
- Source: DAFIF

Bellary Airport (IATA: BEP, ICAO: VOBI) is an airport serving Bellary, a city in the Indian state of Karnataka. It was once served by Tata Airlines and Vayudoot. Bellary was a part of the first commercial flight of India which was from Karachi to Madras, flown by J.R.D Tata on 15 October 1932. This is the first airport of Karnataka built as early as 1932. However, as of May 2018, the airport is without commercial air service. Jindal Vijaynagar Airport, located about 36 kilometres (22 mi) west of the city, is used instead for this purpose. A new airport for Bellary is being planned as well.

== History ==
Bellary Airport existed as early as 1932, when it figured in an airmail service operated by Tata Airlines (now Air India). The service operated Karachi–Ahmedabad–Mumbai–Bellary–Madras. The British selected Bellary because of its strategic location and the presence of many troops in the city. Afterward, regional carrier Vayudoot operated flights to Bellary.

In 2004, the Government of Karnataka decided to permit commercial flights from an airstrip owned by Jindal Vijaynagar Steel Ltd (JVSL) in Toranagallu, 30 kilometres (19 mi) from Bellary. The airstrip would serve Bellary as well as nearby Hampi and Hospet. This decision resulted in protest from some citizens, who felt the airstrip would only benefit JVSL workers and who wanted Bellary Airport to be upgraded instead. The State Government responded by saying there was no space to extend and widen the runway to make it capable of receiving larger aircraft. Between December 2006 and 2009, the JVSL airstrip received flights from Bangalore and Goa by Air Deccan and later Kingfisher Red. There are now plans to build a new airport for Bellary.

In January 2006, the Airports Authority of India announced it would establish a radar station for air traffic control at Bellary Airport. Construction was carried out by the company Indra Sistemas and was completed by September 2011.

== Airfield ==
Bellary Airport has one runway, 12/30, which measures 1,106 by 15 metres (3,629 ft × 49 ft) and is connected to a single taxiway at its southern end.

== See also ==
- Jindal Vijaynagar Airport
- New Bellary Airport
