= Sanjay Ghodawat Group =

Indian conglomerate

- Type: Private
- Industry: Conglomerate
- Founded: 1993
- Founder: Sanjay Ghodawat
- Headquarters: Kolhapur, Maharashtra, India
- Area served: India
- Key people: Sanjay D. Ghodawat (Chairman); Shrenik Ghodawat (MD)
- Products: Aviation, consumer products, education, energy, chemicals, mining, software, realty, FMCG, retail, textiles
- Number of employees: 10,000+ (2022)
- Website: www.ghodawat.com

Sanjay Ghodawat Group is an Indian conglomerate, headquartered in Kolhapur, India. Its businesses include energy, aviation, consumer products, education, real estate, retail, and textiles. It was founded in 1993.

== History ==
Ghodawat Group, established in 1993, expanded its business into various sectors such as wind energy, high-tech agriculture, chemicals, flexible packaging, edible oils, real estate, and Fast-Moving Consumer Goods (FMCG). Within ten years of its establishment, the company achieved a turnover of ₹3.25 billion (US$75 million)..

In 2006, Ghodawat Group partnered with PVG group to set up STAR-PVG Exports and developed wind farms with over 50MW capacity in the states of Maharashtra, Karnataka, and Rajasthan, investing approximately ₹2 billion.

In 2008, the Sanjay Ghodawat Group, via its subsidiary Ghodawat Industries, ventured into wind turbine manufacturing through a partnership with the energy technology firm American Superconductor Corporation (AMSC). In 2009, Ghodawat Energy Pvt Ltd completed the commissioning of the Ghodawat 1650 Prototype at the Kaledhone site in Satara district, Maharashtra, which has received approval from the Centre for Wind Energy Technology (C-WET) and is registered under the Clean Development Mechanism (CDM).

In 2009, the group also expanded into the entertainment sector by collaborating with Percept Picture Company to produce a range of Hindi and Marathi Films, including Jail (2009) featuring Neil Nitin Mukesh, Carry On Pandu (2009), Bumm Bumm Bole (2010), and Jai Jai Maharashtra Maza (2012).

In 2014, the company entered the FMCG sector with its edible oil business, subsequently expanding its product range to include atta, pulses, rice, salt, snacks, and beverages, among other items.

In February 2018, the company divested a 250,000 sq ft property located in Embassy Golf Links Business Park, Bengaluru, for ₹350 crore ($54.5 million) to the investment firm The Xander Group. Ghodawat had initially acquired Embassy Golf Links Business Park in 2003.

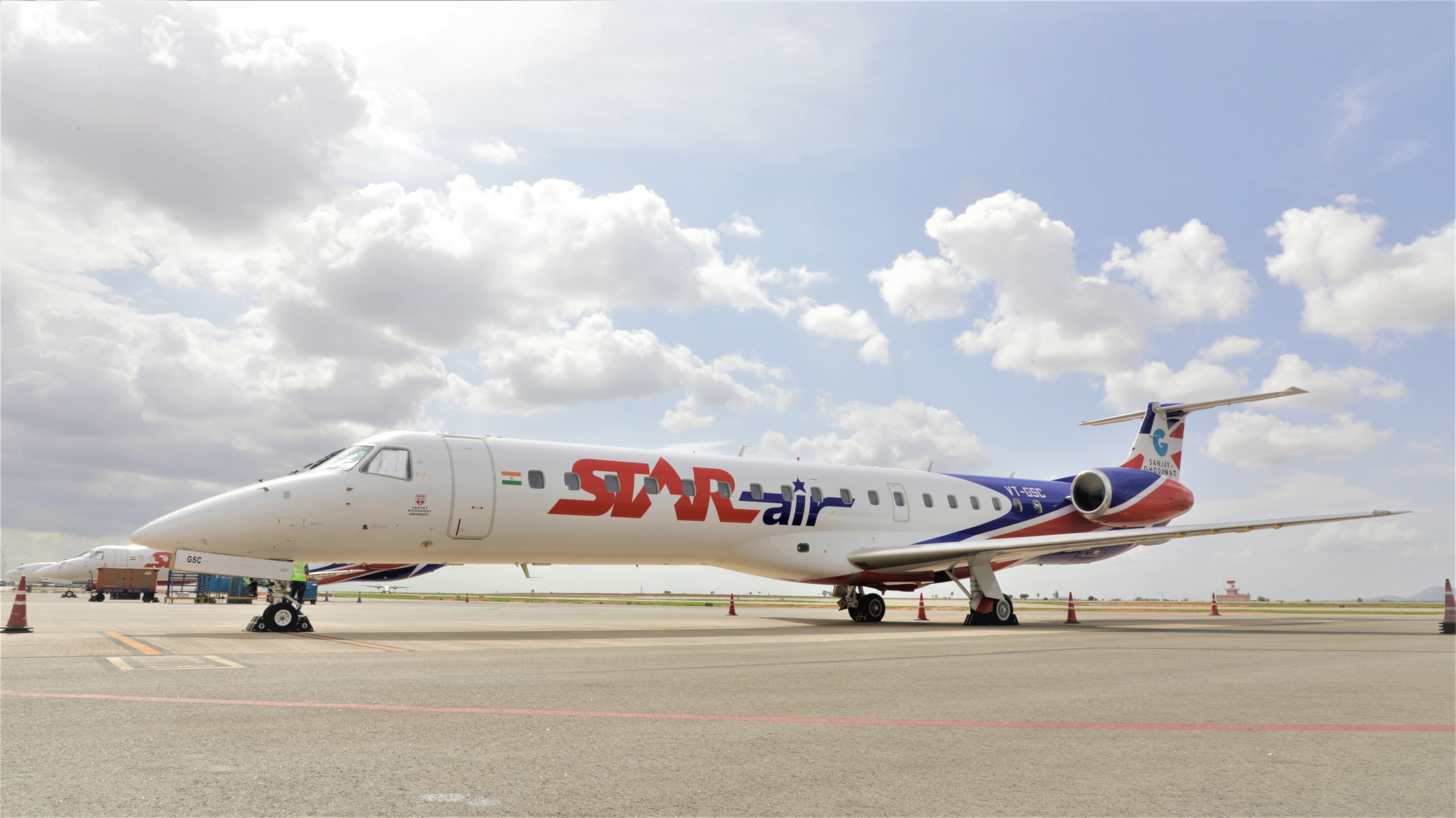
Star India's Embraer 145 parked at Kempegowda International Airport, Bangalore

The group ventured into the aviation industry by launching Star Air, a commuter airline in 2019 and currently operates in 17 locations.

== Subsidiaries ==
=== Ghodawat Agro ===
The company ventured into the floriculture industry in 2009. As of 2016, its subsidiary, Ghodawat Agro, supplies 300,000 flower stems daily. Additionally, the company cultivated a 60-acre ginger farm, along with various exotic herbs and vegetables near Kolhapur. Approximately 15% of their total flower production is exported to international markets, which include the United Kingdom, Japan, the Netherlands, Germany, Australia, and Greece. Its agro business includes a portfolio of herbs and vegetables like Chinese cabbage, iceberg lettuce, tarragon, ginger, chives, and oregano.

=== Ghodawat Energy ===
Established in 1993, Ghodawat Energy Limited (GEL) is involved in the manufacturing of wind turbines and towers, as well as power generation through its wind farms. As of 2023, the company produces 100 MW of wind power. GEL provides electricity to state electricity boards and private industries. Ghodawat Industries, operated as a subsidiary of Ghodawat Energy Limited has been engaged in the manufacturing of wind turbine towers. It has served clients such as Suzlon, Vestas, and Enercon. GEL owns and operates 165+ wind turbines with a total capacity of 105 MW. Ghodawat Energy has established outsourcing agreements with Jaki of Germany and DHI of China for the procurement of gearboxes, generators sourced from Elim of Austria, blades from Bangalore-based LM Glass, and electrical systems from American Superconductor. It had a revenue of ₹125 crore in 2013.

=== Star Air ===
Sanjay Ghodawat Group operates Star Air, an airline founded in 2017. Star Air commenced its flight operations as part of the Government of India's Ude Desh ka Aam Naagrik scheme, aimed at enhancing regional connectivity within India. As of 2022, Star Air offers scheduled flight services to 19 Indian destinations, including Ahmedabad, Ajmer (Kishangarh), Bengaluru, Belagavi, Delhi (Hindon), Hubli, Indore, Jodhpur, Kalaburagi, Mumbai, Nashik, Surat, Tirupati, Jamnagar, Hyderabad, Solapur, Nagpur, Bhuj, Raipur, Bidar, and Kolhapur. It became the largest regional airline in India in August 2023.

=== Ghodawat Consumer ===
Ghodawat Consumer Limited (GCL) is the FMCG arm of the Sanjay Ghodawat Group which was started as an edible oil business in 2014 and later expanded into staples and impulse categories. GCL manufactures all its products in-house, including atta, edible oil, pulses, rice, salt, snacks, namkeens, and fruit/vegetable-based crunchies. Notable beverages include Fizzinga, Frustar, Coolberg, and Rider. In FY23, GCL reported revenues exceeding ₹1,600 crore. In November 2022, the company acquired the non-alcoholic beverage brand Coolberg, with the financial terms of the transaction remaining undisclosed. In January 2023, the company acquired the packaged foods brand, To Be Honest as part of its strategy to enhance its premium packaged goods portfolio.

=== Star Localmart ===
The company operates Star Localmart, a retail chain of supermarkets in the states of Maharashtra and Karnataka. As of June 2023, it manages 80 stores under this brand, with 60 being company-owned and operated, while the remaining 20 operate under a franchise model. The supermarket business of Sanjay Ghodawat Group reported revenues of ₹22 crore during the financial year 2021–2022.

=== Sanjay Ghodawat University ===
Sanjay Ghodawat University was established as a state-private university in April 2017 following approval from the state cabinet. The institution holds a NAAC A grade accreditation. Its programs are accredited by the NBA. Sanjay Ghodawat University offers undergraduate, postgraduate, and PhD programs in technology, pharmacy, architecture, science, liberal arts, computer applications, management, and commerce.

== Financials ==
In the fiscal year 2014–2015, the Sanjay Ghodawat Group reported a turnover of ₹15 billion. Ghodawat Consumer Limited reported a revenue of ₹10 billion for the financial year ending in March 2021 and recorded revenue of ₹16 billion in the fiscal year 2023.

== CSR ==
The group has engaged in various corporate social responsibility (CSR) initiatives through its CSR arm, the Sanjay Ghodawat Foundation. SGF also operates a self-funded girls school, Kanya Mahavidyalaya in Kolhapur, providing education to more than 6000 girls from 52 villages since 1995. The foundation also runs the Acharya Shree Tulsi Blood Bank. The 'Mauli Old Age Home' under the Sanjay Ghodawat Foundation provides shelter, medical support, sustenance, and essential services to abandoned elderly individuals. The foundation operates a blind school in partnership with the National Federation of the Blind.

In 2018, in response to severe flooding in the states of Kerala and Karnataka, the foundation offered assistance by distributing food packets, clothing, and essential medicines. In 2019, the foundation made a charitable contribution of ₹5.1 million to help drought-affected farmers, which was presented to the former Chief Minister of Maharashtra, Devendra Fadnavis. It donated ₹5.1 million to the families of soldiers who lost their lives in the 2019 Pulwama attack. Employees, faculty members, and civil contractors associated with the group contributed to this donation.

== Awards and recognition ==
- The CSR division of the Sanjay Ghodawat Group received the Ahimsa International Award in 2022 for its contributions to CSR and sustainability. The award was presented by Bhagat Singh Koshyari, the former Governor of Maharashtra.
- In November 2022, the Sanjay Ghodawat Foundation received the Mahatma Award from the Aditya Birla Group.
- Ghodawat Consumer Limited received the 'Brand of the Year' award from The Times Group at the Times Power Brand 2022 for its 'STAR' brand.
- Ghodawat Consumer has been included in India's Top 500 Valuable Companies by Business Today magazine.
- In 2020, the Channelier FMCG Awards selected two of its products, Star Refined Oil and Ayurstar, from Ghodawat Mediatech as Brands of the Year.

== Controversies ==
In 2004, when the Government of Maharashtra imposed a ban on gutka, pan masala and flavoured tobacco, responding to this, Ghodawat Pan Masala Products filed a legal case against the ban. The Supreme Court of India ruled in favour of Ghodawat Pan Masala Products, asserting that 'since paan masala, gutkha, and supari are consumed for taste and nourishment, they all fall under the category of food.' Before this, Gutka manufacturers consistently challenged bans by arguing that gutkha was not a food item. The Supreme Court also overturned the ban and ruled that only the Central government had the authority to prohibit the sale of a food item. The case is known as Ghodawat Pan Masala Products and Ors. v. Union of India.

== See also ==
- List of companies of India
