= Gadiganuru railway station =

Railway station in Karnataka

Gadiganuru

General information
- Location: Gadiganuru, Ballari district, Karnatak; India
- Coordinates: 15°13′09″N 76°35′57″E
- Elevation: 492 metres (1,614 ft)
- System: Indian Railways station
- Owner: Indian Railways
- Operator: South Western Railway zone
- Line: Guntakal–Vasco da Gama line
- Platforms: 2
- Tracks: Double Electric-Line

Construction
- Structure type: Standard (on ground)

Other information
- Status: Functioning
- Station code: GNR
- Zone(s): South Western Railway zone
- Division(s): Hubballi

Services
Preceding station	Indian Railways	Following station
Toranagallu Junction towards ?	South Western Railway zone Guntakal–Vasco da Gama section	Bayaluvaddigeri towards ?
Location
- Interactive map

Gadiganuru railway station is a railway station located on the Guntakal–Vasco da Gama line operated by the South Western Railway zone under Hubballi railway division. It is situated at Gadiganuru in Ballari district in the Indian state of Karnatak.
