= Jindal Vijayanagar Airport =

Airport in Karnataka, India

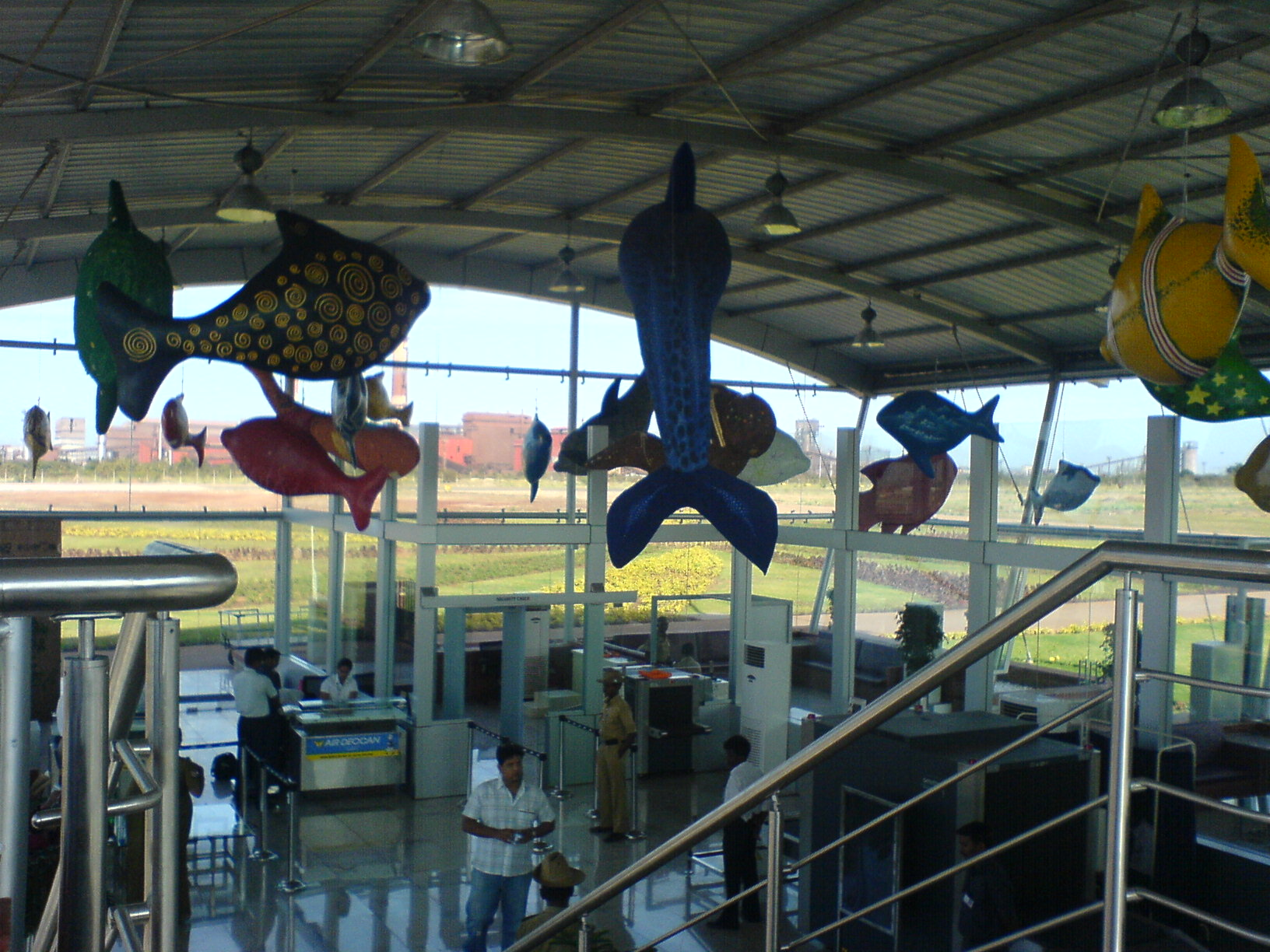
- IATA: VDY; ICAO: VOJV

Summary
- Airport type: Public
- Owner/Operator: JSW Steel
- Serves: Bellary, Hampi and Hospet
- Location: Toranagallu, Karnataka, India
- Opened: 1997; 29 years ago
- Elevation AMSL: 508 m (1,667 ft)
- Coordinates: 15.1750°N 76.6341°E

Map
- Location of airport in Karnataka VDY (India)

Runways
Direction	Length		Surface
Direction	m	ft	Surface
13/31	1,589	5,213	Asphalt

Statistics (April 2025 – March 2026)
- Passengers: 16,801 (▼ -63.7%)
- Aircraft movements: 801 (▼ -41.7%)
- Cargo tonnage: —
- Source: AAI

Jindal Vijayanagar Airport (IATA: VDY, ICAO: VOJV), also known as Vidyanagar Airport, is a public airport serving Bellary, Hampi and Hospet in Karnataka, India. It is located between Vidyanagar Township and a steel mill owned by JSW Steel in Toranagallu. The airport was built by Jindal Vijayanagar Steel, which later changed its name to JSW Steel. It opened in 1997 and began handling commercial flights in December 2006.

== History ==
Jindal Vijayanagar Steel built the airport next to its plant in Toranagallu for use by senior employees. It began operations in 1997. In 2004, the government of Karnataka announced that the airstrip would be upgraded to serve as the new commercial airport for Bellary, which was 30 kilometres (19 mi) away. Air Deccan planned to fly to the airfield. Bellary already had an airport; however, officials said its runway was not long enough and there was no room to extend it. The government also hoped that Jindal Vijayanagar Airport would attract tourists bound for Hampi. In 2006, the company, now known as JSW Steel, constructed a terminal building at a cost of ₹25 crore (US$2.6 million). Karnataka governor T. N. Chaturvedi inaugurated the airport in November 2006, and Air Deccan launched flights to Bangalore and Goa the following month.

== Facilities ==
Jindal Vijayanagar Airport has one asphalt runway designated 13/31. It measures 1,956 by 30 metres (6,417 ft × 98 ft). The waiting area in the terminal seats 50 people.

== Airlines and destinations ==
Between April 2023 and March 2024, the airport handled 43,140 passengers and had 1,228 aircraft movements.

Airlines	Destinations
Alliance Air	Bengaluru, Hyderabad
Star Air	Bengaluru

== See also ==
- List of airports in Karnataka
