= Roland Hampe =

German classical archaeologist

Roland Hampe (2 December 1908 - 23 January 1981) was a German classical archaeologist. From 1959-1975 he was a professor at Heidelberg University. He was the son of German historian Karl Hampe (1869-1936). During World War II Hampe was a Wehrmacht interpreter in Greece. He was elected to the American Philosophical Society in 1979.
