= Helmut Hampe =

German ornithologist and music educator (1896–1939)

Helmut Hampe (19 November 1896 – 22 August 1939) was a German aviculturist with an interest mainly in the parrot-family. Injured in World War I, he was forced to live most of his subsequent life indoors. He conducted experiments on hybridization and examined the genetics of colour inheritance in some bird species.

== Life and work ==
Hampe was born in Leipzig, the son of neurologist Julius and Emma née Claassen. The family moved to Braunschweig where his father was a director of the Braunschweig Animal Protection Society. Hampe went to school at the humanist Wilhelm Gymnasium from 1907 and became interested in natural history. He was in secondary school when World War I broke out and at the age of 14 he volunteered and served on the front lines in Russia and France. He was wounded and gun shot in the lung led to lung disease. In 1919, he was discharged from the army and he went to study medicine at the University of Giessen. He was unable to complete studies due to poor health and he began to study music in Sondershausen which too he had to abandon due to poor health. He moved back to Braunschweig and passed a music teacher's exam in 1924 and gave violin and piano lessons for the next six years. In 1921 he married Hedwig Wesche and he began to write extensively on nature and bird conservation. He also began to keep birds, and began to breed them and study their life-history. He wrote a complete book on the budgerigar in 1923, and wrote extensively in Die Gefiederte Welt, Vögel ferner Länder, Ornithologische Monatsberichte, Avicultural Magazine, and the Journal für Ornithologie. He worked for some time as a bird ringers at the Heligoland Bird Observatory. He conducted some bird hybridization experiments and wrote about house martin-barn swallow hybrids. He wrote comprehensive notes on the birds that he raised including on Platycercus icterotis, Platycercus eximius, Psephotus haematonotus, Neophema bourkii, Neophema elegans, Neophema chrysostomus, and Psephotus varius. He converted a balcony into an open aviary in which he spent a lot of time sitting in deck chair surrounded by birds. He died an early death from the war injuries and subsequent health problems. His book Die Unzertrennlichen (1934) on lovebirds was reprinted in 1953 and again in 1957.
