= Karl Hampe =

German historian (1869–1936)

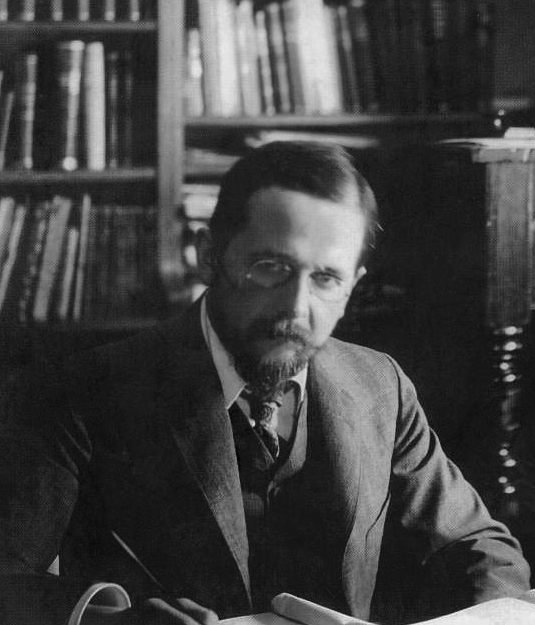
Karl Hampe ca. 1913

Karl Ludwig Hampe (3 February 1869 – 14 February 1936) was a German historian of the Middle Ages, particularly the history of the Holy Roman Empire in the High Middle Ages.

Hampe was born in Bremen and graduated from Berlin in 1893. Following graduation, he spent five years as an employee of the Monumenta Historica Germaniae. In Bonn Hampe met his later wife Charlotte Rauff, daughter of Heidelberg geologist Hermann Rauff. On 2 March 1903 he married at the age of 34, Rauff (19 years old). They had four sons and three daughters. Among them architect Hermann Hampe and archaeologist Roland Hampe. In 1903 he was appointed to a professorship in medieval history and historical auxiliary sciences at Ruprecht Karl University of Heidelberg. In 1924/25 he served as university rector. Hampe remained at Heidelberg until 1933 when he refused to cooperate with the increasing pressure put on universities by the new Nazi-led government of Germany and resigned his professorship. He died in Heidelberg.

== Published works ==
Hampe's major historical works include Deutsche Kaisergeschichte in der Zeit der Salier und Staufer, later translated into English and published as "Germany under the Salian and Hohenstaufen emperors" (1974). Other significant works by Hampe include:

- Geschichte Konradins von Hohenstaufen, 1893 – History of Conradin of Hohenstaufen.
- Kaiser Friedrich II., der Hohenstaufe, 1899 – Kaiser Friedrich II.
- Mittelalterliche Geschichte, 1922 – Medieval history.
- Die Aktenstücke zum Frieden von S. Germano 1230, 1926 – Filed documents associated with the Peace of San Germano 1230.
- Herrschergestalten des deutschen Mittelalters, 1927 – Ruling figures of the German Middle Ages.
- Das Hochmittelalter. Geschichte des Abendlandes von 900 bis 1250, 1932 – The High Middle Ages. History of the West 900-1250.

== See also ==
- Roland Hampe
