= Ariulf Eric Hampe =

Ariulf Eric Hampe (22 November 1922 – 28 May 2009) was a German immigrant who migrated to the United States. He was instrumental in designing the Saturn V rocket, along with Wernher von Braun, which landed the first man on the moon.
