= Sirivaram =

Sirivara
- village
- Location in Karnataka, India Sirivara (India)
- Coordinates: 15.15°N 76.92°E
- Country: India
- State: Karnataka
- District: Bellary
- Talukas: Bellary

Government
  - Body: Gram panchayat

Population (2001)
  - Total: 5,045

Languages
  - Official: Kannada
- Time zone: UTC+5:30 (IST)
- ISO 3166 code: IN-KA
- Vehicle registration: KA
- Website: karnataka.gov.in

Sirivaram is a village in the southern state of Karnataka, India. It is located in the Bellary taluk of Bellary district in Karnataka.

== Demographics ==
As of 2001 India census, Sirivaram had a population of 5045 with 2554 males and 2491 females.

== See also ==
- Bellary
- Districts of Karnataka
