= Toranagallu =

- village
- Location within Karnataka Location within India
- Coordinates: 15.07°N 76.55°E
- Country: India
- State: Karnataka
- District: Ballary
- Taluk: Sandur

Population (2001)
  - village: 6,324
  - Metro: 25,000

Languages
  - Official: Kannada, English
- Time zone: UTC+5:30 (IST)
- Vehicle registration: KA 34

Toranagallu, or Torangal, is a village in the southern state of Karnataka, India. It is located in the Sandur taluk of Ballari district in Karnataka.

== Demographics ==
As of 2001 India census, Toranagallu had a population of 6324 with 3390 males and 2934 females.

== Transport ==
By road: NH 63 is via Toranagallu. It is presently under a massive transformation, upgrading to a four-lane road. The nearest cities to Toranagallu are Bellary and Hospet, which are each approximately 30 km from Toranagallu. Buses operating between Bellary and Hospet go via Toranagallu; the journey takes about 40–45 mins from Bellary to Hospet and vice versa.

By train: Trains operating between major centres stop at Toranagallu (TNGL).

By air: Jindal Vijaynagar Airport is located southwest of the village. Although it belongs to JSW Steel, the airport receives TruJet flights from Hyderabad and Bangalore daily.

== See also ==
- Districts of Karnataka
