= Hospet =

City in Karnataka, India

Hosapete
- City
- Hosapete
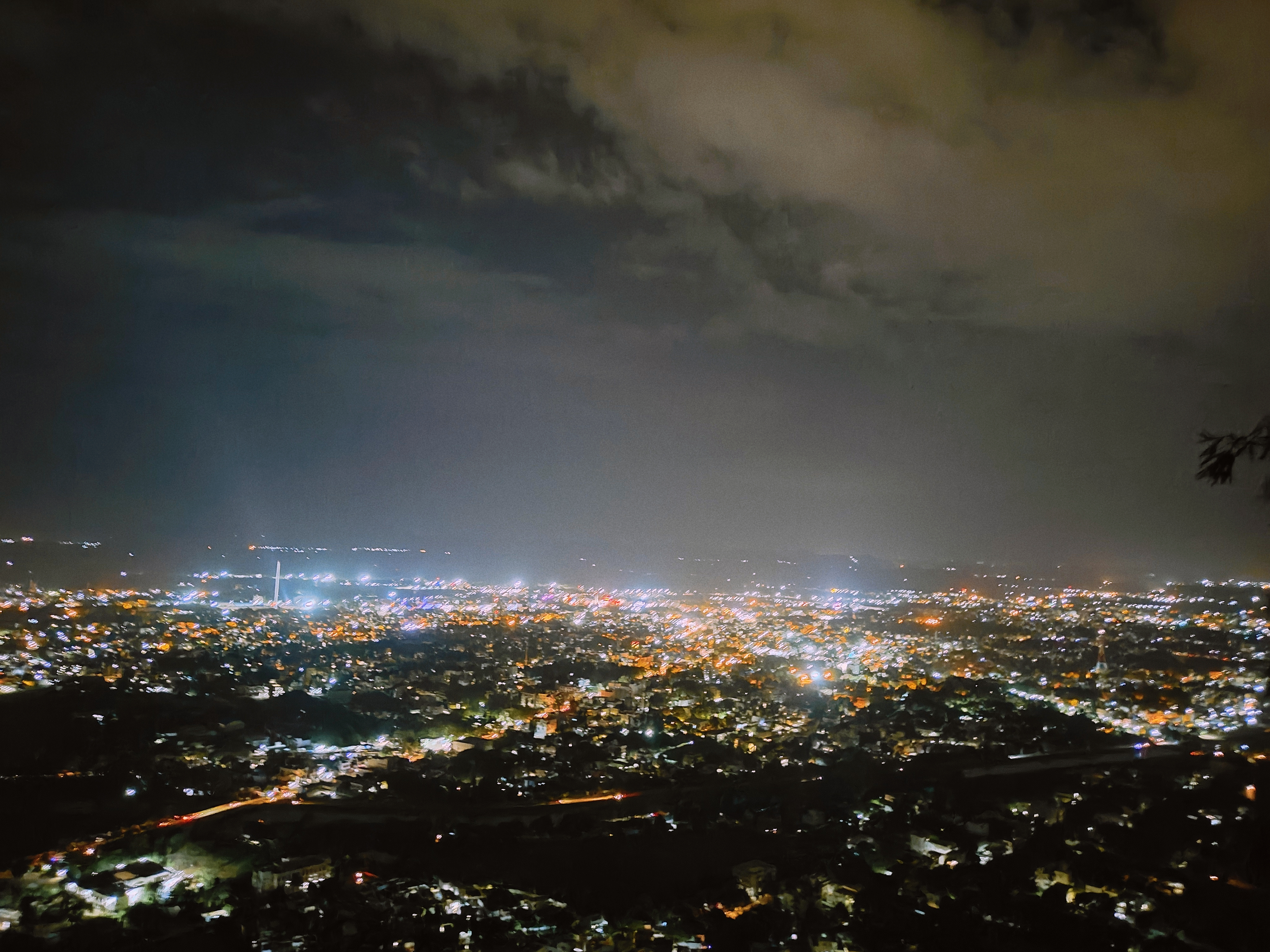
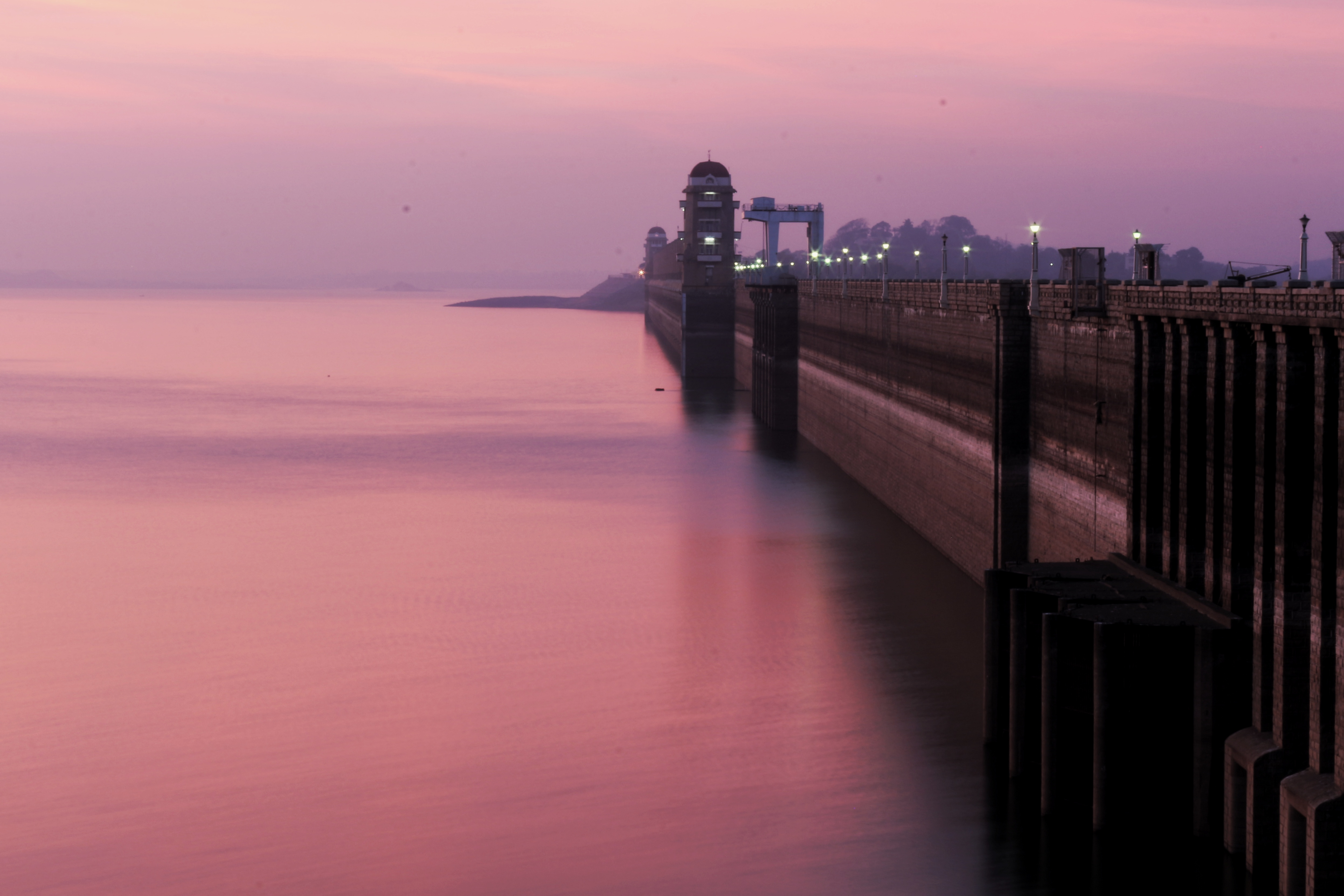
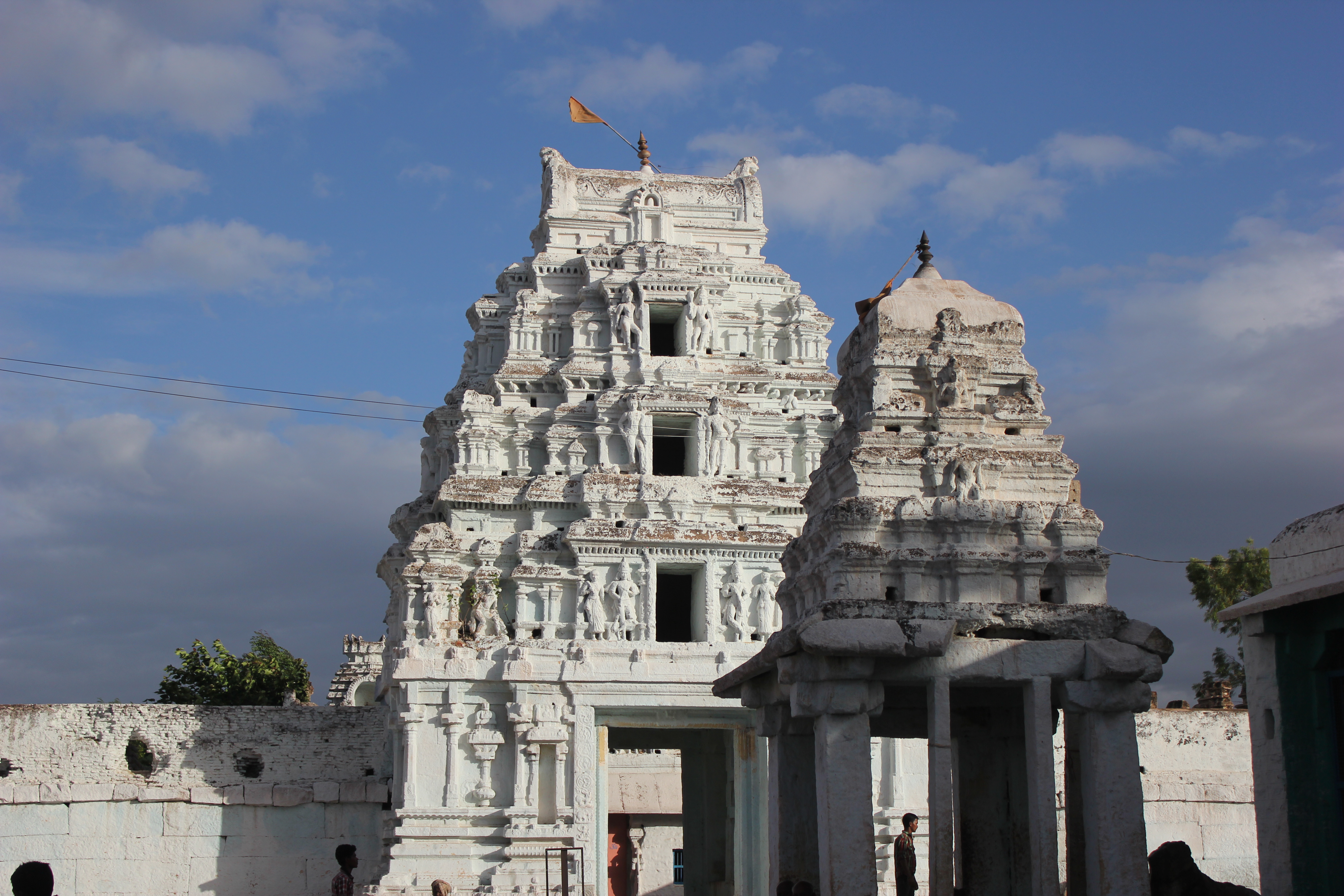
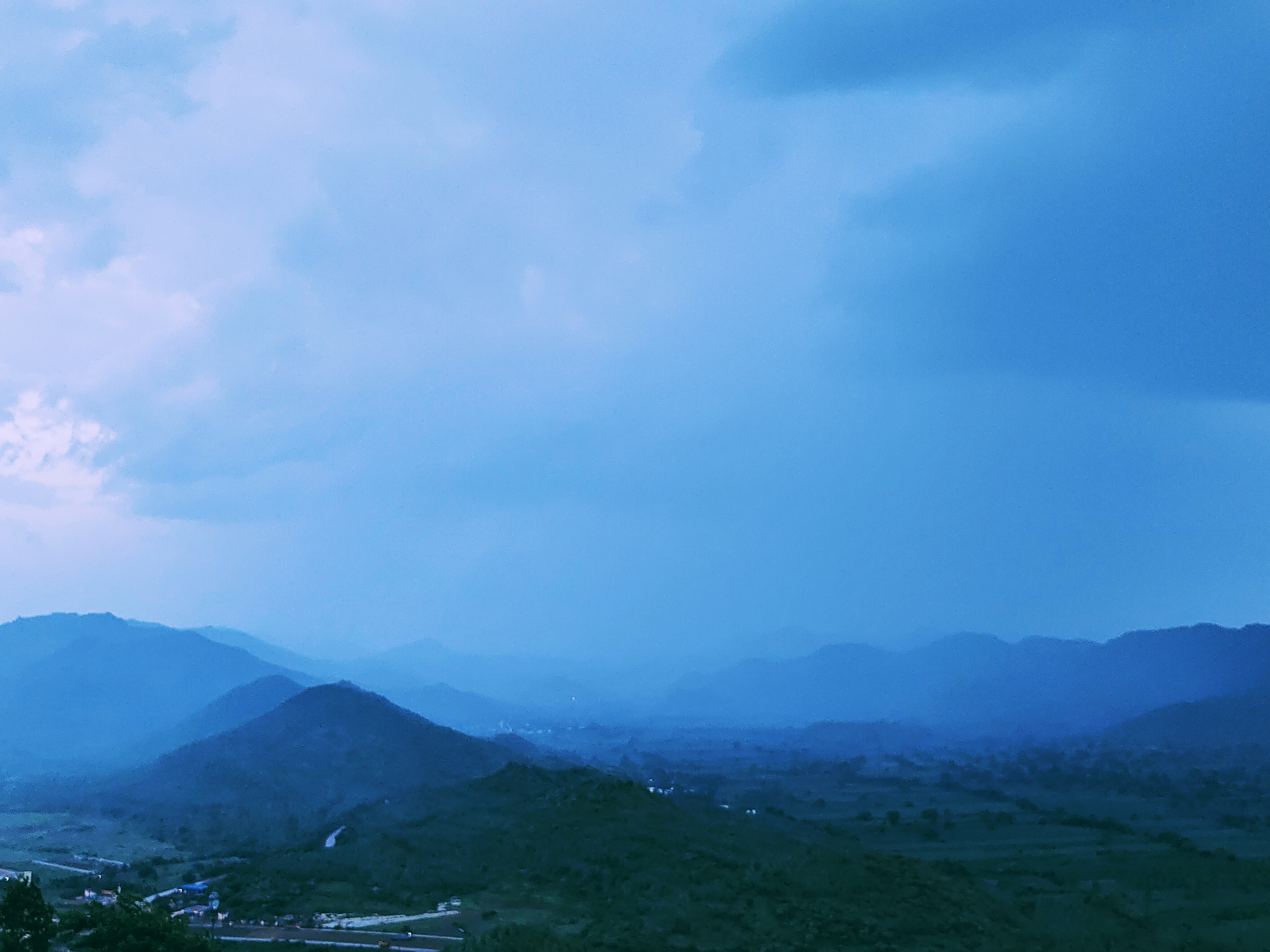
- The Hospet cityscape viewed from atop the Joladarashi Gudda Tungabadhra Dam near Hospet Mallikarjuna temple, Hospet View from Joladarashi Gudda
- Nicknames: Steel City, Back Door of Vijayanagara
- Location in Karnataka, India
- Coordinates: 15.2689°N 76.3909°E
- Country: India
- State: Karnataka
- District: Vijayanagara
- Talukas: Hospet
- Established: 1520 (506 years ago)
- Founder: Krishnadevaraya
- Named for: Nagalapura

Government
  - Body: City Municipal Council

Area
  - City: 70.12 km^{2} (27.07 sq mi)
- Elevation: 479 m (1,572 ft)

Population (2011)
  - City: 206,167
  - Rank: 224th India, 14th Karnataka
  - Density: 2,940/km^{2} (7,615/sq mi)
  - Metro: 244,048

Languages
  - Official: Kannada
- Time zone: UTC+5:30 (IST)
- PIN: 583 201, 02, 03, 11, 23, 25
- Telephone code: (+91)8394
- Vehicle registration: KA-35
- Website: http://www.hospetcity.mrc.gov.in

Hospet (officially Hosapete) is the largest and fastest-growing industrial city and district headquarters of the Vijayanagara district in the Indian state of Karnataka. Hospet is known as "the steel city of Karnataka". It is located on the bank of the Tungabhadra River and is 13 km (8.1 mi) from Hampi (Vijayanagar). Hampi was once the capital of the Vijayanagara Empire, and has been designated a UNESCO World Heritage Site. Hospet is the connecting link between North and South Karnataka. It is 333 km (207 mi) from the state capital Bengaluru. Hospet, officially known as Hosapete, is a major city in the Vijayanagara district of Karnataka, India.

Founded by the great Vijayanagara ruler Krishna Deva Raya in honor of his mother Nagamma, Hospet lies on the banks of the Tungabhadra River and serves as the gateway to the world-famous UNESCO heritage site, Hampe.

== History ==
Hospet was built in 1520 AD by Krishna Deva Raya, one of the prominent rulers of Vijayanagara Empire. He built the city in honour of his mother Naagalaambika. The city was originally named Naagalapura; however, people referred to the city as Hosa Pete, which means "New City". The area between Hampi and Hospet is still called Naagalapura. This was the main entrance to the city of Vijayanagara for travellers coming from the west coast.

The current MLA for this area is Anand Singh. The government approved a request to rename the city in October 2014, and Hospet was renamed "Hosapete" on 1 November 2014.

The city is currently home to the tallest flagpole in the nation. During the Independence day on 15 August 2022, Hospet hoisted the tallest national flag on a 405 ft (123 m) pole.

== Geography ==
Hospet is well connected to several important cities in India. Some major cities like Bengaluru, Pune, Hyderabad, Chennai are connected by roadways and railways. Ballari is located approximately 60 km (37 mi) away. Hosapete Junction railway station lies on Hubballi-Guntakal railway line. The nearest airport from the city is Jindal Vijaynagar Airport approximately 30 km (19 mi) away from Hospet which serves flights to and from Bengaluru and Hyderabad every day. Bengaluru is 330 km (210 mi) away. In addition, the city has a well-developed market area. Hospet is a well-known tourist destination, mainly due to its proximity to Hampi and Tungabhadra Dam.

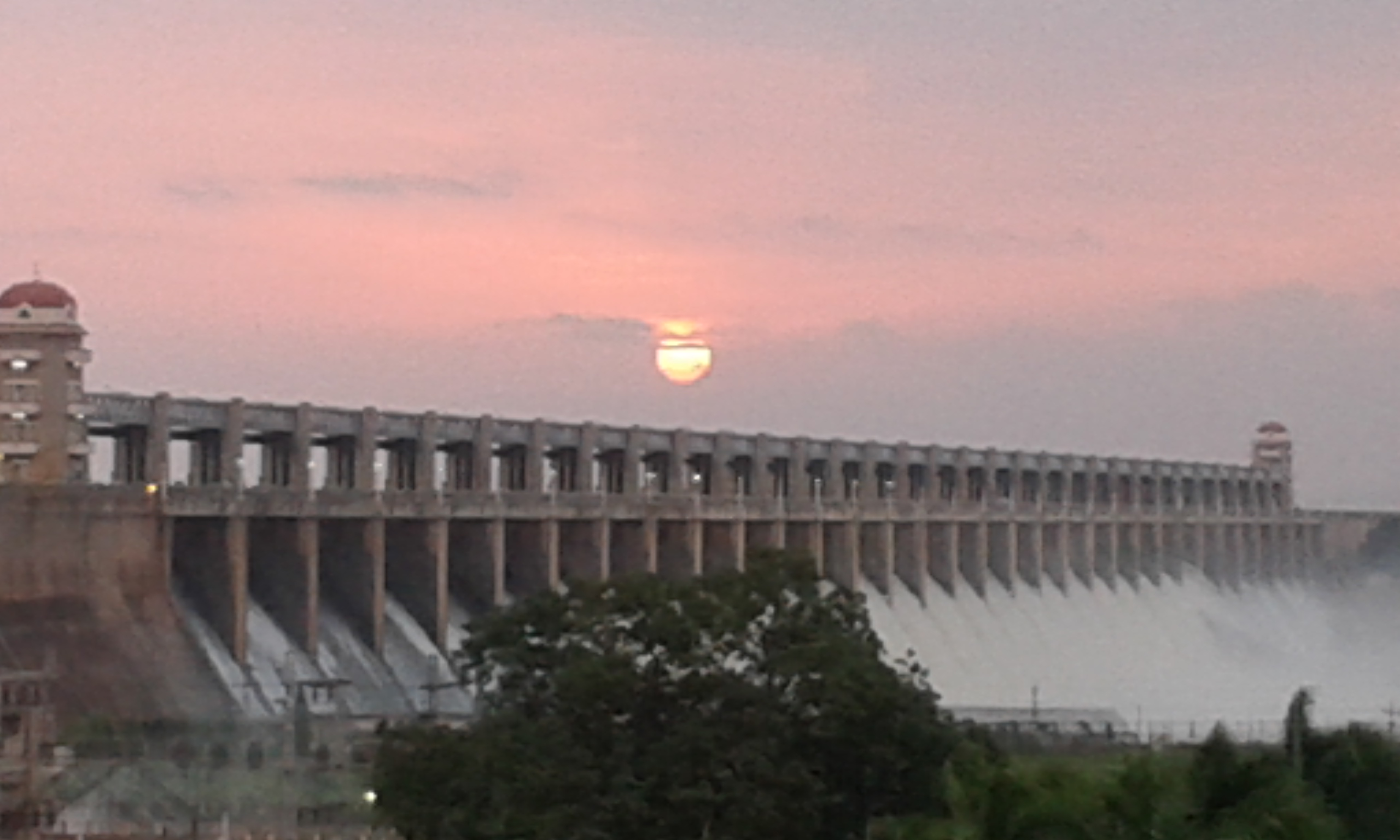
T.B. DAM

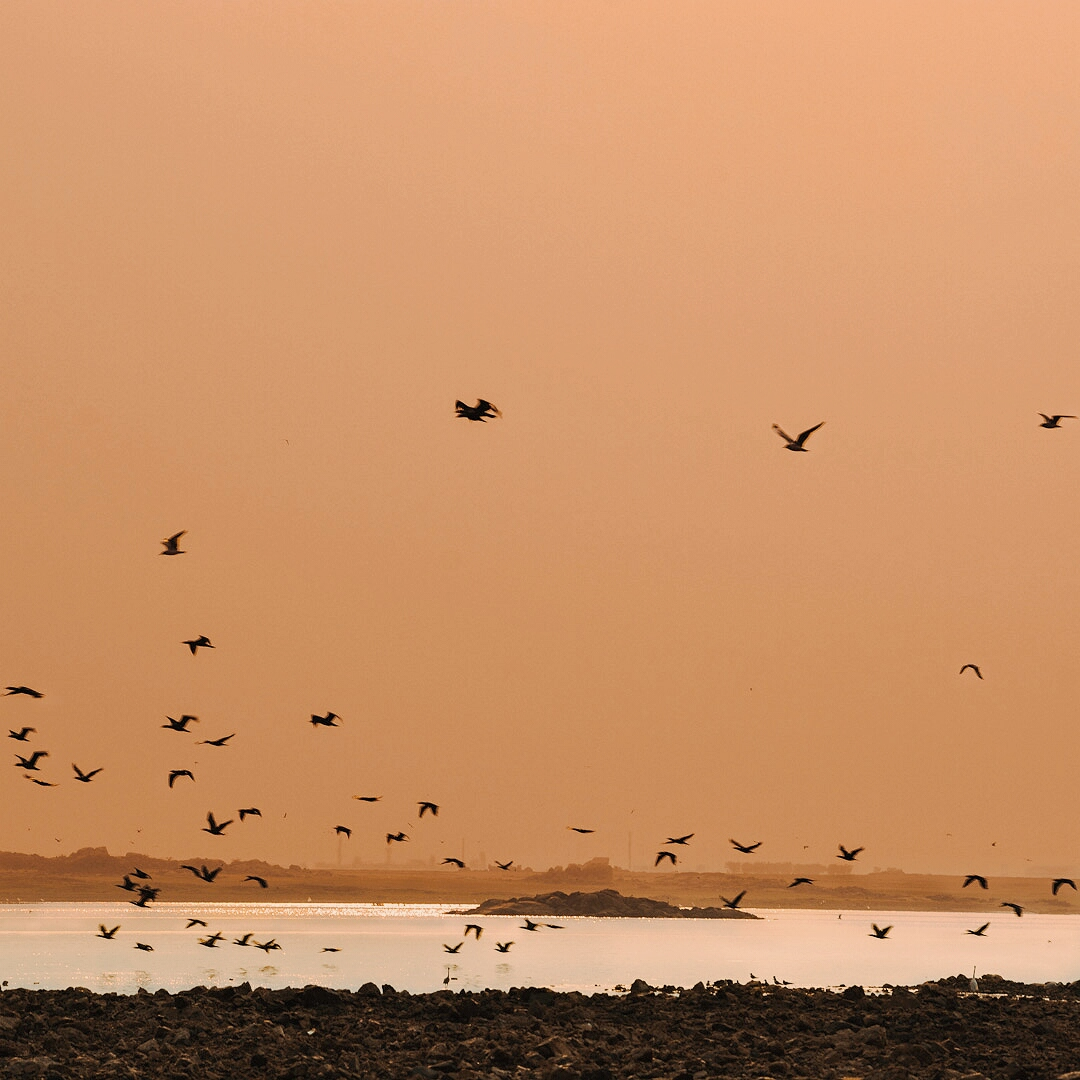
Tungabhadra Lake

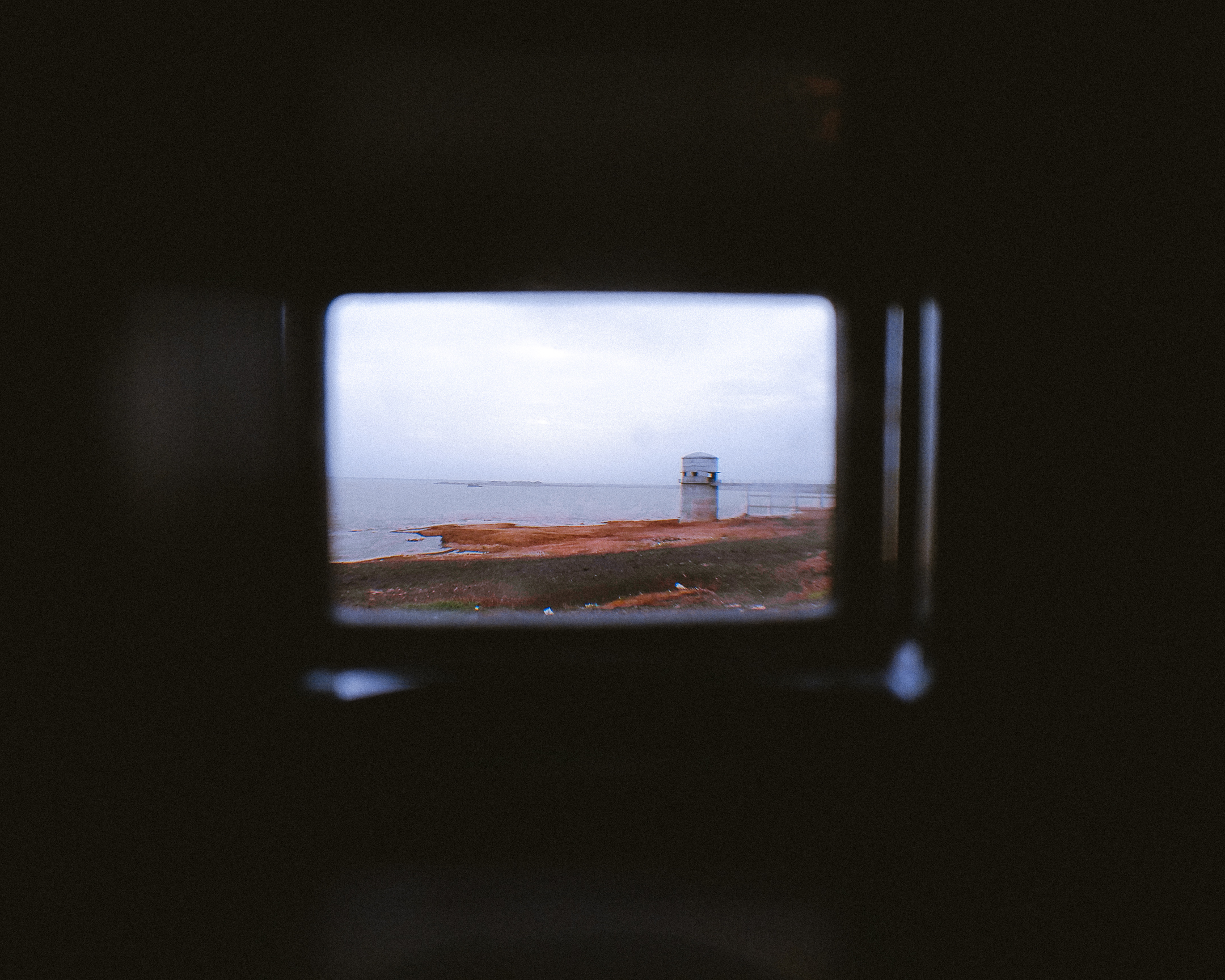
Lighthouse

== Demographics ==
Religions in Hospet city (2011)
Religion	Percent
Hinduism	72.42%
Islam	25.04%
Christianity	1.28%
Jainism	1.05%
Other or not stated	0.21%

According to the 2011 census, the total population of Hospet was 206,167, of which 102,668 are male and 103,499 are female. The town has an average literacy rate of 79.30%, with male literacy at 85.95% and female literacy at 72.74%. In Hospet, 13.46% of the population is under 6 years of age.

=== Languages ===
Languages of Hospet (2011)
1. Kannada (53.1%)
2. Urdu (23.3%)
3. Telugu (11.3%)
4. Tamil (4.95%)
5. Hindi (2.83%)
6. Marathi (1.54%)
7. Others (2.94%)

At the time of the 2011 census, 53.14% of the population in the city spoke Kannada, 23.31% Urdu, 11.29% Telugu, 4.95% Tamil, 2.83% Hindi and 1.54% Marathi as their first language.
