= List of Zoroastrians =

This is a list of Zoroastrians with a Wikipedia article.

== From Greater Iran ==
- Zartosht Bahram-e Pazhdo
- Turan Bahrami Shahriari (1931-2024)
- Cyrus the Great (c. 600–530 BC): commonly known as Cyrus the Great, and also called Cyrus the Elder by the Greeks, was the founder of the Achaemenid Empire, the first Persian Empire. Under his rule, the empire embraced all the previous civilized states of the ancient Near East, expanded vastly and eventually conquered most of Western Asia and much of Central Asia.
- Darius the Great (c. 550–486 BCE): was the fourth Persian king of the Achaemenid Empire.
- Esfandiar Ekhtiyari (1966-)
- Jamshid Bahman Jamshidian (1851–1933): pioneer of modern banking in Iran.
- Rostam Giv (1888-1980)
- Mina Izadyar (1949-2013)
- Iraj Kaboli (1938-2021)
- Kartir
- Katayun Mazdapour (1943-)
- Farhang Mehr (1923·2018): former Deputy Prime Minister of Iran
- Afarin Neyssari
- Sepanta Niknam (1985-)
- Keikhosrow Shahrokh (1864–1929): proponent of the Iranian civil calendar and designer of the Ferdowsi mausoleum.
- Tansar
- Trita Parsi
- Karan Vafadari
- Roxanne Varza (1985-)
- Xerxes I (519–465 BC): called Xerxes the Great, was the fifth king of kings of the Achaemenid dynasty of Persia.
- Farangis Yeganegi (1916-2010)
- Kambiz Yeganegi (1948-)

Families

- Seven Achaemenid clans
- Seven Great Houses of Iran

== In science and industry ==
- Aban Pestonjee (born 1936): Sri Lankan entrepreneur
- Adi Bulsara (born 1952): physicist
- Adi Kanga (1923–2013): Indian Civil engineer, planned city of Navi Mumbai and Vashi bridge
- Ardaseer Cursetjee (1808–1877) of the Wadia shipbuilding family: first Indian elected Fellow of the Royal Society
- Ardeshir Darabshaw Shroff (1899–1965): Indian economist; delegate at the 1944 Bretton Woods Conference; co-author of the Bombay Plan; founder-director of the Investment Corporation of India; first Indian chairman of the Bank of India
- Ardeshir Godrej (1868–1936): Indian inventor; co-founder (with his brother Piroj) of the Godrej industries which does not include Godrej & Boyce. His son now runs Godrej Properties, an aggregator model based real estate development firm.
- Avabai Jamsetjee Jeejeebhoy (1793–1870) Lady: continued her husband Sir Jamsetji Jeejeebhoy philanthropic work; builder of Mahim Causeway, connects two islands of Bombay and Salsette (north Bombay)
- Ardeshir Cowasjee (1926–2012): Pakistani newspaper columnist, social activist, and philanthropist
- Byram Dinshawji Avari (1942-2023): Pakistan hotelier; founder and chairman of the Avari Group of companies
- Dinshaw Patel (b. 1942): Professor at Memorial Sloan Kettering; member of the National Academy of Sciences
- Zubin Damania (born 1973), physician, comedian, internet personality, musician, and founder of Turntable Health
- Byramjee Jeejeebhoy (1822–1890) Esq., CSI: Indian philanthropist and founder of B.J. Medical College, Pune
- Cowasjee Jehangir, Sir (1879–1962): Indian civil engineer; master constructor of Bombay
- Cowasji Shavaksha Dinshaw (Adenwalla) (1827–1900): Indian entrepreneur
- Cowasji Jehangir Readymoney Sir, (1812–1878): 1st Baronet, philanthropist, including various academic buildings of the Bombay University
- Cyrus Chothia (1942–2019): molecular biologist
- Cyrus Pallonji Mistry (1968–2022): former chairman of Tata Group; Irish businessman
- Cyrus Poonawalla (born 1945): Indian Industrialist, pharmacologist; co-founder of the Serum Institute of India
- Dhunjibhoy Bomanji, Sir (1862–1937): Indian Shipping Magnate, philanthropist
- Dinshaw Maneckji Petit, Sir (1823–1901): founded the first textile factories in India
- Dorabji Tata, Sir (1859–1932): Indian industrialist and philanthropist, Sir Dorab Tata Trust
- Fardunjee Marzban (1787–1847): publisher, founded the first vernacular newspaper on the Indian subcontinent Bombay Samachar
- Feroze Gandhi (1912–1960): publisher of The National Herald and The Navjivan newspapers and husband of Indira Gandhi, former Prime Minister of India
- Framji Cowasji Banaji, Esq (1767 – 12 February 1851): merchant, philanthropist, lease holder of Powai
- Homi Jehangir Bhabha (1909–1966): nuclear scientist and first chairman of the Indian Atomic Energy Commission
- Homi Maneck Mehta, Sir (1871–1948): industrialist in textiles, insurance, banking, chemicals & sugar. Represented India at League of Nations, Chairman of Bombay War Gift Fund and President of Victory Thanksgiving Fund.
- Homi Nusserwanji Sethna (1923–2010): Padma Vibhushan awardee, chemical engineer; guided the development of India's first nuclear explosive device
- Sir Hormusjee Naorojee Mody (1838–1911): financier and industrialist in Hong Kong. He contributed $150,000 to help establish the University of Hong Kong.
- Sir Temulji Bhicaji Nariman (1848–1940): obstetrician. Co-founded one of Bombay's first Lying-in hospitals in 1887 and was knighted in 1914 for his work during the plague epidemic in India at the turn of the 19th century.
- Jehangir Ratanji Dadabhoy (J. R. D.) Tata (1904–1993): industrialist; founder of Air India, India's first commercial airline
- Jamsetji Jeejeebhoy, Sir (1783–1859): opened sea trade with China; philanthropist, J J Hospital
- Jamsetji Tata (1839–1904): industrialist; founder of the Tata Group of companies, titled a "One-Man Planning Commission" by Jawaharlal Nehru
- Jehangir Ghandy, Sir (1896–1972): built Tata Steel in Jamshedpur
- Jehangir Hormusjee Ruttonjee (1880–1960): industrialist; founded Hong Kong's first brewery; established the first anti-tuberculosis sanatorium in the Andajat
- Lovji Nusserwanjee Wadia (1702–1774): shipwright and naval architect; builder of the first dry-dock in Asia
- Nadirshaw Edulji Dinshaw (1862–1922): industrialist and philanthropist; NED Engineering College
- Nariman Mehta (1920–2014): organic chemist and inventor of bupropion, the most commonly used antidepressant drug
- Nergis Mavalvala (born 1968): astrophysicist and professor at MIT
- Neville Wadia (1911–1996): businessman and son-in-law of Muhammad Ali Jinnah
- Nusli Wadia (born 1944): chairman of the Wadia Group
- Ness Wadia (born 1972): joint-managing director of Bombay Dyeing
- Noshir Gowadia (born 1944): aircraft engineer and convicted spy
- Nowroji Saklatwala (1875–1938): Chairman of Tata group of companies from 1932 until his death by heart attack in 1938
- Pallonji Mistry (1929–2022): construction tycoon
- Pirojsha Burjorji Godrej (1882–1972): entrepreneur; co-founder (with his brother Ardeshir) of the Godrej industrial empire
- Ratan Tata (1937–2024): chairman emeritus of Tata Sons; former chairman of the Tata Group of companies; member of the central board of the Reserve Bank of India
- Russi Mody (1918–2014): former Chairman and Managing Director of Tata Steel Limited; son of Sir Homi Mody and brother of Piloo Mody
- Rustom Jal Vakil (1911–1974): cardiologist
- Ratanji Dadabhoy Tata (1856–1926): a noted chairperson of Tata Group and Tata Sons; father of J. R. D. Tata
- Sir Sorabji Nusserwanji Pochkhanawala (1881–1937): banker, co-founder of the Central Bank of India
- Shenaz Treasury (born 1981): actress and vlogger
- Shiraz Minwalla (born 1972): theoretical physicist, string theorist
- Spenta R. Wadia (born 1950): theoretical physicist
- Ratanji Tata (1871–1918), Sir: younger son of Jamsetji Tata; industrialist and philanthropist; Sir Ratan Tata Trust
- Villoo Morawala-Patell (born 1955): MD of Avesthagen, Officer of the National Order of Merit holder

== In academia ==
- Homi K. Bhabha (born 1949): cultural-studies theorist; Professor, Harvard University
- Jamshed Bharucha (born 1956): President, Cooper Union. Formerly, Dean of the Faculty of Arts & Sciences at Dartmouth College (first Indian American to serve as the dean of a school at an Ivy League institution)
- Mahzarin Banaji (born 1956): Professor of Psychology, Harvard University
- Noshir Contractor (born 1959): Award-winning Professor of Behavioral Sciences, Communication and Management at Northwestern University
- Rusi Taleyarkhan: Professor of Nuclear Engineering at Purdue University
- Rohinton Kamakaka: Professor of Molecular Cell Developmental biology at University of California, Santa Cruz
- J.K. Mehta (1901-1980): Jamshed Kaikhusroo Mehta, known professionally as J.K. Mehta, was a well-regarded Indian economist of Parsi descent who published several theories of economics in books and papers, and served as Professor of Economics in Allahabad University during his storied career.
- Thrity Umrigar (born 1961): Armitage Professor of English at Case Western Reserve University
- N. H. Wadia (1925–2016): Prominent neurologist; Director of Neurology at Grant Medical College and Sir J. J. Group of Hospitals for 25 years
- Vistasp Karbhari: President, University of Texas at Arlington
- Homi Kharas (born 1959): deputy director for the global economy and development program at the Brookings Institution
- Ness B. Shroff: Ohio Eminent Scholar of Networking and Communications, and Chaired Professor of Electrical and Computer Engineering and Computer Science and Engineering at The Ohio State University

== Military ==
- Field Marshal Sam Manekshaw (1914–2008): Former Indian Chief of Army Staff and the first Indian with the rank of Field Marshal
- Lieutenant General FN Billimoria (1933–2005): Former Indian Army officer and head of Wellington Cantonment, father of Indo-British entrepreneur Karan Bilimoria, Lord Bilimoria
- Admiral Jal Cursetji (1919–1991): Former Chief of the Naval Staff, Indian Navy
- Air Marshal Aspy Engineer (1912–2002): Former Chief of the Air Staff, Indian Air Force
- Air Marshal Minoo Merwan Engineer (1921–1997): Former Indian Air Force AOC-in-Chief of Eastern and Western Air Commands
- Vice Admiral Rustom K. S. Ghandhi (1924–2014): Indian Navy Commander-in-Chief, Western Naval Command and former Aide-de-camp to Governor-General of India Lord Louis Mountbatten
- Kavasji Jamshedji Petigara (1877–1941): First Indian Deputy Commissioner of the Mumbai Police
- Lieutenant General Adi M. Sethna (died 2006): Former Vice Chief of the Army Staff, Indian Army
- J. P. B. Jeejeebhoy (1891–1950), first Indian pilot in the Royal Flying Corps
- Lieutenant Colonel Ardeshir Tarapore (1923–1965):, Indian Army officer and commanding officer of the Poona Horse, winner of the Param Vir Chakra, India's highest award for gallantry
- Air Chief Marshal Fali Homi Major (born 1947): Former Chief of the Air Staff of the Indian Air Force
- Major General Cyrus Addie Pithawalla (born 1957): Recipient of the Ashoka Chakra

== In entertainment, religion, sports ==
- Aban Marker Kabraji (born 1953): Pakistani ecologist, Asian regional director of IUCN
- Amyra Dastur (born 1993): model, film actress, television presenter
- Anaita Shroff Adajania (born 1972): fashion stylist and film actress
- Alaya Furniturewala (born 1998): model and film actress
- Aneela Mirza, or Anila Mirza (born 8 October 1974), Danish singer who has found success as a member of the pop group Toy-Box and as a solo artist under the name of Aneela
- Ardeshir Cowasjee (1926–2012): investigative journalist and newspaper columnist
- Ayesha Madon (born 10 February 1998): Australian actress and singer
- Bapsi Sidhwa (1938-2024): author and screenwriter; vocal proponent of women's rights
- Behram "Busybee" Contractor (1930–2001): journalist and columnist
- Behramji Malabari (1853–1912): poet, publicist, author, and social reformer
- Bejan Daruwalla (1931-2020): astrologer
- Burjor Khurshedji Karanjia (1919–2012): Indian film journalist and editor, chairman NFDC
- Cyrus Broacha (born 1971): MTV India VJ and stand-up comedian
- Cyrus Poncha (born 1976): Asian Squash Federation Junior Coach of the Year 2003–04
- Deena M. Mistri (1924–2011): author and educationalist; recipient of Pakistan's "Pride of Performance" medal
- Diana Eduljee (born 1956): first captain of the Indian women's Cricket team – from 1978 till 1993
- Diana Penty (born 1985): actress and model
- Dinyar Contractor (1941-2019): Parsi stage actor, Comedian and Bollywood actor
- Dolly Nazir (1935-2012): swimmer
- Erick Avari (born 1952): Hollywood actor.
- Farokh Engineer (born 1938): cricketer.
- Farrukh Dhondy (born 1944): novelist, short story writer, screenwriter, journalist.
- Li Gotami Govinda (born Ratti Petit, 1906 – 1988) Indian painter, photographer, writer and composer. (Converted to Tibetan Buddhism.)
- Firdaus Kanga (born 1960): author, actor and screenwriter.
- Freddie Mercury (Farrokh Bulsara, 1946–1991): rock musician and lead singer of Queen.
- Fredoon Kabraji (1897–1986): poet, writer, journalist, and artist writing in English.
- Gary Lawyer (born 1959): singer-songwriter
- Godrej Sidhwa (1925-2011): theologian and historian.
- Goshpi Avari (born 1967): first Pakistani woman to win a gold medal at the Asian Games.
- Homai Vyarawalla (1913–2012): India's first woman photojournalist, Padma Vibhushan.
- Homi Adajania (born 1972): Film Director, Writer and Scuba Diving Instructor
- Jamshedji Sorab Kukadaru (1831-1900): priest and ascetic
- Jehan Daruvala (born 1998): Indian racing driver.
- Jim Sarbh (born 1987): actor on film, stage and television.
- Jivanji Jamshedji Modi (1854-1933): Zoroastrian scholar, Ph.D from Heidelberg, Germany, recognition and awards, for scholarship, from Sweden, France, and Hungary.
- John Abraham (born 1972): Bollywood actor with a Parsi-Christian background
- Kaikhosru Shapurji Sorabji (1892–1988): composer, music critic, pianist, and writer.
- Kaizad Gustad (born 1968): film director.
- Karl Umrigar (1960–1979): Indian jockey
- Keki Daruwalla (1937-2024): poet and writer
- Maneckji Nusserwanji Dhalla (1875–1956): high priest and religious scholar.
- Mehli Mehta (1908–2002): musician; founder of the Bombay Philharmonic and Bombay String Orchestras.
- Mehr Jesia (born 1968): Indian model
- Nariman "Nari" Contractor (born 1934): cricketer; coach at the CCI Academy.
- Nauheed Cyrusi (born 1982): model, film actress, television presenter
- Nazneen Contractor (born 1982): film actress
- Nina Wadia (born 1968): British-Indian comedian and television actress, currently and most notably from EastEnders.
- Perizaad Zorabian (born 1973): model, film actress
- Persis Khambatta (1950–1998): actress and model. Miss India in 1965.
- Phiroz Mehta (1902–1994): writer on religious topics and philosopher.
- Pahlan Ratanji "Polly" Umrigar (1926–2006): cricketer.
- Rachel Viccaji Pakistani singer and musician.
- Rashid Byramji (1934-2022), Indian horse trainer
- Rohinton Mistry (born 1952): novelist, short story author, screenplay writer.
- Rustom Khurshedji Karanjia (1912–2008): journalist & editor, founder of India's first tabloid, Blitz.
- Sanaya Pithawalla (born 1993): actress, TV personality.
- Sam Dastor (born 1941): television actor and director.
- Shapur Kharegat (1932–2000): journalist, editor and director of The Economist (Asia).
- Shiamak Davar (born 1961): Bollywood choreographer
- Sohrab Modi (1897–1984): stage and film actor, director and producer.
- Sooni Taraporevala (born 1957): screenwriter, author and photographer.
- Tara Sutaria (born 1995): actress.
- Varun Toorkey (born 1990): television and film actor.
- Viraf Phiroz Patel (born 1980): The Grasim Mr. India 2005, model turned actor
- Zarin Mehta (born 1938): musician; executive director of the New York Philharmonic since 2000
- Zarnak Sidhwa (born 1972): Pakistani Chef with a TV show on Masala TV.
- Zerbanoo Gifford (born 1950): human rights campaigner
- Zoe Viccaji (born 1983): Pakistani singer and musician
- Zubin Mehta (born 1936): musician; Musical Director for Life of the Israel Philharmonic Orchestra and Maggio Musicale Fiorentino, former director of the Los Angeles Philharmonic, New York Philharmonic and Bavarian State Opera.
- Zubin Surkari (born 1980): Canadian international cricketer.
- Zubin Varla (born 1970): stage actor.

== Politicians, activists and bureaucrats ==
- B. P. Wadia (1881–1958), Indian theosophist and labour activist. Pioneered the creation of workers unions in India.
- Cowasji Jehangir (Readymoney) (1812–1878): J.P.; introduced income tax in India; first baronet of Bombay.
- Frene Ginwala (1932-2023): member of the ANC and aided Nelson Mandela in abolishing apartheid in South Africa. Later served for 7 years as Speaker Of the House of Parliament in South Africa
- Jamshed Nusserwanjee Mehta (1886–1952): former Mayor of Karachi for 12 consecutive years.
- Jamsheed Marker (1922–2018): Pakistani diplomat, ambassador to more countries than any other person; recipient of Hilal-i Imtiaz.
- Justice Dorab Patel (1924–1997): former Chief Justice of Sindh High Court, former Justice of Supreme Court of Pakistan and human rights campaigner.
- K. N. Choksy (1933–2015): Minister of Finance of Sri Lanka
- Mancherjee Bhownagree (1851–1933): politician, second Asian to be elected to the House of Commons (Conservative).
- Minocher Bhandara (1937–2008): Pakistani parliamentarian and owner of Muree Brewery.
- Minoo Masani (1905–1998): author, parliamentarian and a member of the Constituent Assembly.
- Piloo Mody (1926–1983): architect, parliamentarian, one of the founder-members of the Swatantra Party.
- Rustam S. Sidhwa (1927–1997): judge on the Supreme Court of Pakistan as well as one of the original eleven judges of the International Criminal Tribunal for the former Yugoslavia.
- Sanjay Gandhi (1946–1980): the younger son of Indira Gandhi and Feroz Gandhi, who followed his father's Parsi religion throughout his life.
- Shapurji Saklatvala (1874–1936): socialist, workers' welfare activist, third Asian to be elected to the House of Commons (Communist, Labour).
- Zerbanoo Gifford (born 1950): author and founder of the ASHA Centre made political history being elected as the first non-white woman for the Liberal Party in 1982.
- Kobad Ghandy (born 1951): communist ideologue, affiliated with the Communist Party of India (Maoist), political prisoner from 2009-2019.

== Indian independence movement ==
- Bhikaiji Cama (1861–1936): political activist, co-creator of the Indian nationalist flag.
- Dadabhai Naoroji (1825–1917): economist, political activist, first Asian to be elected to the House of Commons of the United Kingdom (Liberal), first to publicly demand independence for India.
- Feroze Gandhi (1912–1960): journalist and politician; Indian MP under his father-in-law Jawaharlal Nehru; husband of Indira Gandhi, father of Rajiv Gandhi and Sanjay Gandhi, and grandfather of Rahul, Priyanka and Varun Gandhi.
- Khurshed Framji Nariman (1883–1948): social activist, Mayor of Bombay. Member of the Indian National Congress.
- Pherozeshah Mehta, Sir (1845–1915): political activist, co-founder and a President of the Indian National Congress, founder of the Bombay Municipal Corporation

== Law ==
- Cornelia Sorabji (1866–1954): first female graduate of Bombay University, first female to read law at Oxford University and first woman to practice law in India and Britain
- Dinshah Fardunji Mulla (1868-1934): Indian author of legal reference books, appointed a Privy Counsellor in 1930, assistant editor of Pollock’s Commentaries on Indian Contract Act
- Mithan Jamshed Lam (1898-1981): First female Indian lawyer to practice law in the Bombay High Court, first female Sheriff of Bombay, and noted women's rights activist.
- Karl Jamshed Khandalavala (1904–1995): the defence lawyer of KM Nanavati in the case of K. M. Nanavati v. State of Maharashtra
- Hormasji Maneckji Seervai (1906–1996): eminent Indian jurist
- Avabai Bomanji Wadia (1913-2005): First female lawyer from Ceylon (now Sri Lanka) to pass the bar exam and practice law in England, notable social worker, and founder of International Planned Parenthood Federation and the Family Planning Association of India.
- Nanabhoy ("Nani") Palkhivala (1920–2002): prominent jurist and economist
- Fali Sam Nariman (1929-2024): jurist, recipient of the Padma Bhushan and Padma Vibhushan
- Soli Jehangir Sorabjee (1930-2021): former Attorney-General of India
- T. R. Andhyarujina (1933–2017): senior advocate
- Sam Piroj Bharucha (born 1937): 30th Chief Justice of India
- S. H. Kapadia (1947–2016): 38th Chief Justice of India
- Rohinton Fali Nariman (born 1956): Judge, Supreme Court of India; Delhi University; Harvard University
- Shiavax Jal Vazifdar (born 1956): Chief Justice, Punjab and Haryana High Court
- Jamshed Burjor Pardiwala (born 1965): judge of the Supreme Court of India since May 2022. He was part of the majority of the Constitution bench which upheld the 103rd Constitutional amendment of Economically Weaker Sections (EWS) reservation, which is considered a major breakthrough.
- Neomi Rao (born 1973): circuit judge of United States Court of Appeals for the District of Columbia Circuit, former Administrator of the Office of Information and Regulatory Affairs (converted to Judaism)

== Others ==
- Bhicaji Balsara (1872–1962): Among the first Indians to become a naturalized US Citizen, in 1909
- Bukhtyar Rustomji (1899–1936): Mumbai-born Lancaster doctor executed for murdering his wife and a maid
- Dossabhoy Muncherji Raja (1873–1947): first Indian to be appointed appraiser of precious stones to British Indian customs. Awarded the title of Khan Sahib
- Lady Frainy Dhunjibhoy Bomanji (14 September 1893 – 1986): Lady Harrogate, philanthropist, Honorary Freemanship of the Borough in 1984
- Jimmy Bharucha (died 2005): Sri Lankan broadcaster
- Keiki R. Mehta (1971–present) Indian ophthalmologist and Padma Shri awardee
- Rattanbai Petit (1900–1929): second wife of Muhammad Ali Jinnah
- Jehangir Hormasji Kothari (1857–1934): philanthropist and world traveller.

== In arts ==
- Firoz Dastur (1919-2008): Kirana Gharana vocalist
- Fredoon Kabraji (1897–1986): poet
- Hormazd Narielwalla (born 1979): collage artist and author, based in London
- Jehangir Sabavala (1922–2011): painter
- Karl Keki Singporewala (born 1983): architect & sculptor
- Shirin Darasha (1938–2012): playwright

== Fictional characters ==
- The Cake "Parsee" (colloquial British spelling of Parsi) in "How the Rhinoceros Got His Skin", a chapter in Rudyard Kipling's Just So Stories. Kipling names him as Pestonjee Bomonjee in the illustration accompanying the story.

== See also ==
- Irani
- List of Zoroastrians
