= Aban Marker Kabraji =

Pakistani scientist (born 1953)

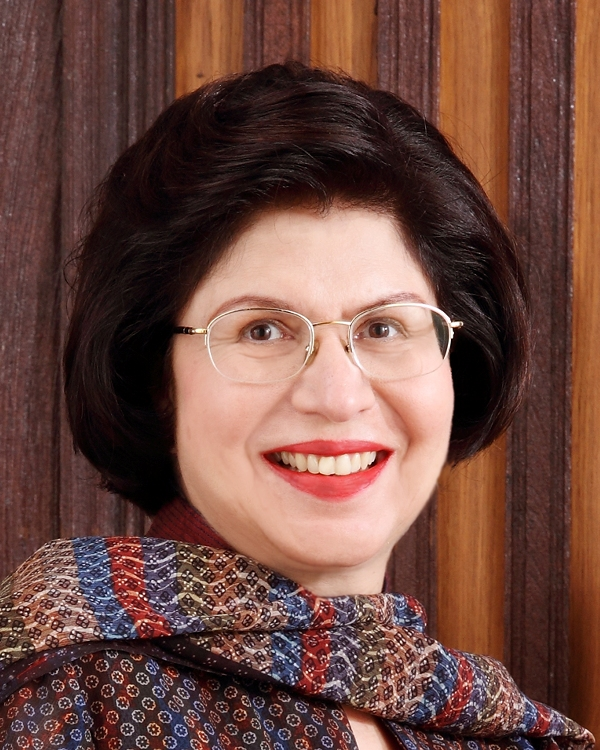
- Born: March 12, 1953; Mumbai, India
- Education: University of London, Karachi University
- Occupations: Regional Director Asia Regional Office, IUCN, International Union for Conservation of Nature
- Scientific career
- Fields: Biology
- Workplaces: International Union for Conservation of Nature (IUCN)

Aban Marker Kabraji (born 12 March 1953 in Bombay (now Mumbai), India), is a Pakistani biologist and scientist of Parsi origin. She was regional director of the Asia Regional Office of the International Union for Conservation of Nature (IUSN), until early 2021 when she retired from her position. Previously, she was country representative for the IUCN Pakistan office.

== Family ==
She is the eldest of three children, and a niece of Pakistani diplomat Jamsheed Marker.

== Work ==
Kabraji provided strategic leadership for the Asia Regional Office of the IUCN in Bangkok, Thailand from 1998 to 2021. This included oversight of 11 country offices with nearly 300 staff and some 70 environmental initiatives. Kabraji was with IUCN since 1988, when she joined the Pakistan office as country representative. Since then she has amassed extensive experience negotiating with governments, IUCN members and partners to support implementation of major global conventions such as Convention on Biological Diversity, Ramsar and CITES.

Kabraji co-chairs the IUCN-UNDP regional initiative Mangroves for the Future and is the nominated chair of TRAFFIC, a wildlife trade monitoring network. She has also co-chaired the advisory committee for Ecosystems for Life, a Bangladesh-India water dialogue programme. Kabraji has been a member of the External Advisory Board for the Yale Global Institute of Sustainable Forestry and the Governing Board for the International Institute for Sustainable Development. Kabraji is a McCluskey fellow and visiting professor at the Yale School of Forestry and Environmental Studies and a member of the Advisory Committee of the United Nations Centre for Regional Development.

Earlier in her career, Kabraji was involved in the conservation of the endangered green turtle population off the coast of Karachi and Baluchistan. She was the first author of a paper published in 1984 about the conservation of the green sea turtle Chelonia mydas population nesting on beaches Hawkes Bay and Sandspit, south-west of Karachi in Pakistan.

== Publications ==
- Kabraji, A. M. and F. Firdous. 1984. Conservation of turtles, Hawkes Bay and Sandspit, Pakistan. Project Report. WWF and Sind Wildlife Management Board.

== See also ==
- List of Parsis
