= Godrej Sidhwa =

Ervad Godrej Sidhwa (1925 – 4 June 2011) was born in Karachi, Pakistan, and studied the Avesta, Pahalvi, Persian, & Pazend languages, as well as Ancient Iranian literature at M.F. Cama Athornan Institute, Andheri, Mumbai, for six years. He was initiated into the Zoroastrian priesthood by going through the Navar and Maratab initiation ceremony from Iranshah Atash Behram, Udvada, India. His initiation as a priest accounts for the "Ervad" ('Reverend') title.

Sidhwa was the instructor of Zoroastrianism and Ancient Iranian History at the B.V.S. Parsi High School and Mama Parsi Secondary School, Karachi, from the early 1960s until his death. He was appointed as the Honorary Lecturer in Zoroastrian Theology at colleges in Karachi for the Zoroastrian students. He was also appointed as Examiner in Zoroastrian Theology by the University of Karachi, Pakistan, for the bachelor's degree program. After the death of Dasturji Dr. M. N. Dhalla he took up all of the Dasturji's duties in the religious as well as the social areas.

Sidhwa lectured on Zoroastrian Theology in India, Pakistan, Iran, Canada, Britain, the United States, and the United Arab Emirates. He also lectured on Zoroastrianism at the University of California, Berkeley. On several occasions he has been invited by the Government of Pakistan to discuss the Human Rights and problems faced by religious minorities in Pakistan. He was the Honorary Secretary of The Karachi Parsi Anjuman Trust Fund, Karachi Athornan Mandal, and Joint Honorary Secretary of Dr. Dhalla Memorial Institute since its inception in 1965. He was also a jury delegate of Karachi Parsi Matrimonial Court, Government of Sindh, Pakistan, from 1960 until his death.
