= Keiki R. Mehta =

Indian ophthalmologist, medical researcher and writer

- Born: 1941 (age 84–85); Maharashtra, India
- Occupation: Ophthalmologist
- Known for: Phacoemulsification; Radial Keratotomy
- Awards: Padma Shri; Grand Honors Award; Triple Ribbon Award; Legion d' Honor - Instituto Barraquer; Lim International Award
- Website: Website

Keiki R. Mehta, an Indian ophthalmologist, medical researcher and writer, is considered by many as the father of Phacoemulsification in India. He is the Chief Surgical and Medical Director at Mehta International Eye Institute, a Mumbai-based specialty eye hospital founded by him. He is known to be the first surgeon to perform a Radial keratotomy in India and is credited with the development of the first soft eye implant in the world, and the Keiki Mehta BP Valve Glaucoma Shunt, a medical implant used in the treatment of neovascular‚ congenital and uveitic glaucoma. He is a recipient of several honours including the Grand Honors Award of the National Eye Research Foundation, Chicago and the Triple Ribbon Award of the American Society for Cataract and Refractive Surgery. The Government of India awarded him the fourth highest civilian honour of the Padma Shri, in 2008, for his contributions to Medicine.

== Biography ==
Born in a Parsi family in the western Indian state of Maharashtra, Mehta graduated in medicine (MBBS) from the Christian Medical College and secured his post graduate degree (MS) from the Post Graduate Institute of Medical Education and Research, Chandigarh. Moving to UK, he obtained a Diploma in Ophthalmology (DO) from the Moorefield's Eye Hospitals and Institute of Ophthalmology, London where he had the opportunity to train under renowned ophthalmologist, Harold Ridley, and secured another Diploma from Dublin, before going to US for advanced training. He returned to India in 1971 and started working on intraocular lenses (IOL) which was not available in India at that time. He founded Colaba Eye Hospital where he introduced the posterior chamber implant and started working on the development of a soft implant in 1976. The efforts resulted in the presentation of a paper at the All India Ophthalmological Society in 1977 and subsequently at the American Intra-ocular Implant Society, San Francisco in 1978. He also developed a round intraocular lens, a first time in India, which was surgically implanted in 1983. Keiki Mehta BP Valve Glaucoma Shunt is another of his inventions, which is a valved implant used in the treatment of glaucoma.

Later, Mehta's focus shifted to Refractive surgery and did pioneering work on Radial Keratotomy and Excimer surgery. He wrote a book, Radial Keratotomy Principle & Practice, in 1990 which is a reference text on the subject. When Optikon, an Italian manufacturer of ophthalmological equipment, toured India with a Phacoemulsification machine for promotional purposes, Mehta bought the equipment from them and visited USA to receive training on phacoemulsification under William F. Maloney in 1988. His researches with the equipment resulted in the development of new techniques including vertical lens rotation, a tangential chop technique, and lens coring. In 2000, he founded Mehta International Eye Institute, attached to the Colaba Eye Hospital, for advanced research on ophthalmology, which has since been awarded the Big Brand Research Service Excellence Award for the Best Eye Hospital in Mumbai in 2011. He also established Netra Rukshak Rural Eye Hospital, a charity hospital in Karjat, a small village with tribal people as majority population. Besides the text book on Keratotomy, he is also the co-author of The Art of Phacoemulsification, a descriptive text and reference manual on phacoemulsification.

== Positions and honours ==
Keiki Mehta, a consultant and head of the department of ophthalmology at Breach Candy Hospital, is the honorary ophthalmologist to the Governor of Maharashtra, besides holding the position of honorary ophthalmologist to the Armed Forces of India and Maharashtra Police. He has served as the President of the All India Ophthalmologists Association and the Intraocular Implant and Refractive Society and is the chairman of Eye Advance Congress, an annual event started in 1996. He is a visiting faculty at ONO Clinique del'Oeil Eye Institute, Geneva and at St. Luke's Institute, Texas and has trained several ophthalmologists in his career. He is member of the Vision International Presbyopia Club and the Royal Society for the Promotion of Health (UK) and holds the Legion d' Honor of the Instituto Barraquer, Barcelona, the only Indian to receive the honour.

Mehta has delivered several award orations; Siva Reddy Gold Medal and Oration of the Hyderabad Ophthalmic Society, Mayurilal Gold Medal and Oration of the Madras Ophthalmic Society, Gold Medal and Oration of the Intraocular Implant Society, Dr. Vinod Arora Oration Award of the Uttarakhand State Ophthalmological Society and Prof B. S. Pendse Memorial Lecture and Oration of Indian Medical Association, Mumbai are some of them. The Art of Organizing and Executing Successful International Conferences was a presentation he did at the India Convention Promotion Bureau in Hyderabad in 2009. He performed a live Presby LASIK surgery demonstration at "ConFluence - 2010" at Bengaluru and a live surgery demonstration at Video Cataracta in Milan, Italy. He has received several Gold Medals such as Rajiv Gandhi Gold Medal (1991), Prof. C. H. Reshmi Gold Medal (1994), Eye Research Foundation Gold Medal, (1995) and T. Agarwal Gold Medal (2001) and the International Academy of Ophthalmology Gold Medal (2004) and Indian awards such as Ravi Bhandare Award, Contact Lens Society Appreciation Award, Om Prakash Award, North Zone Ophthalmological Society Achievement Award, and Pan Ophthalmological Award. He has received Lifetime Achievement Awards from the Zoroastrian's Children Foundation (2010), Bombay Parsee Association (2010) and Vidarbha Ophthalmological Society (2010).

Mehta was the first Indian to receive the Grand Honors Award of the National Eye Research Foundation, Chicago. Asia Pacific Intraocular Implant Association awarded him the Lim International Award in 1997 and American Society for Cataract and Refractive Surgery, USA honoured him with the Triple Ribbon Award in 1998. The Government of India awarded him the civilian honour of the Padma Shri in 2008 and Inter-Novation Inc. listed him among the Top Docs in the field of ophthalmology in 2011. He is also a recipient of the Outstanding Recognition Award of the International Council of Cataract Surgeons (2001) and the Lifetime Achievement Award of the Medical Integration Council and the West German Chemtec Foundation.

== Bibliography ==
- Keiki R. Mehta (1990). Radial Keratotomy Principle & Practice. JayPee Publishers. ISBN 9788171791347.
- Alpar John J, Mehta Keiki R (2001). The Art of Phacoemulsification. JayPee Medical Publishers. p. 553. ISBN 9788171797905.

== See also ==
- Radial Keratotomy
- Phacoemulsification
- List of Parsis
- Newton K. Wesley
