= Deena M. Mistri =

Pakistani educator

Deena M. Mistri (21 May 1925 – 27 January 2011) was an educator from Pakistan.

== Early life and education ==
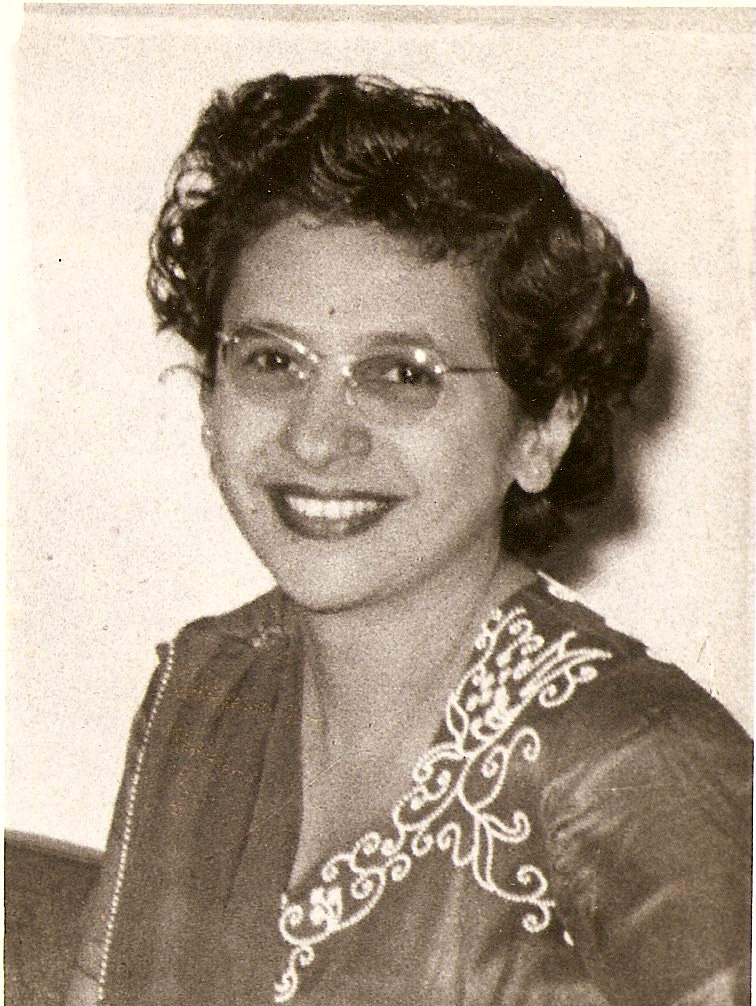
Mistri in 1950

Mistri was a member of the Parsi or Zoroastrian community. She was born in Hyderabad, Sindh, on 21 May 1925, to Dhunmai and Seth Pestonjee Jamshedji Soparivala.

She married the architect Minoo Mistri in 1949. They were married for 57 years. Her husband died in 2006. Mistri received her Bachelor of Arts from the D.J. College in Karachi, now known as D.J. Sindh Government Science College. In those days, since Sindh was a part of the Bombay Presidency, the degree was formally awarded by Bombay University in 1945, and then she received her BEd with Honors in 1958 from the Government Teachers' Training College in Karachi.

== Career ==
Deena Mistri started teaching English to the secondary classes in 1951. She became the principal of the Bai Virbaijee Soparivala Parsi High School in 1972 and then served in that position for many years – the same school that was founded by her great-grandfather Seth Shapurji Hormusji Soparivala in 1859.

It was after completing her B.A. degree that she started visiting the B. V. S. Parsi High School and helping students with elocution competitions and started tutoring English to those that needed extra help. She took partial retirement from this school with a warm send-off party in 2004. Then she was employed at two other schools from 2004 to 2011.

She once told a major newspaper of Pakistan, "I think I was always a born teacher... I would take the servants' children and teach them the a, b, c".

At the time of her death, Mistri was Chairperson of Westminster School and College, Karachi.

== Awards ==
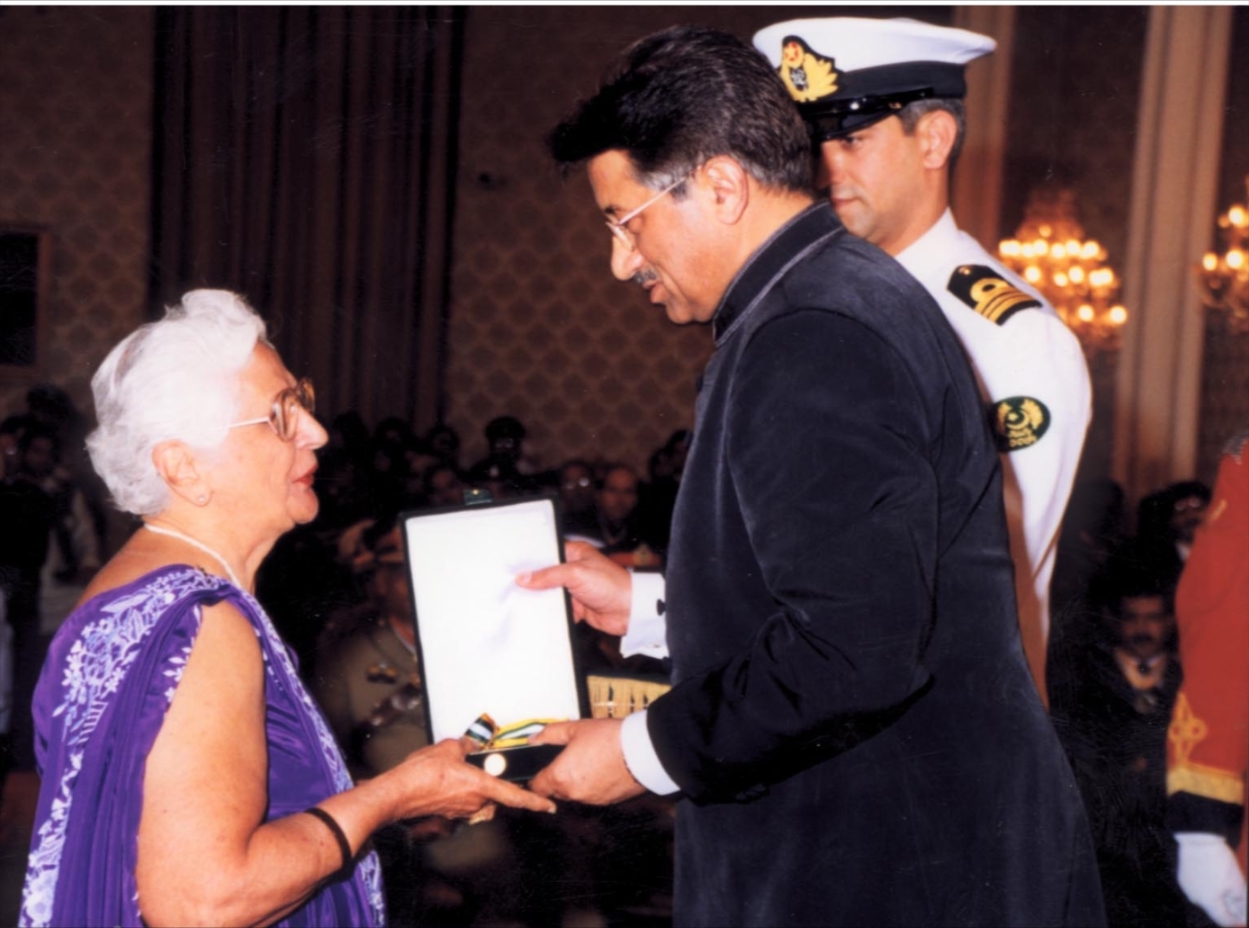
Pride of Performance by President Musharraf

She was awarded the Pride of Performance by the President of Pakistan – General Pervez Musharraf on 23 March 2002 for her contributions towards providing quality education in Pakistan for over 60 years.

She was awarded a Fulbright Scholarship from the US in 1962, where she completed her Diploma in Education. In America, she taught at the University of Athens in Ohio and at the University of Texas at Austin as a visiting professor.

She was given Honorary Citizenship to Texas by Governor Price Daniel in 1962 for teaching at a local high school in Austin, Texas, and as a visiting professor at the University of Texas at Austin.

== Death ==
Mistri died on 27 January 2011 at age 85 as a result of a brain infarction. In 1992, she was diagnosed with breast cancer and underwent a mastectomy and had recovered. She is survived by her two sons. Her funeral was held on 29 January in Karachi, with over 2,000 attending her funeral to pay their last respects.
