= Gary Lawyer =

Indian singer-songwriter (born 1959)

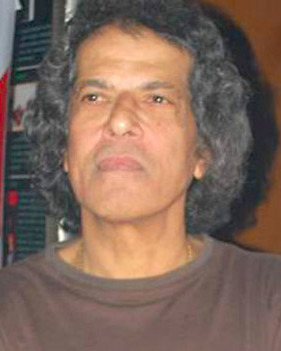
- Gary Lawyer From The Sophie

Background information
- Origin: Mumbai, India
- Genres: Pop, blues, jazz
- Occupations: Instrumentalist, singer-songwriter
- Instruments: vocals, guitar
- Years active: Since the 1980s
- Website: garylawyermusic.com

Gary Lawyer (born 1959) is an Indian singer-songwriter known for his works predominantly in Western music and Bollywood. He started his career as a nightclub singer in New York City. He is also known in India as "The man with a golden voice".

== Career ==
He is the first Indian to be signed for a western album outside India and the first English music video "Nights on Fire" to be played on MTV in India. Lawyer has a bass baritone, who sings in the tenor range. During his youth he studied music in New York City, before returning to his roots in Bombay to further build his career, leaving behind the many contracts he was offered in New York.

Today he is known in India as "the man with a golden voice". As well as music from his own albums he also sings covers by rock and jazz musicians such as The Doors, Frank Sinatra, Elvis Presley, Freddie Mercury and many more. He has been the opening act for many international musicians such as Bon Jovi, Bryan Adams, Def Leppard, and has played tributes to Queen by playing for Freddie Mercury's family and friends.

Lawyer also has broadened his horizons and sung for Bollywood films which have gone on to become hits.

== Discography ==
=== Songs ===
- "Arrow in the Dust"
- "Highway to Heaven"
- "Nights on Fire"
- "This Cannot Wait"
- "The Other Side of Dawn"
- "Deep Blue Dusk"
- "Indian Summer"

=== Albums ===
- This Cannot Wait (1987)
- High Standards (1990)
- The Other Side of Dawn (1992)
- Arrow in the Dust (1996)
- Unbelong (2004)

== Selected filmography ==
(vocals)

- Jahan Tum Le Chalo (1999) – "Your Face Is Face Of Love"
- Road (2002) – "Road ke har Mod Pe"
- Corporate (2006) – "Yahan Sabko Sab"
- Sacred Evil – A True Story (2006) – "Deep Blue Dusk"

== See also ==
- List of blues musicians
- List of Indians
- List of jazz musicians
- List of people from New York City
- List of singer-songwriters
