= Bhicaji Balsara =

One of the first Indians to become a naturalized US citizen (1872–1962)

Bhicaji Framji Balsara (often misrendered as Bhicaji Franyi Balsara; May 30, 1872 – 1962) was an Indian immigrant to the United States, notable for being amongst the first Indians to become a naturalized US citizen.

Balsara was a Parsi Zoroastrian from Bombay. He arrived in the United States in 1900, as a cotton buyer for the Tata Group and both settled and married in New York. He applied for citizenship in 1906 but was granted the status only in 1909 after he fought his case before two courts, the Circuit Court in New York and the Federal Court of Appeal. This is as the initial presiding judge, Emile Henry Lacombe in the Circuit Court only reluctantly conferred American citizenship on Balsara, as he reasoned that there "was much force in the argument that the Congress which framed the original act for naturalization of aliens... intended it to include only white persons belonging to the races whose emigrants had contributed to the building up on this continent of the community of people which declared itself a new nation...." Lacombe, however, conceded that Balsara "appears to be a gentleman of high character and exceptional intelligence."

Lacombe only gave Balsara citizenship on the hope that the United States Attorney would indeed challenge his decision and appeal it to create "an authoritative interpretation" of the law.

He was aided in his appeal by the minuscule Syrian American community in New York, seeking to use his case as a precedent for their own naturalization attempts.

Balsara married Louise Darre, and they had two daughters together.

== See also ==
- Indians in the New York City metropolitan area
- Racial classification of Indian Americans
- United States v. Bhagat Singh Thind
