= Hormazd Narielwalla =

British collage artist and author

- Born: 1979 (age 46–47); Mumbai, India
- Education: University of Wales, Newport; University of Westminster; London College of Fashion
- Website: www.narielwalla.com

Hormazd Narielwalla (born 1979) is an Indian-born British collage artist and author based in London.

== Early life and education ==
Born in Mumbai to a Parsi family, Narielwalla moved to Britain in the 2000s. Narielwalla graduated with a Bachelor of Arts (BA) in Fashion Design from Newport University in 2006 and a Master of Arts (MA) from the University of Westminster in 2007. He obtained a PhD at the London College of Fashion in 2014.

Narielwalla is gay.

== Style ==
He has pioneered artwork that portrays abstract body forms and abstract designs by collages on discarded tailoring patterns of deceased clients of Savile Row tailors or on patterns obtained from archaic or contemporary tailors of the same genre. has had his work exhibited in several cities and placed in the collections of art libraries and fashion institutes across the world. During his tenure at the Savile Row tailoring firm of Dege & Skinner, he noticed tailoring patterns of dead clients were destroyed as serving no further use. Narielwalla decided to collect these and infuse new life on these patterns, creating abstract art in an entirely new genre-a process of finding radical abstraction by collages on antique tailoring patters.

In their issue of 22 October 2015, Aesthetica Magazine describes Hormazd's artwork as new interpretation of tailoring patterns, as interesting abstract drawings of the human form and ahead of their time, anthropomorphic in origin and beautifully abstract in isolation.

== Notable work ==
The Crafts Council had commissioned his work for a national touring exhibit- Block Party (2011). Besides London, his work has been exhibited in Melbourne, Stockholm, Athens, and the Scope Art Fair, New York City and at the India Art Fair in New Delhi.

In a competition "The Saatchi Showdown Body Electric Show" held in 2014, Narielwalla's work was placed first from amongst several participants.

Narielwalla was Artist in Residence for Frieze 2014 at the Hyatt Regency Hotel, the Churchill, London. The studio for onsite work was set up in the lobby of the hotel for the Frieze Week; guests and visitors were able to view him working on creating artwork on a copy of Sir Winston Churchill's suit patterns, provided from the archives of Henry Poole and Co.

In October 2015, an exhibition, featuring 8 of his works, opens at the Fashion Museum, Bath and will go on from 24 October 2015 to 3 January 2016.

Collages by Hormazd, along with artwork by Stuart Semple Rob Ball, Dan Dickson and some others form the stage setting for Oscar-winning director Danny Boyle play, The Children's Monologues to be presented at the Royal Court Theater for its 2015 Anniversary Gala.

== Awards and recognition ==
In 2016 Narielwalla won the Paupers Press Prize at the International Print Biennale with his work God Save The Queen. The printing press released a pair of lithographs which were first shown the following year at the Royal Academy of Arts during London Original Print Fair. The pair of prints are now held in the V&A's permanent collection of Works On Paper.

In March 2015, Vogue magazine wrote: If fashion is art? this can be debated, but Narielwalla creates artwork on tailoring and sewing patterns that has drawn the attention of collectors and critics.

== Publications ==
Narielwalla has published three books:-

- Dead Man's Patterns. Amazon.com in a review of his work on their website, describes this book as a Limited Edition Artist book, and a design story inspired by bespoke patterns belonging to deceased clients of Savile Row Tailors. The book has been acquired by collectors including the Rare British Modern Collection at the British Library.
- The Savile Row Cutter (ISBN 978-1-903071-33-5) a fascinating biography of Master Cutter, and Chairman of the Savile Row tailors, Dege and Skinner, Michael Skinner (Bene Factum Publishing Limited)
- Sylph Editions have published Narielwalla's third book, Paper Dolls, "a deliciously visual illustrated book" with page cut outs showcasing some of his works, his eye catching illustrations on himself as a Japanese Geisha, this book is in three editions, one a trade edition, the others a special edition and also as a beautiful collector's item.
