= Jehangir Ghandy =

Indian businessman

Sir Jehangir Ghandy
- Occupation: Businessman
- Awards: Padma Bhushan

Sir Jehangir Ghandy CIE, Assoc. CStJ (18 November 1896 – 17 April 1972) was an Indian businessperson who is credited with building Tata Steel at Jamshedpur. He was awarded Padma Bhushan in 1958. Invested as a Companion of the Order of the Indian Empire (CIE) in 1941, he was Knighted in 1945. He was made an Honorary Lt. Col. in the Territorial Army in 1952 and an Honorary colonel in April 1957. In 1964, Columbia University conferred on him the Honorary Degree of Doctor of Laws on the occasion of the 50th anniversary of the Graduate School of Business.
