= Cyrus Addie Pithawalla =

Indian Army officer

Major General C A Pithawalla AC, VSM
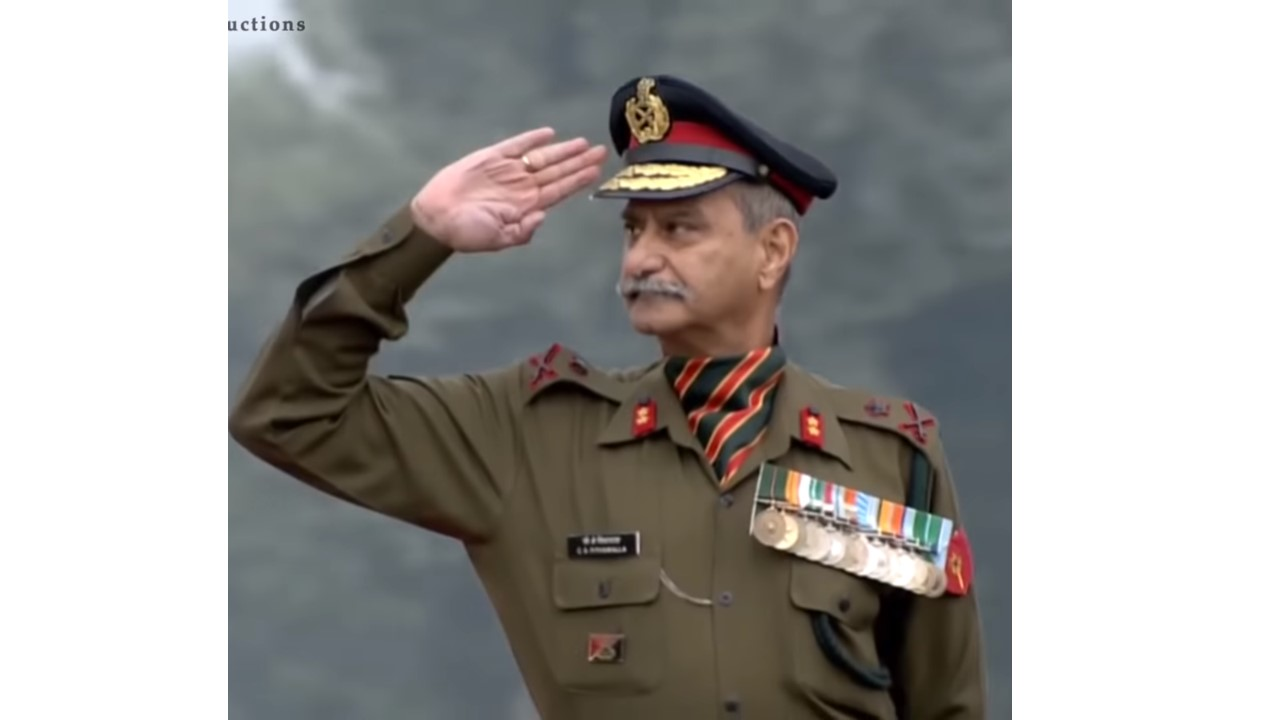
- Major General Cyrus Pithawalla at Rajpath saluting the President during Republic Day Parade.
- Born: 13 January 1957 (age 69); Bangalore, Mysore State, India (now Bengaluru, Karnataka)
- Education: Delhi University (B.Com.); Delhi University (M.Com); Officers Training Academy; The Air Force School
- Spouse: Farida Pithawalla
- Relatives: Addie Pithawalla (Father); Sheru Pithawalla (Mother)
- Military career
- Allegiance: India
- Branch: Indian Army
- Service years: 1979 – 2015
- Rank: Major General
- Service number: SS-30122 (short-service commission); IC-37593 (regular commission)
- Unit: 17 Jammu and Kashmir Rifles
- Commands: Rashtriya Rifles; Andhra Sub-Area
- Awards: Ashok Chakra; Vishisht Seva Medal

Major General Cyrus Addie Pithawalla AC, VSM, is a former General officer of the Indian Army. He was awarded India's highest peacetime decoration for gallantry, the Ashok Chakra, in 1981, and by virtue of this is one of the most decorated flag officers in the history of the Indian Armed Forces (the Ashoka Chakra ranks above all other Indian decorations excepting the Param Vir Chakra, its wartime equivalent, and the Bharat Ratna).

== Early life and education ==
Pithawalla was born in Bengaluru on 13 January 1957 and was educated at the Air Force School, Delhi. He subsequently attended the Delhi University. After graduating with degrees in commerce, he joined the Officers Training Academy, Chennai.

== Career ==
Pithawalla was commissioned as a Second Lieutenant on a short-service commission into the 17th battalion, Jammu and Kashmir Rifles on 1 September 1979. On 1 September 1984, he received a regular commission as a lieutenant.

On 1 August 2008, Pithawalla became the first recipient of either the Param Vir Chakra or the Ashoka Chakra to attain the one-star rank of Brigadier. Upon promotion to the rank of Major General on 20 January 2013, he became the first Ashoka Chakra recipient to attain the rank of a general officer in a Two-star rank. As a major general, he was posted as the General Officer Commanding (GOC) Andhra Sub Area.

In his 35-year career, he held various instructional, staff and command positions across India. In addition to this, he served as a Military observer in Cambodia as part of the United Nations Transitional Authority in Cambodia mission. He also served as the Deputy Commander of an Infantry Brigade Group in the UN Mission at the Democratic Republic of Congo.

== Ashoka Chakra ==
Pithawalla was awarded the Ashok Chakra in 1981 for a counter-insurgency operation in Manipur. His Ashok Chakra Citation reads as follows:

CITATION
SECOND LIEUTENANT CYRUS ADDIE PITHAWALLA

On 6th July, 1981, 2/Lt Cyrus Addie Pithwalla while in command of a Company Column of 17 JAK Rifles was ordered to cordon and search area Tekcham in Manipur and to capture insurgents reported to be there.

2/Lt Pithawalla led his men through marshy and difficult terrain for over seven kilometres. When he was about 200 metres from the Tekcham Hill, he drew fire from the militants there. With total disregard to his personal safety, the officer charged on the militants with lightning speed. When he was just 50 metres short of the area, he found an militant trying to escape. Although, he could have shot the individual dead, he decided to capture him alive. While nearing the fleeing militant, 2/Lt Pithawalla was wounded in the right shoulder by a gun shot.

Despite his serious injury, he personally led the charge and captured the militant who turned out to be one Bisheshwar Singh, the top-most leader of the PLA. In spite of his serious condition, he refused to be evacuated and led his men in a combing operation till 6.00 a.m. the next morning. These operations resulted in the death of seven militants and capture of a very large quantity of arms and ammunition. 2/Lt Cyrus Addie Pithawalla thus displayed bravery of the highest order and extraordinary and inspiring leadership and was awarded the Ashok Chakra.

== Awards and decorations ==

Ashok Chakra	Vishisht Seva Medal	Wound Medal	Samanya Seva Medal
Special Service Medal	Operation Vijay Medal	Operation Parakram Medal	Sainya Seva Medal
High Altitude Service Medal	Videsh Seva Medal	50th Anniversary of Independence Medal	30 Years Long Service Medal
20 Years Long Service Medal	9 Years Long Service Medal	UN Mission in Cambodia	UN Mission in Congo

== Dates of rank ==
Insignia	Rank	Component	Date of rank
	Second Lieutenant	Indian Army	1 September 1979 (short-service commission); 1 September 1984 (regular commission, with seniority from 30 April 1980 but for increments of pay from 1 September 1979)
	Lieutenant	Indian Army	1 September 1981 (short-service commission); 1 September 1984 (regular commission, with seniority from 30 April 1982)
	Captain	Indian Army	30 April 1985
	Major	Indian Army	30 April 1991
	Lieutenant-Colonel	Indian Army	31 December 2002
	Colonel	Indian Army	1 February 2005
	Brigadier	Indian Army	1 August 2008 (seniority from 4 January 2008)
	Major General	Indian Army	20 January 2013 (seniority from 2 April 2011)
