= Cowasjee Dinshaw Adenwalla =

Indian trader

The name of the company as it appears today at the entrance of a hotel in Zanzibar

Cowasjee Shavaksha Dinshaw Adenwalla CIE (1827–1900) was a trader who emigrated from Surat/Bombay. The family name Adenwalla ("from Aden") was a later addition, and is the name by which he is today remembered.

Cowasjee travelled extensively and set up trading posts in other British possessions/protectorates, most notably on the east-African coast in Zanzibar and Mombasa. He was however best known for his business acumen, and the foresight that Aden would become an important port within the framework of the (modern-day) Suez Canal. He had an entire floating dock shipped from Britain in 1895 and was known locally as "Dinshaw Pontoon".

Although of the Zoroastrian faith (and founder of the Fire Temple in Aden), he financed the construction of a mosque for the local Muslim population, which is known as Cowasji Masjid after him.
