= Fredoon Kabraji =

Indian poet, writer and journalist

Fredoon Jehangir Kabraji
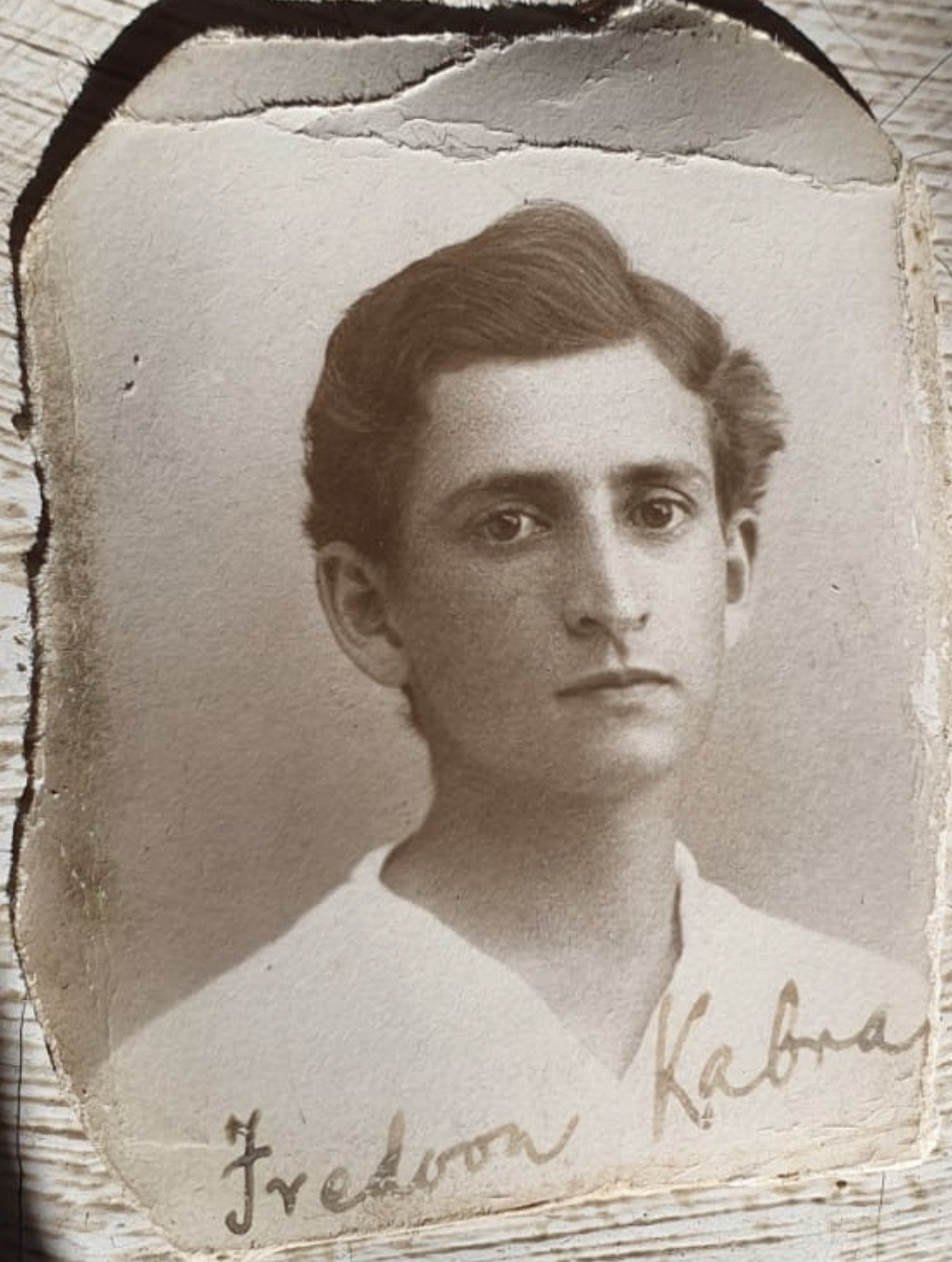
- Kabraji in 1918, aged 21
- Born: 10 February 1897; India
- Died: 1986 (aged 88–89); England
- Occupations: Poet, writer, journalist, and artist
- Spouse: Eleanor M. Wilkinson
- Children: 3
- Writing career
- Pen name: Fredoon Kabraji

Fredoon Kabraji (Gujarati: ફરીદૂન કબીરજી; 10 February 1897 – 1986) was an Indian poet, writer, journalist, and artist of Parsi descent.

== Life and work ==
Fredoon Jehangir Kabraji was a Parsi born in India on 10 February 1897. His father was Jehangir Kabraji, an Indian civil servant, and his mother was Putlibai.

Initially, his parents wanted him to pursue a career in farming, but growing tired of this, he moved to Britain perhaps around the mid-1920s, and married Eleanor M. Wilkinson there in 1926.

Kabraji studied at the University of London, but failing to secure a degree, he became a self-confessed "drifter, trying his hand at art, journalism and poetry". As well as having his poetry published, he also contributed to periodicals such as New Statesman and Nation and Life and Letters Today, and journals including The Political Quarterly.

Kabraji and his wife went back to India where they had two sons, and a daughter, Cynthia (Kashfi). The family returned to Britain in 1935, not long before the outbreak of World War II. Their daughter Cynthia later married the Afghan writer and thinker Idries Shah, an associate and friend of the poet Robert Graves. Shah's father, Ikbal Ali Shah published two of Kabraji's poems, "The Lovers" and "Tulip", in his 1933 work The Oriental Caravan: A Revelation of the Soul and Mind of Asia.

According to letters archived at St John's College Library, University of Oxford, Kabraji corresponded with Robert Graves and first met him in 1925. Archives at the University of Victoria and California Digital Library also confirm later correspondence with poets John Betjeman and Walter de la Mare.

=== Politics ===
Kabraji spoke out against British colonialism and poverty in India, and he supported Mahatma Gandhi's non-violent protest and the Quit India Movement, which demanded an end to British rule in India.

=== Offices ===
Kabraji was listed among the Vice-Presidents and Representatives of the colonial branches of the Empire Poetry League, under Bombay. The League was founded in 1917 and was operational for around 15 years.

== Works ==
=== Books ===
- Sett, Adi K. (1940). Kabraji, Fredoon (ed.). Rain in My Heart: Forty Poems. London: Fortune Press.
- Fredoon Kabraji (1944). A Minor Georgian's Swan Song (Fifty-One Poems). London: Fortune Press.
- Fredoon Kabraji (ed.) (1947). This Strange Adventure: An Anthology of Poems in English by Indians, 1828–1946. London: New India Publishing Co.
- Fredoon Kabraji (1956). The Cold Flame: Poems (1922–1924, 1935–1938, 1946–1953). London: Fortune Press.

=== Contributions to books and anthologies ===
- Cranmer-Byng, L.; Kapadia, Dr. S. A., eds. (1927). Anthology of Modern Indian Poetry. London: John Murray: The Wisdom of the East Series.
- Campbell, Kathleen Winifred, ed. (1930). An Anthology of English Poetry: Dryden to Blake. New York: Henry Holt and Company.
- Ali Shah, Sirdar Ikbal, ed. (1933). The Oriental Caravan: A Revelation of the Soul and Mind of Asia. D. Archer.
- Wright, S. Fowler, ed. (1924). "Fredoon Kabraji (Bombay)". From Overseas—First Series: An Anthology of Contemporary Dominion and Colonial Verse. London: Merton.
- Ganguly, Anil Baran, ed. (1984). Indian Poetry in English: An Anthology. Delhi: Atma Ram. pp. 153, 155.
- De Souza, Eunice (8 July 2010). Early Indian Poetry in English: An Anthology: 1829-1947. India: Oxford University Press India. ISBN 978-0195677249.

=== Journal articles ===
- Kabraji, Fredoon (September 1936). "The Patriots [poetry]". Left Review. 2 (12–16). UK: International Union of Revolutionary Writers, British Section: 638.
- Kabraji, Fredoon (January 1938). "India in Transition". The Political Quarterly. 9 (1). Wiley-Blackwell: 68–85. doi:10.1111/j.1467-923X.1938.tb01302.x.
- Kabraji, Fredoon (1949). "Ambassadors of a Wider Commonwealth [2 parts]". Eastern World. 3. East Asia: 22, 33.
- Kabraji, Fredoon (1949). "Ahmed Has Four Daughters". Eastern World. 3. East Asia: 36.

=== Articles in other periodicals ===
- Kabraji, Fredoon (18 October 1937). "The Reformer". Manchester Guardian. Manchester, England: Manchester Guardian Ltd. p. 16.
- Kabraji, Fredoon (1950). "Creative Literature in English by Indians". Sunday News of India. No. 27.

== Selected short poem ==
Tulip, tell me, what do you hold in your cup?
I hold in my cup the magic that swells the thirst of your soul, O Mother, when you look on the form of your child; the opiate that fills your dream, Mother, with the awe of the Unknown!
But, Tulip, tell me, why do you guard your magic beyond the wing of melody?
Because, ere Thought was, a kiss of Love did capture Death in the Seed of Life. That is why no melody of Life can hold all the magic in my cup, Mother; that is why Love cannot hold your child in Life alone!

— Fredoon Kabraji, "Tulip", in Sirdar Ikbal Ali Shah, The Oriental Caravan: A Revelation of the Soul and Mind of Asia (1933).

== Reception ==
In The Observer on 18 February 1945, the scholar and historian Edward Thompson criticises the "thoroughly bad" title of A Minor Georgian's Swan Song, and calls Kabraji's preface "brash" and that it would antagonise "powerful critics and versifiers". Thompson does praise the poem "I Look upon Simla", which is critical of the British colonialism and poverty in India, though he notes that the poem will "hardly delight all reviewers". Thompson also notes that Kabraji does not use standard metrical forms, alleging that the poet appears "frightened" by them. However he concludes that he has "no doubt that Kabraji has genius if he can find a way to express it."

Writing for the Manchester Guardian on 23 May 1945, Georgian poet Wilfrid Gibson is of the opinion that A Minor Georgian's Swan Song is "unhappily titled", because the author, Fredoon Kabraji "has no affiliations with any school and is an original poet". The reviewer adds that although Kabraji's work "suffers at times from diffuseness, [it] is remarkable for its range and for the versatility of its technique."

In A History of Indian Poetry in English (2016), editor Rosinka Chaudhuri describes Kabraji's This Strange Adventure: An Anthology of Poems in English by Indians, 1828-1946 as excellent, and "comprehensive and accommodating in its reach." She writes that after the "lean" years post-independence, there has been a "resurgence of interest" in such anthologies.
