= Jamshedji Sorab Kukadaru =

Zoroastrian priest and astrologer (1831-1900

Jamshedji Sorab Kukadaru (26 May 1831 – 4 October 1900) was a Zoroastrian priest in Mumbai, India. He was revered by Zoroastrians for a number of miracles he is believed to have performed. He was well known by his contemporaries for his simple lifestyle and asceticism, as well as his unflinching adherence to priestly purity rules. Most of his life is said to have been spent in prayer.

Kukadaru was also an astrologer of some repute. He was renowned for his spirituality, particularly his healing and divination. He is also reported to have prophesied several events (including the deaths of certain people, such as Empress Victoria).

Due to orthographic differences between English and Gujarati, he is also referred to as Dasturji Jamshedji Ervad Sohrabji Kookadaru Saheb and numerous other variations. Dasturji and Ervad are both honorific titles relating to his position as a priest, though they refer to different priestly ranks. This is unprecedented, as in his lifetime Kukadaru was only an Ervad, a medium-level 'mere ritual priest', not befitting the title of Dastur, which was granted after his death by the noted priest Jamasp-Asa at his Uthamna (Zoroastrian funeral prayers). The title Saheb given to him is another honorific, translated as 'master', it is often used in the Indian Subcontinent in reference to 'spiritual masters' like the Sikh Guru Granth Sahib.

== Lifestyle of Dasturji Kukadaru ==
Kukadaru was born on 26 May 1831 in Surat, Gujarat, India. The day according to the Zoroastrian calendar was Yazdegerdi Mah (month) Ava, Roj (day) Zamyad. Kukadaru moved from Surat to the city of Bombay to work as the priest of Kapawala Agiary (Fire-Temple) at Nizam Street, Baharkot.

Kukadaru Saheb lived a simple life which included washing his own clothes and eating only one meal a day which consisted of rice and ghee (clarified butter). This meal would be cooked by keeping a vessel of rice in the rays of the sun and reciting sacred Avestan verses. He did not eat meat, and only consumed milk and fruits.

== The Miracle of the Gold Bar ==
Several miracles are said to have been performed by Dasturji Kukadaru Saheb, the most famous of which is the Gold Bar miracle. Dasturji Saheb transformed an ordinary brick into a large bar of gold by praying the ancient Avestan prayers throughout the night. This was requested by the Zoroastrian devotees to cover a shortfall in the construction money for the Anjuman Atash Behram building at Dhobi Talao (Mumbai, India). The sum of 10,000 Rupees was raised by selling the transformed bar of gold, a large sum of money for the time. Even today, a portrait of Dasturji Kukadaru Saheb is placed in the hall of the Atash Behram, and similar portraits of Dasturji Kukadaru Saheb are placed in most of the Parsi Zoroastrian Atash Behrams and Agiaris (Fire Temples) in the Indian subcontinent. Dasturji Kukadaru Saheb is said to have also cured people of diseases by praying the Avestan scriptures of the Zoroastrian religion.

== Posthumous fame in the 20th Century ==
Kukadaru died on 4 January 1900 on the Yazdegerdi calendar day Behram in the month of Fravardin.

Many years after Dasturji Kukadaru Saheb had died, Ervad Nadarsha Navroji Aibara, a well-known priest of Cusrow Baug, Colaba, (Mumbai, India) was responsible for rekindling the faith in Dasturji Kukadaru Saheb among the Parsi Zoroastrian community in India and abroad.

== Mazagon Navjotes ==
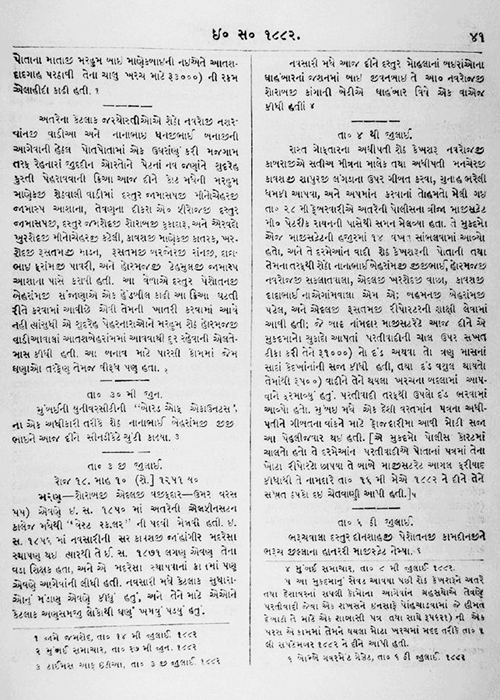
Mazgaon Navjotes, Parsi Prakash, Vol. 3, page 41.

Dasturji Kukadaru was reported to have participated in the Mazgaon Navjotes. In 1882, a group of poor dock workers living and working in the Mazgaon Docks appealed to various priests and petitioned the Bombay Parsi Panchayet (BPP) to be admitted as Parsi Zoroastrians, despite being born of mixed Zoroastrian and non-Zoroastrian parentage. Some 200 prominent Parsis collected funds and eminent priests (including Kukadaru and Jamaspji Minocherji,) performed the Navjote ceremony in the presence of a large gathering on 26 June 1882. At the time, it was said this act of generosity brought "prestige to the community". Eleven navjotes were performed of 4 males and 5 females adults ranging in age from 35 years to 77 years, as well as two children, ages 2 and 5, who were considered too young to undergo the ritual. It was understood that all of the initiates had male Parsi parentage. This event was reported in the Mumbai Samachar, Jam-e-Jamshed and Parsi Prakash’. Reformists Parsis, including the plaintiffs in the case of Petit vs. Jeejeebhoy cite the events of the Mazagon Navjotes as evidence of universal acceptance in Zoroastrianism.

== Nirang Prayers ==
Ervad Aibara mentioned that over the years, the spiritual power of Dasturji Kukadaru Saheb communicated with him regularly through his inner voice. Dasturji Kukadaru Saheb gave Ervad Aibara a number of nirangs (short prayers) and instructed him to give these nirangs to any person who came to him for help in difficulties. Many people benefited from these prayers in India as well as overseas, during the latter half of the 20th century. The faith in Dasturji Kukadaru Saheb spread considerably due to the power of these prayers.
