= Rohinton Kamakaka =

American biologist

Rohinton Tehmul Kamakaka
- Education: University of Cambridge
- Scientific career
- Fields: Molecular biology, developmental biology
- Workplaces: University of California, Santa Cruz
- Thesis: Distribution of histones H1 and H5, and other proteins in chromatin (1988)

Rohinton T Kamakaka is a professor in the Department of Molecular Cell and Developmental Biology at the University of California, Santa Cruz. Prior to that, he was Unit Chief at the National Institutes of Health. He received his PhD degree from the University of Cambridge, U.K.
