= Dhunjibhoy Bomanji =

Indian businessman and philanthropist

Bomanji in 1922.

Sir Dhunjibhoy Bomanji (1862 – 1 April 1937) was a Parsi shipping magnate, socialite and philanthropist. Bomanji was one of a wealthy family based in Bombay (now Mumbai), who eventually settled in England, becoming a pillar of British society. He divided his time between India and a house in Windsor and estate in Harrogate. Pineheath, the Bomanji's Harrogate house, was sold in 2013.

== Family ==
His wife was the Lady Frainy Bomanji (14 September 1893 – 1986) also known as Lady Harrogate and his adopted daughter Mehroo, a niece of Lady Bomanji (died 12 July 2012). Lady Bomanji founded The Friends of Harrogate International Festivals and was its president (1971-1973). Notable portrait painter Trevor Stubley's portrait of Lady Bomanji is held by Sheffield City Art Gallery.

== Philanthropy ==
Bomanji gave generously to charities which supported ex-servicemen and war widows following the First World War, and included Field Marshal Douglas Haig (1861–1928), Queen Victoria's granddaughter, Princess Alice, Countess of Athlone amongst his social circle. He also kissed Greta Garbo's forehead after outbidding everyone for charity. In 1892–93 he established Olympia Race Course in Matheran, Maharashtra. In 1906 he bought the lease of 161 (formerly 61) Holland Park Avenue for Eugen Sandow (1867–1925), a Victorian strongman. This four-storey end-of-terrace house was named Dhunjibhoy House – was his home for 19 years. In 1922 he built a model of Rotten Row, Hyde Park on his estate in Windsor to provide work for 250 unemployed men. In 1923, he gave a statue of Field Marshal Douglas Haig, by George Edward Wade to Edinburgh Corporation. It is now in Edinburgh Castle. The purchase price of £7,500 for Zoroastrian House at 11 Russell Road, Kensington was largely funded by a donation of £6,000 from Sir Dhunjibhoy and Lady Frainy Bomanji.

== Death ==
He died in Bombay on 1 April 1937.

== Knighthood ==
He was knighted in 1922 after using his enormous wealth to support Britain's fight against Germany during the First World War.

== Commemoration ==
A French marble statue sculpted by Charles Raphael Peyre was erected in the public gardens on Montpellier Hill, Harrogate in honour of Mehroo Jehangir and Lady Frainy Bomanji. It was received by Councillor Mike Newby, Mayor of the Borough of Harrogate.

The Pundol Group holds regular religious and social functions to commemorate Sir Dhunjibhoy Bomanji.
