= Rustom Jal Vakil =

Indian cardiologist

Rustom Jal Vakil (17 July 1911 – 20 November 1974) was a cardiologist from India who was awarded a Padma Bhushan for his contributions to medicine. He was the first Indian to win a Lasker Award.

Born in Bombay in 1911, Vakil completed his medical education in London. He pioneered the use of reserpine to control hypertension. Reserpine is derived from Indian Snakeroot, Rauwolfia serpentina, known in Bihar and Uttar Pradesh as Pagal-ki-dawa (‘'medicine for the insane'’) Himachal Pradesh. It was later explored as a treatment for schizophrenia.

== Books authored ==
- Clinical Diagnosis
- Textbook of Medicine
- The romance of healing and other essays
- Heart in Health and Disease

== Awards received ==
- 1958 Padma Bhushan
- 1959 International Albert Lasker Award
- 1965 Shanti Swaroop Bhatnagar Award
- 1969 B.C.Roy Award
- 1971 The V World Congress of Cardiology Souvenir Award by the Cardiological Society of India
- 1973 The First Dhanwantari Award
