= B. V. S. Parsi High School =

Bai Virbaiji Soparivala Parsi High School

Location
- Abdullah Haroon Road, Saddar; Karachi, Sindh; Pakistan; 24.86213°N 67.02501°E

Information
- Type: Private school
- Motto: Towards that Best Light
- Established: 23 May 1859; 167 years ago
- Chairman: Mr. Mehelli B. Dinshaw
- Administrator: Mr. Jamshed Sohrab Patel
- Principal: Mrs. Mehernaz Bharucha
- Houses: Soparivala; Sir Lancelot Graham; Quaid-e-Azam; Reza Shah Pahlavi
- Website: www.bvsparsischool.edu.pk

Bai Virbaijee Soparivala (BVS) Parsi High School is one of the oldest and most prestigious educational institutions in Karachi, Sindh, Pakistan. Founded on 23 May 1859 by members of the Zoroastrian (Parsi) community of Karachi, the school originally began as Karachi Parsi Balak Shalla, a small institution intended to provide education and religious instruction to young Parsi boys.

Over time, BVS developed into a major educational institution in the city and is widely regarded as an important part of Karachi’s educational and cultural history.

== History ==
=== Founding and early years (1859–1875) ===
The origins of the school trace back to the growing Parsi community of Karachi in the mid-19th century. In 1859, community leaders established a small school known as the Parsi Balakshala to provide education in religious teachings and the Gujarati language, which was widely spoken among Parsis at the time.

The first classes were held in the residence of Dadabhoy Palonji Paymaster. As the number of students increased, the need for a larger institution became evident.

In 1869, Seth Shapurji Hormusji Soparivala lost his wife, Bai Virbaiji. In her memory, he donated his two-storey residence on Frere Street and contributed Rs. 10,000 towards the institution. In May 1870 the school was formally renamed Parsi Virbaiji School in her honour. The opening ceremony of the new premises was held on 24 September 1870 and was officiated by the Commissioner of Sindh, Sir William Merewether.

=== Expansion and development ===
During the late nineteenth and early twentieth centuries, the school expanded rapidly as Karachi grew into a major port city of British India. By 1875 the institution became known as Bai Virbaiji Soparivala Parsi High School.

In 1904 the foundation stone of the present school building was laid on Victoria Road (now Abdullah Haroon Road). The building was designed by the noted architect Moses Somake, who was responsible for several prominent buildings in Karachi. The new campus opened in 1906.

The architectural design incorporated classical elements such as arched doorways, Corinthian capitals and tall pilasters, constructed using locally sourced Gizri stone. An additional storey was added in 1923 while maintaining the original architectural style.

=== Twentieth century developments ===
In April 1918, a separate girls’ section was introduced, although it later moved in 1919 to what became known as Mama Parsi Girls' School.

During the 1920s–1940s the institution expanded its curriculum and facilities. Technical and vocational classes were introduced and a workshop building was established in 1946.

Following the Partition of India in 1947, Muhammad Ali Jinnah requested the Parsi community to allow children of other communities to enroll at the school. Responding to this appeal, the administration opened admissions to Muslim and other non-Parsi students. This decision transformed the institution into a more inclusive school serving Karachi’s wider population.

=== Modern era ===
In 1958 the school celebrated its centenary, marking one hundred years of educational service to the city. Since then, BVS has continued to maintain a strong academic reputation and has produced graduates who have contributed to various fields including politics, journalism, business, and the arts.

The institution remains a prominent part of Karachi’s educational landscape and continues to uphold its motto, “Towards that Best Light.”

== Architecture ==
The present building of BVS Parsi High School is considered one of the notable colonial-era educational structures in Karachi. Designed by architect Moses Somake, the building reflects European classical influences combined with local stone construction.

Architectural features include:

- Large arched entrances
- Corinthian columns and capitals
- Tall pilasters and decorative stone masonry
- Use of Gizri limestone, common in historic Karachi buildings

These features give the school building a distinctive appearance and contribute to the architectural heritage of the Saddar district.

== Notable alumni ==
- Ardeshir Cowasjee – journalist and philanthropist
- Bilal Maqsood – musician and member of the band Strings
- Farooq Sattar – politician
- Murtaza Wahab – politician and Mayor of Karachi
- Irfan Essa – businessman

== Administration ==
=== School leadership ===
- Mrs. Mehernaz Bharucha – Principal
- Mrs. Kermin Parakh – Advisor to the School
- Mrs. Diana Randeria – Headmistress, AKU Section
- Mrs. Sofia Nasir Ali – Headmistress, CAIE Section
- Mrs. Parveen Pohwala – Headmistress, Primary Section

=== Office staff ===
- Mr. Jamshed Sohrab Patel – Administrator
- Mr. Naveed Shah – Assistant Administrator
