= Karl Singporewala =

British artist and architect

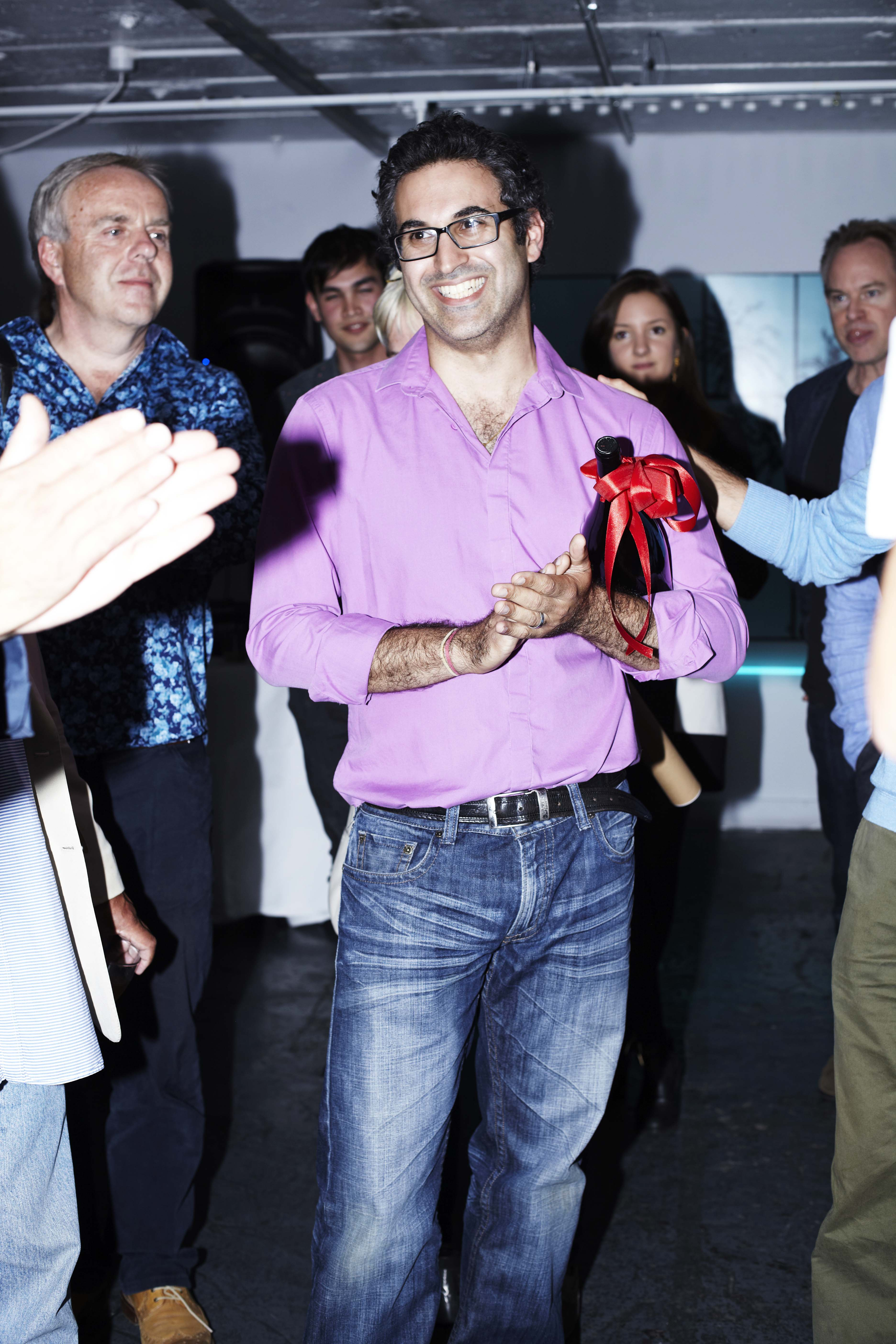
- Karl Singporewala accepting People's Choice HIX Art Award 2014
- Born: 1983 (age 42–43); England
- Education: De Montfort University, UK. University of Brighton, UK. The Bartlett, University College London, UK
- Known for: Architecture, Sculpture
- Notable work: "Dial M for Monument", "The Last Tower of Silence", "Joseph's Leonarvilions", "Franklin's Morals of Chess"
- Awards: British Construction Industry Awards Major Project of the Year 2016, Channel Four - 4Talent Winner UK's Top 20 Young Creatives, Royal Institute of British Architects South East Student Award, Nagoya University Award for Excellence in Architecture, People's Choice Winner HIX Art Award

Karl Keki Singporewala RWA is a Parsi-born British artist, architect and elected Royal Academician of Art at the Royal West of England Academy., born 1983 in Crawley, West Sussex. Studied architecture at Leicester School of Architecture, De Montfort University, post graduate architecture at University of Brighton and then a further post graduate at the Bartlett, University College London. He was made an honorary community fellow of SOAS University of London in April 2025 ahead of a solo exhibition of his early works at the SOAS Gallery, which specialises in contemporary exhibitions linked to Asia, Africa, and the Middle East.

In 2014 he was voted the 'People's Choice' HIX Art Award Winner at the Cock 'n' Bull Gallery, Shoreditch London in a competition aimed at emerging artists. In 2007 was awarded by Channel 4's 4Talent as one of the UK's young creative heroes Has donated numerous drawings and maquettes for charity, including auctioning various pieces for London-based charity Article 25 (formally Architects for Aid).

In 2017, his work was exhibited at the Saatchi Gallery, London. Recognised for his mathematical geometries, religious subplots and love affair with London's buildings his work is generally exhibited through the Royal Academy of Arts, London.

In 2020, his photo etched brass sculpture 'Doppel Communion' was the recipient of the inaugural Royal West of England Academy - Art Prize for a work by an artist of Black Asian or Ethnic Minority heritage.
