= Bejan Daruwalla =

Indian astrologer (1931–2020)

- Born: 11 July 1931; Bharuch, India
- Died: 29 May 2020 (aged 88); Ahmedabad, India
- Occupations: Astrologer, professor
- Children: Nastur Daruwalla
- Website: bejandaruwalla.com

Bejan Jehanjir Daruwalla (11 July 1931 – 29 May 2020) was an Indian English professor and astrology columnist. Daruwalla was a Ganesha devotee and practiced various divination systems.

== Biography ==
A former English professor of Parsi heritage, Daruwalla was an ardent follower of Ganesha.

Bejan Daruwalla died on 29 May 2020 in Ahmedabad, India. After the news of his death emerged, several media reports suggested that he had died due to COVID-19. His astrologer-son, Nastur, told The Times of India that his father had pneumonia and lung infection, and the oxygen level in his body had dipped.

== Work ==
Daruwalla's divination practices included Numerology, Hindu astrology, Palmistry, I Ching, Tarot card reading, Kabbalah and Western astrology.

Daruwalla was associated with the astrology portal GaneshaSpeaks since its inception in 2003 and co-founded the platform along with Hemang Arunbhai Pandit.

Through GaneshaSpeaks, Daruwalla expanded his presence in digital astrology services, horoscope consultation, Feng Shui guidance, and online astrological content. The platform also launched astrology-related mobile and online services during the late 2000s.

Several news publications described GaneshaSpeaks as Daruwalla's astrological portal and noted its large online following.

Daruwalla summed up his general approach and technique of making predictions like this, "First of all, if the person is there I look at him and get vibrations. Secondly, the time the person comes is important. Thirdly, what type of day is it? Good, bad or indifferent? Fourth, lines on the palm. Fifth, the Indian horoscope and lastly, the western horoscope. So all this goes into a computer called the brain. And after that I look at Ganesha and make a prediction."

== Awards ==
- Lifetime Achievement Award by Ahmedabad Parsi Panchayat
- Eminence awards 2019 by Chief Minister of Gujarat Shri Vijay Rupani
- Best Astrologer by the Russian Society of Astrologer
