= Homi Kharas =

British economist

Homi Kharas (born September 1959) is a British economist who has been a senior fellow and deputy director for the global economy and development program at the Brookings Institution since 2005.

== Early life and education ==
Kharas gained his bachelor's degree from King's College, Cambridge in 1975. He gained his PhD in economics from Harvard University in 1980.

== Career ==
=== World Bank ===
From 1980, Kharas spent 26 years at the World Bank, serving for seven years as chief economist for the World Bank's East Asia and Pacific region and as director for poverty reduction and economic management, finance and private sector development. Along with Indermit Gill, he developed the novel concept of 'middle income traps'.

From 1990 to 1991, Kharas was a senior partner with Jeff Sachs and Associates, advising governments in Eastern Europe and the Soviet Union on transition.

=== Brookings Institution ===
Kharas began his career at the Brookings Institution in 2005 at the Wolfensohn Center for Development, where he pioneered foreign aid reform analyses, measuring the volatility of aid, quality of foreign aid, new players in development, including individuals and foundations, and helped develop the center's strategy along that of the global economy and development program. Kharas is a recognized foreign aid expert and has advised donors, foundations and emerging/developing country governments on best practices in the area.

Kharas is principal investigator of several grants to Brookings, including the Bill & Melinda Gates Foundation sponsored, Ending Rural Hunger and Brookings Blum Roundtable.

He has served as the lead author and executive secretary of the secretariat supporting the High Level Panel, co-chaired by Ellen Johnson Sirleaf, Susilo Bambang Yudhoyono and David Cameron, advising United Nations Secretary General Ban Ki-moon on the Post-2015 Development Agenda (2012-2013). The report, "A New Global Partnership: Eradicate Poverty and Transform Economies through Sustainable Development" was presented on May 30, 2013, and served as the basis for Sustainable Development Goals discussions.

He has served as a member on the International Panel Review Committee on Malaysia's economic and governance transformation programs (2012); the post-Busan Advisory Group to the Organisation for Economic Co-operation and Development's Development Assistance Committee co-chairs (2011); the National Economic Advisory Council to Prime Minister Najib Razak of Malaysia (2009–10); and a member of the working group for the Commission on Growth and Development, chaired by Professor A. Michael Spence (2007–10). He was a non-resident fellow of the OECD Development Centre (2009). In June 2021, he was appointed to the World Bank–International Monetary Fund High-Level Advisory Group (HLAG) on Sustainable and Inclusive Recovery and Growth, co-chaired by Mari Pangestu, Ceyla Pazarbasioglu, and Nicholas Stern.

== Publications ==
Kharas has published articles, book chapters and opinion pieces on global development policy, global trends, the global food crisis, international organizations, the G20, the DAC and private philanthropy.

Books

- 2010: Delivering Aid Differently (Brookings Institution Press)
- 2011: Catalyzing Development: A New Vision for Aid (Brookings Press)
- 2012: After the Spring: Economic Transitions in the Arab World (Oxford University Press)
- 2013: Getting to Scale: How to Bring Development Solutions to Millions of Poor People (Brookings Press)
- 2015: The Last Mile in Ending Extreme Poverty (Brookings Press)
