= Ness B. Shroff =

American engineer

- Education: Columbia University; University of Pennsylvania; University of Southern California
- Known for: Contributions to wireless network optimization and control
- Awards: NSF Career Award (1996) IEEE Fellow (2007) IEEE Conference on Computer Communications (INFOCOM) Achievement Award (2014)
- Scientific career
- Fields: Electrical and Computer Engineering, Computer Science, Communication Networks, Machine Learning, Optimization
- Workplaces: The Ohio State University (2007–present); Purdue University (1994–2007)
- Doctoral advisor: Mischa Schwartz
- Doctoral students: Junyi Li

Ness B. Shroff is an American engineer, educator and researcher known for contributions to wireless networking, network control, and network analysis. He is professor in ECE and CSE departments at Ohio State University, where he holds the Ohio Eminent Scholar Chaired Professorship of Networking and Communications.

== Education ==
Shroff received his B.S. from the University of Southern California in 1988, his M.S. from the University of Pennsylvania in 1990, his MPhil from Columbia University, in 1993, and his PhD from Columbia University, NY in 1994.

== Career and research ==
Shroff and his PhD student Xin Liu and colleague Edwin Chong were among the first researchers to recognize the importance of opportunistic scheduling in wireless networks with short-term fairness Opportunistic scheduling is the idea that variability in wireless channel quality can be exploited to maximize network throughput while taking into account some measure of quality of service. Using connections to convex optimization theory and stochastic approximations, he developed online opportunistic scheduling mechanisms that could guarantee a variety of explicit fairness guarantees. Opportunistic scheduling is now a part of the communication paradigm in every modern mobile phone.

Shroff with his PhD student Xiaojun Lin were among the first researchers to show that a network utility maximization framework of wireless resource allocation provides a mathematical interpretation of the functionalities of the various layers of the network protocol stack. Specifically, by making a connection to Lagrange multiplier theory in convex optimization, they showed that queue length information shared across multiple layers provided the right feedback to design resource allocation algorithms for the transport, network and medium access control protocols. These tools and techniques have now become standards in cross-layer network design and his survey paper on opportunistic scheduling and cross-layer design was also influential in making the topic widely accessible to a large audience.

Shroff and his PhD student Sellke developed a novel technique to protect computer networks for Internet worms and viruses. combat the most dangerous form of computer virus. The technique automatically detects when an Internet worm has infected a network and signals network administrators to isolate the infected machine and quarantine them for repairs.

Shroff, his postdoc Yin Sun, along with colleagues, were the first researchers to show how to optimally manage the freshness of information updates sent from a source node to a destination via a channel. A proper metric for data freshness at the destination is the age-of-information, or simply age, which is defined as how old the freshest received update is since the moment that this update was generated at the source node (e.g., a sensor). A well known update policy is the zero-wait policy, i.e., the source node submits a fresh update once the previous update is delivered and the channel becomes free, which achieves the maximum throughput and the minimum delay. In this work, Shroff et al. show the surprising result that the zero-wait policy does not always minimize the age. Their investigation shows that the zero-wait policy is far from the optimum if (i) the age penalty function grows quickly with respect to the age, (ii) the packet transmission times over the channel are positively correlated over time, or (iii) the packet transmission times are highly random (e.g., following a heavy-tail distribution). This was a seminal result in the area of age of information and received the IEEE INFOCOM 2026 Test of Time Award that recognizes papers published between 10 to 12 years ago (a three-year window) in the INFOCOM proceedings that have been widely recognized to have a significant impact on the research community.

Shroff is currently leading a large multi-organization team, composed of universities, private companies, and research labs, which has been selected by the National Science Foundation for developing new Artificial Intelligence techniques to design future wireless networks.

== Awards and honors ==
- Best Paper Award, IEEE INFOCOM 2006, 2008 and 2016.
- Appears on the List of Most highly cited researchers Thomson Reuters 2014 and 2015.
- IEEE INFOCOM 2014 achievement award
- Appears on the List of The World's Most Influential Scientific Minds in 2014.
- Best student paper award, IEEE WiOPT 2012 and 2013.
- IEEE Fellow (Class of 2007) for contributions to the modeling, analysis and control of computer communication networks.
- 2005 Best paper of the year award, Journal of Communications and Networks.
- 2003 Best paper of the year award, Computer Networks.
- 1996 NSF Career Award
