= Adi Bulsara =

Indian American scientist (born 1951)

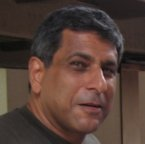
- Born: 15 May 1951 (age 75); Bombay, India
- Education: University of Texas at Austin
- Known for: Nonlinear dynamics
- Scientific career
- Fields: Physicist
- Workplaces: SPAWAR
- Doctoral advisor: Ilya Prigogine

Ardeshir "Adi" Ratan Bulsara (Gujarati: અરદેશર રતન વલસાડા; born 15 May 1951) is an Indian American scientist in the area nonlinear dynamics. The 2007 International Conference on Applied Nonlinear Dynamics (ICAND), held in Kauai, Hawaii, was a festschrift held in his honor of his 55th birthday.

== Honours ==
In 2004, Bulsara was elected to Fellow of the American Physical Society (APS) for "developing the statistical mechanics of noisy nonlinear dynamical oscillators especially in the theory, application and technology of stochastic resonance detectors." His festschrift in honor of his 55th birthday, which, for logistic reasons, was held when he was 56.

== Books by Bulsara ==
- S. Baglio and A. Bulsara, (editors) Device Applications of Nonlinear Dynamics, Springer-Verlag, Berlin, 2006, ISBN 3-540-33877-2
- A. Bulsara, Noise and Chaos in the RF SQUID, Office of Naval Research, 1992, ASIN B0006R2M5I
- A. Bulsara, Coupled Neural-Dendritic Processes: Cooperative Stochastic Effects and the Analysis of Spike Trains, Office of Naval Research, 1994, ASIN B0006R2O9C
- J. B. Kadtke and A. Bulsara, (editors) Applied Nonlinear Dynamics and Stochastic Systems Near the Millen[n]ium, 411, San Diego, CA, American Institute of Physics, Woodbury, N.Y., 1997, ISBN 1563967367
