= Shirin Darasha =

Indian educator, playwright, feminist

Shirin Framroze Darasha
- Born: 27 December 1938
- Died: 2 May 2012 (aged 73)
- Occupations: Pedagogy, feminist, playwright

Shirin Framroze Darasha (27 December 1938 – 2 May 2012) headed the J.B. Petit High School For Girls as the School Principal for over three decades, from 1973 – 2007. A renowned Indian educator, playwright and feminist, she challenged many stereotypes and traditions in Indian society. She had strong views on the importance of "joy" during childhood. She was not in favour of the excessive work-load and homework fetish that continued to dominate the Indian educational scene. She took issue with the prevalent view that girls were at a disadvantage apropos of mathematics and sciences. Darasha maintained that in a nurturing environment where they were not set up to fail in comparison with boys, girls would flourish and blossom. Her creative use of drama in education was an extension of her enduring interest in the stage – as playwright, producer and director. Over the years, Darasha established herself as a distinct and passionate figure in the field of female education in India.

== Early life and education ==
Shirin Darasha was born to a Parsi family and raised in Bombay, India.

On graduating (matriculation) from Queen Mary School, Bombay she attended St. Xavier's College, Mumbai, studying for a Bachelor's in Psychology. On completion, she studied further to earn her master's degree in psychology, also from Bombay University. To pursue further studies abroad, Shirin Darasha was awarded the Fulbright scholarship. She completed her master's degree in education from East-West Center, Hawaii.

== Career as playwright ==
Darasha was a talented playwright who focused on themes and personalities associated with twentieth century Indian history. Her popular play "Madam Cama" was first staged in 1988. In 1990, during the Fifth World Zoroastrian Congress, a special performance of the play was included in the proceedings. The play was also televised on Doordarshan. In her plays, Darasha challenged social conventions that resulted in women being stereotyped. She was particularly caustic about matrimonial advertisements; she dealt head-on with the Indian preference for "light complexions" and made a characteristic case for how "dark skin" was beautiful. Darasha's collaborations with Pearl Padamsee in various stage productions in Mumbai were well known and widely admired.

Inspirational blessing that Shirin Darasha handed out to each and every student and teacher who was under her aegis when she was principal

== Career as principal ==
After working, at Hindi Vidya Bhavan and The Bombay International School, Darasha was appointed as Principal of J.B. Petit School in 1972. She was also known for encouraging her students to be more open as her front door donned the sign "Please Do Disturb". She incorporated what she learned from the performing arts into her teachings and used the concepts of drama to instill confidence in her pupils.

Darasha was elated when her J.B. School Debate Team won the all-India Debate Competition hosted by the Foundation for Universal Responsibility of His Holiness the Dalai Lama; the prize was a trip for the whole debate team and for Darasha to visit the Dalai Lama at his ashram and have a private audience with him. This was particularly appropriate given Darasha's interest and identification with Buddhism. In February 1988, Zoroastrian community magazine Parsiana ran an article entitled "The 'Principal' of Drama" which focused on her lifelong passion for the stage. In her interview, she declared that she did not consider herself religious, though she had Buddhist leanings.

== Death ==
At the age of 73, Shirin Darasha died of pulmonary fibrosis. She was cremated, and her funeral was attended by hundreds of students and teachers who had been taught, mentored and inspired by her over the decades.
