= Homi Maneck Mehta =

Indian industrialist (1871–1948)

Sir Homi Maneck Mehta KCIE, KBE, JP
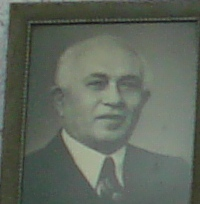
- Born: 1 April 1871; Mumbai (Bombay), India
- Died: 15 April 1948 (aged 77); Shannon Airport, Eire
- Occupation: Industrialist

Sir Homi Maneck Mehta KCIE KBE JP (1 April 1871 – 15 April 1948) was an Indian industrialist.

== Early years ==
Homi Maneck Mehta was born in Mumbai (Bombay) to poor Parsi parents. He attended Elphinstone High School and after school life, by hard work and perseverance he rose from being a clerk and became a millionaire through textiles, banking and insurance. He started working at the age of 17 in the Bombay Mint at a wage of Rs 20 a month (£1.50). He managed to save enough to travel to the UK and there he gained his knowledge of textiles as an operative in the Lancashire Cotton Industry. He also attended engineering classes during his apprenticeship.

== Career ==
In his mid twenties Sir Homi started business life in Mumbai and in 1896 founded the Mill Stores Trading Co of India Ltd. He slowly attained controlling interests in a number of cotton mills in Mumbai as well as in the State of Baroda. Apart from his own mills in Navsari and Gaekwar, he was managing director of two Indian insurance companies and also of chemical and sugar companies. Sir Homi was also involved in banking and was on the Central Board of the Reserve Bank of India and served on many select committees. Sir Homi also used his experience and expertise in East Africa and was one of many Indian Industrialists investing in the textile industry in Uganda.

=== Companies Founded by Sir Homi ===
Sir Homi's first company was the Mill Stores Trading Co of India Ltd, from that came his purchase of the Victoria Mills Ltd in 1904 in partnership with Seth Mangaldas G Parakh of Ahmedabad. Later on they bought the Jubilee and Raja Gokaldas Mills which became Limited Companies. Sir Homi's business ventures began to thrive and he floated many other diverse companies such as The British India General Insurance Co Ltd, The Zenith Life Assurance Co Ltd, The Poona Electric Supply Co Ltd, The Northern India Portland Cement Co Ltd, Messrs T R Pratt (Bombay) Ltd and many others.

In 1928 Sir Homi purchased the Cotton Mill at Bilimora. He also floated The Nasik-Deolali Electric Supply Co Ltd and the Nadiad Electric Supply Co Ltd in 1929 and 1931 respectively

== Public life ==
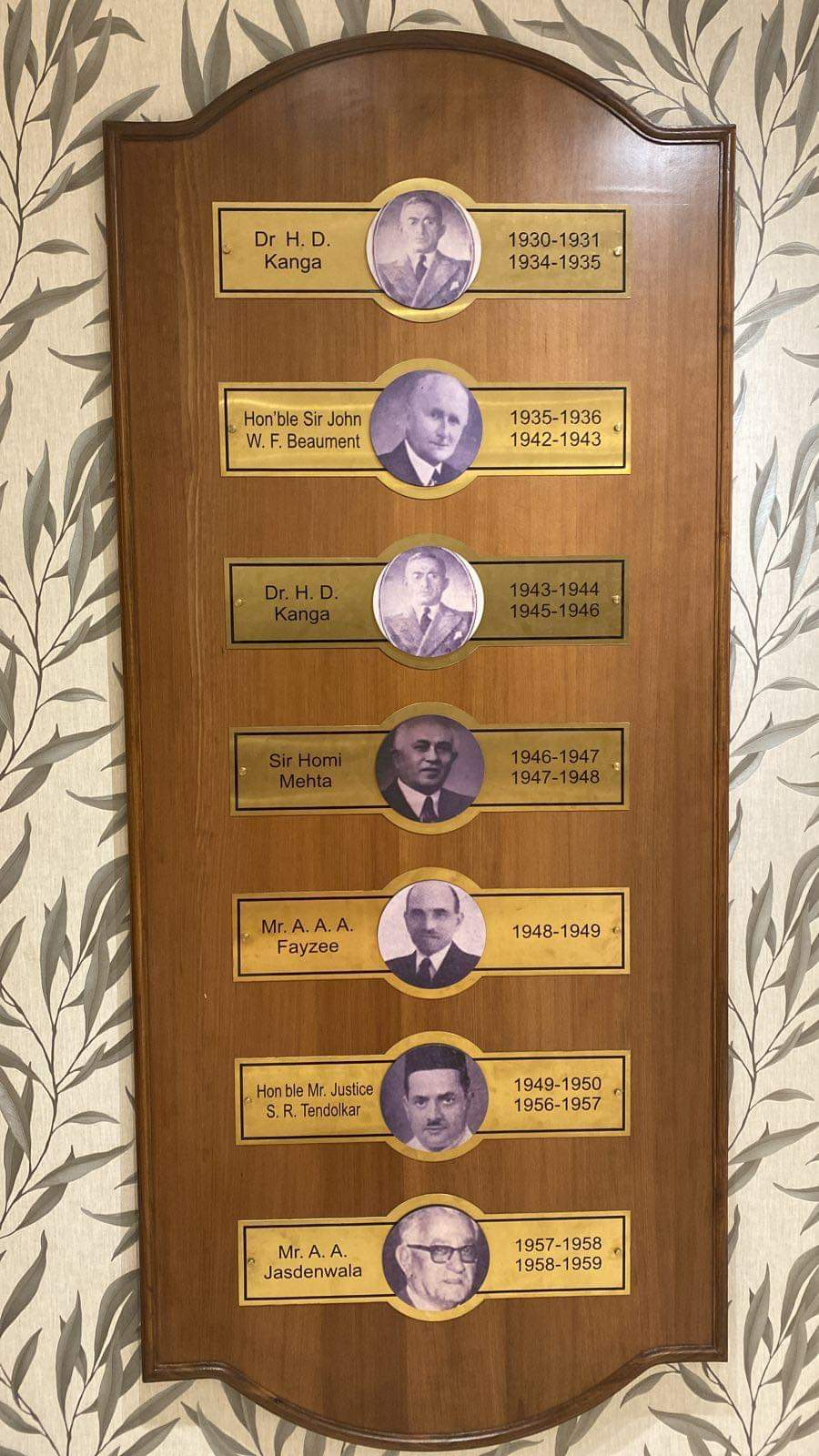
Plaque at Wankhede Stadium, Mumbai

Despite being a busy industrialist, Sir Homi had time for public and philanthropic work. In 1930 he was elected to the Council of State and in 1932, he was appointed on the Bihar and Orissa Committee to demarcate the boundaries of the new Orissa Province. He represented India at the League of Nations in 1933-34 and in 1936, he represented the employers of India at the International Labour Conference in Geneva.

In 1941, Sir Homi was invited to the Presidency of the Bombay National Democratic Union which body strongly supported the War effort. In 1945 the media reported that there were not proper amenities for Indian troops and he was invited by the Viceroy Lord Wavell to visit Indian camps in war zones to investigate these allegations.

In 1944, Sir Homi chaired the Bombay War Gift Fund and later after the war the Victory Thanksgiving Fund. He and his committees were responsible for raising £4m in total (quoted in The Times Obituary 17 Apr 1948).

== Other interests ==
In 1934 The Bombay Hockey Association was established and Sir Homi was the first president. He was also President of the Bombay Photographic Society 1944-45.

Sir Homi was President of the Bombay Cricket Association for two years between 1946-48. Sir Homi had a Cricket XI that entered the Bombay Festival Tournament of 1946/47. They reached the final drawing with AA Jasdenwala's XI at the Brabourne Stadium. Notable players in Sir Homi's team were two Indian Test Players Dattatraya Gajanan Phadkar (batsman and right arm off break and fast medium bowler) and Khanderao Moreshwar Rangnekar (right arm medium pace bowler).

== Knighthood ==
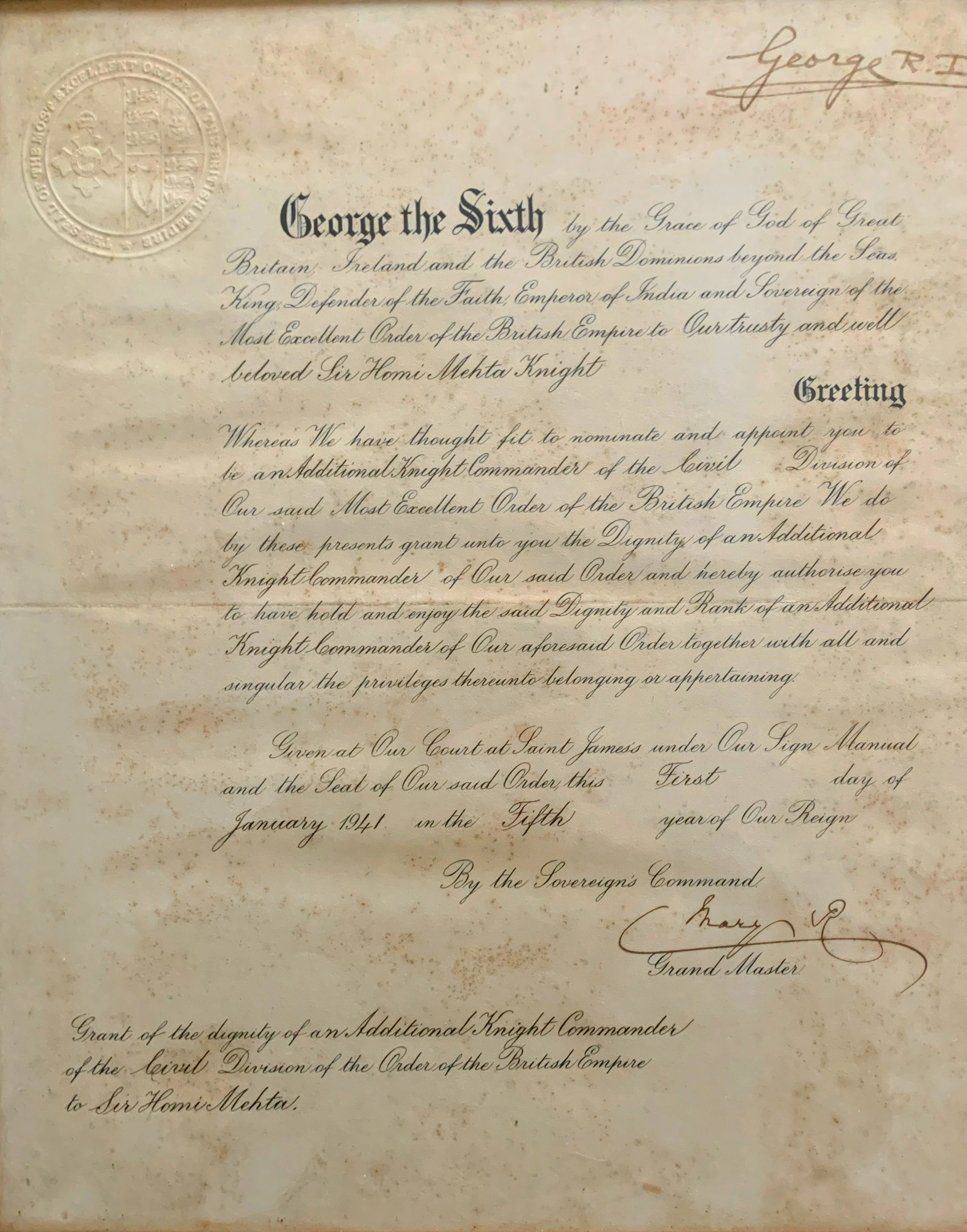
Sir Homi’s KBE insignia

Homi Mehta was knighted by King George V in 1933 and received further honours from King George VI in 1941 KBE and in 1946 KCIE.

== Death ==
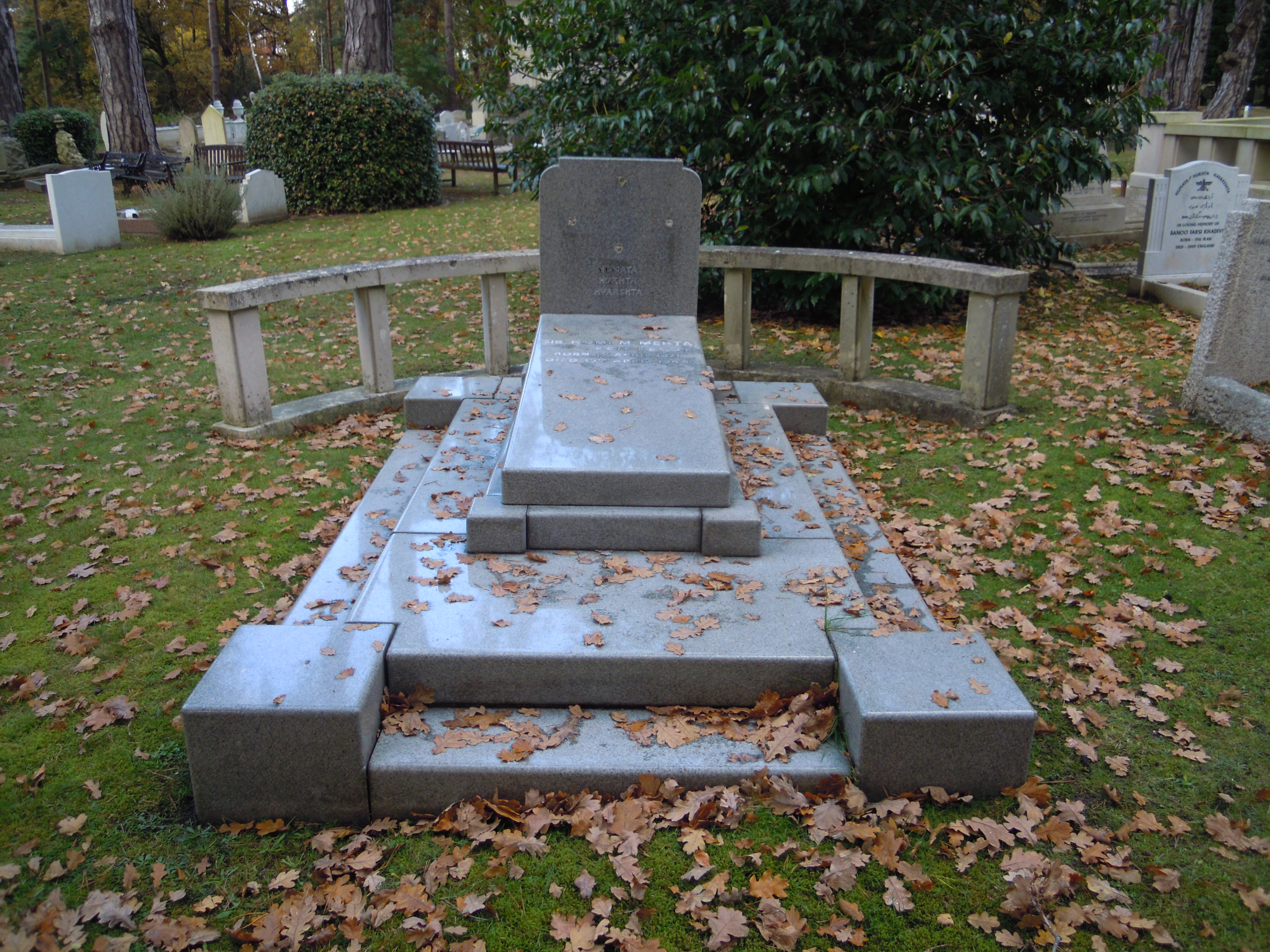
The grave of Sir Homi Maneck Mehta in Brookwood Cemetery

Sir Homi was killed in the Pan American Constellation crash in April 1948 at Shannon Airport in which 30 persons perished and there was only one survivor. He is buried in Brookwood Cemetery.
