= Dossabhoy Muncherji Raja =

Khan Sahib Dossabhoy Muncherji Raja
- Khan Sahib Dossabhoy Muncherji Raja
- Born: 11 June 1876; Poona, British India
- Died: September 1947 (aged 71)
- Known for: First native Indian appointed Principal Appraiser in Bombay Customs
- Title: Khan Sahib
- Children: Minocher D. M. Raja

Khan Sahib Dossabhoy Muncherji Raja (11 June 1876 – 28 September 1947) was the first native Indian to be appointed 'Principal Appraiser' of precious stones for the Customs Office of the Bombay Presidency, which was then a province of British India.

== Early life and career ==
Dossabhoy Raja was born in Poona (now Pune), British India. He completed his early education at St. Vincent's School and later attended Poona Centre University, where he ranked 17th in the Matriculation examination. At the age of 20, he moved to Bombay (now Mumbai) and graduated from St. Xavier's College, Mumbai.

He joined His Majesty's Customs in 1899 and rose through the ranks, becoming Junior Appraiser in 1913. He represented the Customs Department on the Uniform Weights and Measures Commission, chaired by Sir Arthur Crawford, ICS.

Later, he was appointed as a Censor in the Customs Department and was commended for handling several complex customs cases. In 1929, he became a gazetted officer as Principal Appraiser. He also served as Senior Postal Appraiser and subsequently as Principal Postal Appraiser.

He retired in 1932 after 33 years of service. In recognition of his loyal and meritorious service, he was awarded the title of Khan Sahib by the Viceroy and Governor General of India, Lord Willingdon on 2 January 1933. Even post-retirement, the then Collector of Customs, Mr. M. Sted, ICS, considered sending him on a special assignment to Kutch and Bhuj, which he declined due to ill health.

== Role in anti-smuggling operation ==
Raja was instrumental in apprehending a gang of smugglers in the Bombay Presidency. Disguised in traditional attire as a Gujarati trader, he undertook a covert mission to Jamnagar—then outside British jurisdiction—to gather intelligence. His actions led to the successful arrest of the culprits and earned him the Khan Sahib title.

== Cricket and social life ==
For over three decades, Raja was an active cricketer with various Parsee clubs. He was known for his strong batting and fielding, playing alongside his elder brother Dadi Raja. Both were part of the Sir Jamsetjee Jeejeebhoy Club's Shapur Spencer Company. At the time, Parsee cricketers wore traditional garments such as a sudreh, badian, and jacket on the field.

He was a well-regarded member and captain of the Customs Club and was widely known for his jovial nature and leadership.

== Death ==
Khan Sahib Dossabhoy Muncherji Raja died in September 1947 in Bombay at the age of 71. He is survived by his wife, Tehmina; his only son, Minocher D. M. Raja (also an officer in the Bombay Customs Appraising Department); and his brothers, Dadi and Shapurji Raja.

== Legacy ==
The Sanad (citation) and medal of the Khan Sahib title awarded to Dossabhoy Raja are preserved by his descendants in Mumbai.

== Gallery ==
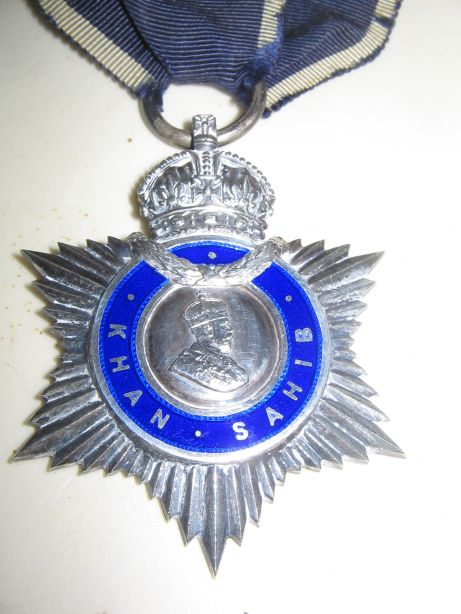
The Khan Sahib medal awarded to Dossabhoy Muncherji Raja on 2 January 1933

Back of the medal showing Raja's name and award date engraved

The Sanad (citation) awarded by Lord Willingdon

Obituary published in Bombay Samachar (Gujarati)
