= N. H. Wadia =

Indian physician

- Born: 20 January 1925
- Died: 10 April 2016 (aged 91)
- Awards: Padma Bhushan

Noshir Hormusjee "N. H." Wadia (20 January 1925 – 10 April 2016) was an Indian physician. He was a prominent figure in the field of neurology. Wadia was given the Padma Bhushan award by the Government of India. He was also given the Certificate of Appreciation for Services to Neurology by the World Federation of Neurology in 1993. He pioneered the practice of neurology in India.

== Career ==
Noshir Hormusjee Wadia entered Grant Medical College, Bombay in 1943 and finished his MD Medicine from there in 1948, and did his MRCP from London. He joined as a Registrar, Neurology to Lord Brain, National Hospital for Nervous Diseases (1952–56), and then to the London Hospital as a Registrar and Tutor at the Medical School. He came back to India in 1957 and became Honorary Assistant Neurologist to his beloved alma mater. He served as a lecturer in neurology (1961–68) and Honorary Professor (1968–82), Grant Medical College. He headed the Neurology department at Grant Medical College and Sir J. J. Group of Hospitals for 25 years till 1982, when he stepped down and had his position taken by Bhimsen Singhal, one of his students. On retirement, he joined as a Consultant for Life at the Grant Medical College and Sir J. J. Group of Hospitals, and he was the Director, Neurology Department at Jaslok Hospital and Research Centre (1973 to-date). He was felicitated DSc (hc) by Banaras Hindu University (1999).

== Books ==
N H Wadia is an author of book in Neurology 'Neurological Practice :An Indian Perspective.' He is one of the contributors of the book Tropical Neurology.

== Notable works ==
Wadia has explored neurological manifestations of Acute hemorrhagic conjunctivitis due to enterovirus E 70.

- He described a new form of heredofamilial spinocerebellar degeneration with slow eye movements a completely new to the world. This later went on to be designated SCA 2.
- Myelopathy Complicating Congenital Atlanto Axial Dislocation.
- Atypical Features in acoustic neuroma.
- Venous signs in Cerebral Angioma.

== Awards and recognition ==
Indian Academy of Neurology has set up an oration in annual conference in the name of Wadia.

- The Certificate of Appreciation for Services to Neurology by World Federation of Neurology (1993)
- First Rameshwardas Birla National Award for an Outstanding Practising Clinician in Modern Medicine (1999)
- Lifetime Achievement Award in Medical Excellence by Harvard Medical International and Wockhardt Ltd for Pioneering and Immense Contributions in Speciality of Neurology,
- SS Bhatnagar Medal for Excellence in General Science by INSA (2003)
- Dhanvantari Award by Dhanvantari Medical Foundation for Outstanding Contribution in Medicine (2003)
- Shree Dhanwantari Prize by INSA (2006). He was elected Fellow of the National Academy of Medical Sciences (1972)
- Indian Academy of Sciences, Bangalore (1983)
- Royal College of Physicians, London (1970)
- Padma Bhushan, New Delhi, (2013)
