= States Reorganisation Commission =

Indian Government commission

The States Reorganisation Commission of India (SRC) constituted by the Central Government of India in December 1953 to recommend the reorganization of state boundaries. In September 1955, after two years of study, the Commission, comprising Justice Fazal Ali, K. M. Panikkar and H. N. Kunzru, submitted its report. The commission's recommendations were accepted with some modifications and implemented in the States Reorganisation Act in November 1956. The act provided that India's state boundaries should be reorganized to form 14 states and 6 centrally administered territories. On 10 December 1948, the report of Dhar Commission was published but the issue remained unsolved.

== Background ==
India Administrative Divisions in 1951

After India became independent from the British Empire in 1947, the constituent units of India were classified under the following distinct categories:

Category	Description	Administrator	States
Part A states	Former British provinces	An elected governor and state legislature	9 states: Assam, Bihar, Bombay, East Punjab, Madhya Pradesh, Madras, Odisha, Uttar Pradesh, and West Bengal
Part B states	Former princely states or groups of Covenanting states	Rajpramukh (former princes)	9 states: Hyderabad, Jammu and Kashmir, Madhya Bharat, Mysore, Patiala and East Punjab States Union (PEPSU), Rajasthan, Saurashtra, Travancore-Cochin, and Vindhya Pradesh
Part C	Former princely states and provinces	Chief commissioner	10 states: Ajmer, Coorg, Cooch-Behar, Bhopal, Bilaspur, Delhi, Himachal Pradesh, Kutch, Manipur, and Tripura
Part D	Union Territory	Governor appointed by the Indian president	Andaman and Nicobar Islands

The borders of these states, inherited from British India, were not suitable for easy administration. The internal provincial borders of British India were a result of historical events, as well as political, military and strategic planning by the British. The Government agreed that the reorganisation of state borders was necessary, but the basis of reorganisation was yet to be determined.

One of the proposals was to reorganise the state on the basis of languages of India. This would make administration easier, and would help replace the caste and religion-based identities with less controversial linguistic identities. Earlier in 1920, the members of the Indian National Congress had agreed on the linguistic reorganisation of the Indian states as one of the party's political goals. The Provincial Committees of the party were set on this basis since 1920. In 1927, the Congress declared that it was committed to "the redistribution of provinces on a linguistic basis", and reaffirmed its stance several times, including in the election manifesto of 1945-46.

But, soon after independence, the Congress-led Government became concerned that the states formed solely on a linguistic basis might be unsuitable, and might even pose a risk to the national unity. On 17 June 1948, Rajendra Prasad, the President of the Constituent Assembly, set up the Linguistic Provinces Commission (aka Dhar Commission) to recommend whether the states should be reorganised on linguistic basis or not. The committee included SK Dhar (retired Judge of the Allahabad High Court), Jagat Narain Lal (lawyer and member of constituent assembly) and Panna Lall (retired Indian Civil Service officer). In its 10 December 1948 report, the Commission recommended that "the formation of provinces on exclusively or even mainly linguistic considerations is not in the larger interests of the Indian nation." It recommended the reorganisation of the provinces of Madras, Bombay and Central Provinces and Berar primarily on the basis of geographical contiguity, financial self-sufficiency and ease of administration. Soon after the report was published, the Congress, at its Jaipur session, set up the "JVP committee" to study the recommendations of the Dhar Commission. The committee consisted of Jawaharlal Nehru and Vallabhbhai Patel, in addition to the Congress president Pattabhi Sitaramayya. In its report dated 1 April 1949, the Committee stated that the time was not suitable for formation of new provinces, but also stated that the "public sentiment is insistent and overwhelming, we, as democrats, have to submit to it, but subject to certain limitations in regard to the good of India as a whole."

Dr. B. R. Ambedkar submitted a Memorandum (dated 14 October 1948) to the Dhar Commission, supporting the formation of linguistic provinces, specifically the formation of the Marathi-majority Maharashtra state with Bombay as its capital. To address the concern of national unity, he suggested that the official language of every province should be same as the official language of the Central Government. KM Munshi, a Gujarati leader opposed to incorporation of Bombay in the proposed Maharashtra state, opposed the linguistic reorganisation proposal, saying that "the political ambition of a linguistic group can only be satisfied by the exclusion and discrimination of other linguistic groups within the area. No safeguards and no fundamental rights can save them from the subtle psychological exclusion which linguism implies."

By 1952, the demand for creation of a Telugu-majority state in the parts of the Madras State had become powerful. Potti Sreeramulu, a Congress activist who demanded the formation of a Telugu-majority state, died on 16 December 1952 after undertaking a fast-unto-death. Subsequently, the Telugu-majority Andhra State was formed in 1953. This development sparked agitations all over the country, with linguistic groups demanding separate states.

== States Reorganisation Commission ==
The States Reorganisation Commission submitted its report on 30 September 1955, with the following recommendations:

1. The three-tier (Part-A/B/C) state system should be abolished...
2. The institution of Rajapramukh and special agreement with former princely states should be abolished
3. The general control vested in Government of India by Article 371 should be abolished
4. Only the following 3 states should be the Union Territories: Andaman & Nicobar, Delhi and Manipur. The other Part-C/D territories should be merged with the adjoining states

The report was tabled in the Lok Sabha on 14 December 1955.

In Part II of Report of the States Reorganisation Commission (SRC) 1955, titled "Factors Bearing on Reorganisation", the Commission clearly said that "it is neither possible nor desirable to reorganise States on the basis of the single test of either language or culture, but that a balanced approach to the whole problem is necessary in the interest of our national unity."

== Implementation ==
The States Reorganisation Act of 1956 implemented some of the recommendations of the SRC. In addition to the three Union Territories (UTs) proposed by the SRC, it also established Laccadive, Minicoy & Amindivi Islands, Himachal Pradesh and Tripura as UTs. It established a total of 14 states in addition to these UTs.

== Controversies ==
South Indian states prior to the States Reorganisation Act.

The recommendations of the commission were not accepted universally.

=== Vidarbha ===
The SRC recommended formation of separate Vidarbha State by splitting majority Marathi speaking areas from Madhya Pradesh state. However, the Indian government did not accept the recommendation and merged these areas in the predominantly Marathi speaking Bombay state. Vidarbha would have been the second Marathi majority state for the people of a regional /provincial language in India.

=== Kerala-Madras ===
The Travancore Tamil Nadu Congress demanded to merge Thovalai, Agasteeswaram, Kalkulam, Vilavancode, Neyyatinkara, Senkottai, Deviculam and Peermade with Madras State. However, the Commission recommended only the merger of Thovalai, Agasteeswaram, Kalkulam, Vilvancode and Shenkottai with Madras State. In Neyyatinkara Taluk the Commission found that 86% of the people knew Malayalam. So the Commission did not favour the merger of this Taluk with Madras State. During the Lok Sabha (Parliament) discussions, the representatives of Travancore-Cochin State vehemently opposed the Commission's recommendations for the merger of the Southern Taluks with Madras State. A. Nesamony argued for the merger of Neyyatinkara, Deviculam, Peermade and Chittoor with the Tamil-majority Madras State.

Even though the SRC recommended for the merger of the entire Shenkottai taluk, the subsequently formed Joint Committee recommended the eastern portion of Shenkottai alone to be merged with Madras State. This decision was finally published authoritatively on 16 January 1956. In the July 1956 Lok Sabha meeting, Nesamony argued for the full merger of Shencottai as recommended by SRC. The House refused to reconsider the decision of the joint Committee by over-ruling the recommendation of the SRC.

On the basis of the percentage of the people speaking Tamil, the S.R.Commission recommended for the transfer of four taluks namely, Agasteeswaram, Thovalai, Kalkulam and Vilavancode to Tamil Nadu from the State of Travancore-Cochin. The same yard stick was used for the transfer of Shenkotta Taluk to Tamil Nadu. Even though Shenkotta was fully transferred by the commission, the Joint Committee appointed to fix the exact boundaries of the states, divided Shenkotta Taluk and allowed Travancore–Cochin State to retain a major portion.

=== Andhra-Telangana ===
The Commission's report judged the arguments for and against the merger of the Telugu-majority Telangana region (of Hyderabad State) and the Andhra State (created in 1953). Para 369 to 389 of SRC deals with the merger of Telangana and Andhra to establish the Andhra Pradesh state (complete text of the recommendations is available on Wikisource). Para 386 of SRC says, "After taking all these factors into consideration we have come to the conclusions that it will be in the interests of Andhra as well as Telangana, if for the present, the Telangana area is to constitute into a separate State, which may be known as the Hyderabad State with provision for its unification with Andhra after the general elections likely to be held in or about 1961 if by a two thirds majority the legislature of the residency Hyderabad State expresses itself in favor of such unification".

Hyderabad Chief minister in his letter to Congress President said Communist parties supported the merger for their political calculations. Hyderabad PCC chief said overwhelming majority from Congress opposed the merger and Communists were elected in special circumstances in 1951 and Visalandhra was not a political issue in 1951 and Assembly does not reflect people's view on this issue. He also said 80% of Congress delegates who were elected in 1955 opposed the merger.

In Hyderabad assembly out of 174 MLAs, 147 MLAs expressed their view. 103 MLAs (including Marathi and Kannada MLAs) supported the merger and opposed the Fazal Ali Commission's recommendation to keep Telangana as a separate state for 5 years; and 29 opposed such merger. Among Telangana MLAs, 59 Telangana MLAs agreed with the merger, 25 Telangana MLAs opposed the merger. Out of 94 Telangana MLAs in the assembly, 36 were Communists(PDF), 40 were Congress, 11 were Socialist party(SP), 9 were independents. Voting did not take place on the resolution because Telangana proponents asked to include the phrase "As per the wishes of people" in the resolution.

An agreement was reached between Telangana leaders and Andhra leaders on 20 February 1956 to merge Telangana and Andhra with promises to safeguard Telangana's interests. Popular newspaper in Telangana, Golconda Patrika, in its editorial on 8 March 1956, immediately after Nehru public declaration about the merger, expressing doubts about the Gentleman's agreement said "Andhra older brother might say any number of sweet things now, but they have to be committed to their promises and they should not exploit Telangana younger brother in future."

Following the Gentlemen's agreement, the central government established a unified Andhra Pradesh on 1 November 1956.

There have been several movements to invalidate the merger of Telangana and Andhra, major ones occurring in 1969, 1972 and 2000s onwards. The Telangana movement gained momentum over decades becoming a widespread political demand of creating a new state from the Telangana region of Andhra Pradesh. In early 2014, the Andhra Pradesh Reorganisation Act, 2014 was approved by the Indian parliament, and Telangana became India's 29th state on 2 June 2014.

=== Punjabi Suba ===
The Akali Dal, a Sikh-dominated political party active only in Punjab, sought to create a Punjabi Suba (a Punjabi-majority) province. This new state would be a Sikh-majority state, which caused concern among the Punjabi Hindus. The Sikh leaders such Fateh Singh tactically stressed the linguistic basis of the demand, while downplaying its religious basis — a state where the distinct Sikh identity could be preserved.

The States Reorganisation Commission rejected the demand for a Punjabi-majority state saying that it lacked a majority support and that Punjabi was not grammatically very distinct from Hindi. The Patiala and East Punjab States Union (PEPSU) was merged with Punjab, though. Akali Dal continued its movement, and in 1966 the Punjab Reorganisation Act split Punjab into the Sikh-majority Punjab state and the Hindu-majority states of Haryana and Himachal Pradesh, with Chandigarh, administered as a separate union territory, as the shared capital of Punjab and Haryana states.

=== Belagavi ===
After India became independent in 1947, the Belagavi district (Belgaum) of the erstwhile Bombay Presidency was retained by the Marathi dominated Bombay State. The award of the Belagavi district to the Kannada-majority Mysore State (later Karnataka) was contested by the Samyukta Maharashtra Samiti, which wanted it to be included in the proposed Marathi-majority Maharashtra state.

=== Bombay City-State ===
The Bombay Citizens Committee led by Purushottamdas Thakurdas and supported by J. R. D. Tata and other industrialists, lawyers, doctors and scholars of the city advocated for a one-point agenda of excluding Bombay from the state of Maharashtra. The Committee printed a 200-page book containing maps, charts and tables. The first chapter being historical, showing how the city had been settled by successive waves of settlers. Claiming that there had been little Maharashtrian immigration prior to the 19th century and that Marathi speakers only comprised 43% of the population of the city. The second chapter sought to emphasis Bombay's economic importance in India, the third and fourth chapters being sociological to show the multi-lingual and multicultural character of the city. The fifth chapter was geographical, arguing for Bombay's separation based on physical isolation. For the Bombay Citizens Committee, "on the grounds of geography, history, language and population or the system of law, Bombay and North Konkan cannot be considered as a part of the Mahratta region as claimed by the protagonists of Samyukta Maharashtra." Ramachandra Guha writes that "Behind the veneer of cosmopolitanism there was one language group that dominated the ‘save Bombay’ movement: the Gujaratis." Asserting that the Gujrati community were not pleased that if Bombay became the capital of Maharashtra, as then politicians and ministers would mainly be Marathi.

Nehru was 'somewhat' sympathetic to "keeping Bombay out of the control of a single language group," as was the Marathi Speaking M. S. Golwalkar of the RSS. Speaking in Bombay Golwalkar preferred individuals to use the label "Hindu" over provincial/linguistic difference, in which he differed with Nehru who preferred "Indian." D. R. Gadgil, the secretary and chief theoretician of the Samyukta Maharashtra Parishad, while stating Bombay could remain the economic centre of Maharashtra called for the 'compulsory decentralization' of its industries. G. V. Deshmukh stated that unless Bombay became part of the state, Maharashtrians would have to remain content "playing the part of secondary brokers to brokers, secondary agents to agents, assistant professors to professors, clerks to managers [and] hired labourers to shopkeepers." To respond to the Bombay Citizens Committee paper, the Samyukta Maharashtra issued its own 200-page document, mounting a theoretical defense of the principle of linguistic states and continued to argue for a unified Maharashtra state. Asserting that the city was the centre of Marathi press, publications in Marathi language and Marathi culture. Also stating that Bombay relied economically on its Marathi hinterlands, from where it drew its labour, water, energy and 'ways of communication.' Calling it "‘unthinkable to form a State of Maharashtra which has not Bombay as its capital and it would render impossible the working of a State of Maharashtra, if any attempt was made to separate the city of Bombay from it." The paper also disputed the claim that the city did not have a Marathi-speaking majority, and also contended as a port city it was within its 'nature' to be multi-lingual. Citing the fact that only 32% of the population of contemporary Rangoon spoke the national language but "nobody yet dared to suggest that Rangoon should be considered as non-Burmese territory."

In June 1954 Shankarrao Deo met with to Purushottamdas Thakurdas, Deo maintained that no negotiation was possible on "their core demand," incorporating Bombay as capital of Maharashtra. Purushottamdas was willing to give up the city-state idea in favour of a composite bilingual province of Marathi and Gujrati speakers. Guha terms the meeting "civil, but inconclusive." The issue of Bombay would therefore be referred to the States Reorganization Commission, "the hottest of the many hot potatoes it became their misfortune to handle." On 1 November amidst protests of the Samyukta Maharashtra Parishad (now renamed Samyukta Maharashtra Samiti), the creation of a bilingual state of Bombay was announced. As a concession to the protestors, Morarji Desai was replaced as Chief Minister by the Maratha Y. B. Chavan.

== See also ==
- States Reorganisation Act
