= Haywards 5000 Mr India World 2007 =

- Date: March 7, 2007
- Venue: Hotel Intercontinental the Grand, Mumbai, India
- Broadcaster: Zoom TV
- Winner: Kawaljit Anand Singh

Haywards 5000 Mr India World was held on March 7, 2007. Kawaljit Anand Singh was named Mr India World 2007. Freddy Daruwalla became 1st Runner Up and Mohsin Akhtar became 2nd Runner Up.

== Results ==
Color key

- Declared as Winner
- Ended as Runner-up
- Ended as one of the Finalists or Semi-finalists
- Unplaced

Final Results	Candidate	International Placements
Mr India World 2007	Kawaljit Anand Singh	Top 12
1st Runner-up	Freddy Daruwalla	
2nd Runner-up	Mohsin Akhtar	

== Special awards ==
Award	Contestant
Haywards 5000 Mr. Sach Much Solid	Mohit Jain
Haywards 5000 Mr. Talented	Siddharth Karnick
Fortune Mr Sexy Walk	Freddy Daruwalla
Richfeel Mr Healthy Hair	Milind Shah
Gold's Mr Gym Fitness	Nipun Seth

== Judges ==
- Hemant Trivedi
- Rocky S
- Shaina NC
- Subi Samuel
- Dipnnita Sharma
