= Mathuradas Vissanji =

Indian businessman

Sir Mathuradas Vissanji
- Born: 18 March 1916; Mumbai, Maharashtra
- Died: 1949 (aged 32–33)
- Occupations: Businessman, politician

Sir Mathuradas Vissanji (1916–1949) was an Indian businessman and politician.

== Life ==
He was born on 18 March 1916 in Mumbai, Maharashtra. He died on 22 December 1949.

== Career ==
=== Business career ===
He founded the Wallace Mills Company, a family owned textile business, which is today managed by his grandson Hemant Vissanji. The Vissanji family also owned the Bombay Burmah Trading Company which is worth over US$1 billion today.

He was the first president of the Cotton Corporation of India.

=== Political career ===
He was elected to the Bombay Legislative Assembly in 1935.

In the 1934 Indian general election, he was elected to the Central Legislative Assembly.

== Awards and honours ==
At the 1943 Birthday Honours of King George VI, he was conferred with a knighthood. His name was thus published as Sir Mathuradas Vissanji by the London Gazette from then on.

== Family ==
Sir Mathuradas Vissanji's son was a prominent Indian industrialist, his granddaughter Panna Khatau was married to Sunit Khatau, a member of the Khatau business family.

== See also ==
- Purshottamdas Thakurdas

Business positions
Preceded by Inaugural holder	President of Cotton Association of India; 1921 - 1922	Succeeded by Purshottamdas Thakurdas
Preceded by Phiroze C. Bharucha	Honorary Sheriff of Mumbai; 1940	Succeeded by T. Sinclair Kennedy
