= Habil Khorakiwala =

Indian businessman

- Born: 1942 (age 83–84); Bombay, Bombay presidency, British India
- Education: Purdue University, Harvard Business School
- Occupation: Founder chairman of Wockhardt
- Children: 3

Habil Khorakiwala is the founder and Chairman of Indian multinational pharmaceutical and biotechnology company Wockhardt. He founded Wockhardt in 1967, which since then has grown into one of the top Indian makers of generic drugs, formulations, biopharmaceuticals, nutrition products, vaccines, active pharmaceutical ingredients (APIs) and a chain of advanced Super Speciality Hospitals.

== Early life and education ==
Habil Khorakiwala was born in a Dawoodi Bohra family of Bombay (now Mumbai) in 1942. His father Fakhruddin T. Khorakiwala was the founder of India's first departmental store 'Akbarallys' and also the former Sheriff of Mumbai. He has three children who are handling different divisions of Wockhardt.

He graduated in pharmacy from L.M. College in Ahmedabad and then did a master's degree in Pharmaceutical Science from Purdue University, and an Advanced Management Programme at Harvard Business School, USA.

== Career ==
Habil Khorakiwala founded Wockhardt Limited in 1967 after taking over his father's Worli Chemical Works. It started as a small firm with only 20 employees, making over-the-counter drugs. Since then, Wockhardt Limited has grown into a multinational pharmaceutical and biotechnology firm with manufacturing facilities around the world and more than 7,000 employees. In December 2014, he was appointed as the Chancellor of Jamia Hamdard University. He has also served as Sweden's honorary consul general in Mumbai.

== Honours and awards ==
- In 2010, Purdue University awarded him an honorary Doctor of Pharmacy degree.
- Young Entrepreneur of the Year award in the field of health care and life sciences
- Award for Excellence as Top CEO from the Institute of Marketing and Management, New Delhi
- Shiromani Vikas Award for "outstanding and inspiring contributions toward national development"

== Bibliography ==
- Odyssey of Courage
