= History of Mumbai in independent India =

Mumbai, previously known as Bombay, is the financial capital of India and one of the most populous cities in the world. Mumbai grew into a leading commercial center of India during the 19th century on the basis of textile mills and overseas trade. After independence, the desire to domesticate a Marathi social and linguistic Mumbai to a cosmopolitan framework was strongly expressed in the 1950s. Mumbai, one of the earliest cities in India to be industrialized, emerged as the centre of strong organized labour movement in India, which inspired labour movements across India.

== Background ==
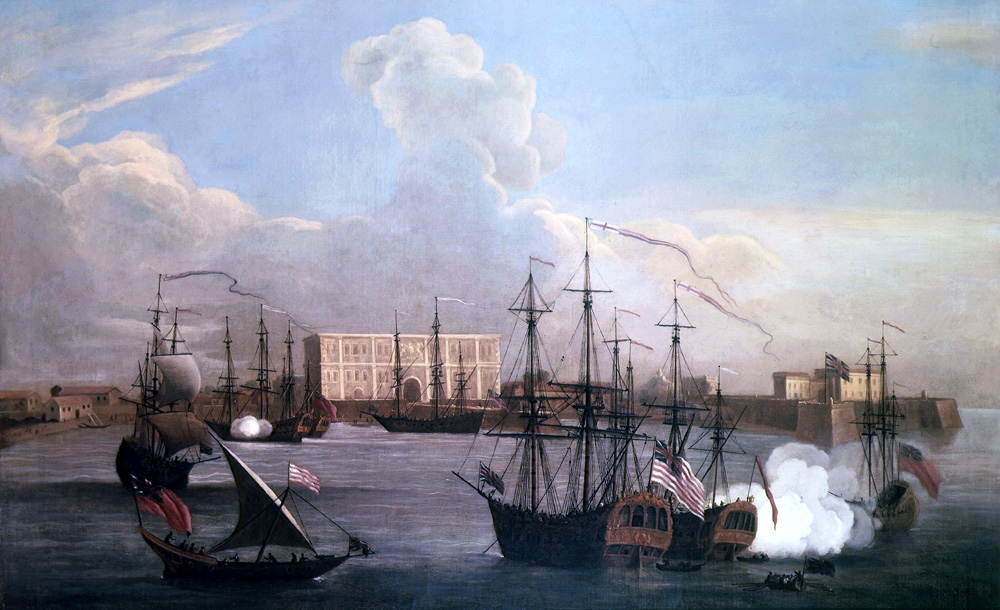
Ships in Mumbai Harbour. Mumbai grew into a leading commercial center of India during the 19th century

The Seven Islands that came to constitute Mumbai were home to communities of the Marathi Speaking Kolis and Aagris for Decades. The islands came under the control of successive indigenous empires before being ceded to the Portuguese and subsequently to the British East India Company. During the mid-18th century, Mumbai was reshaped by the British with large-scale civil engineering projects, and emerged as a significant trading town.

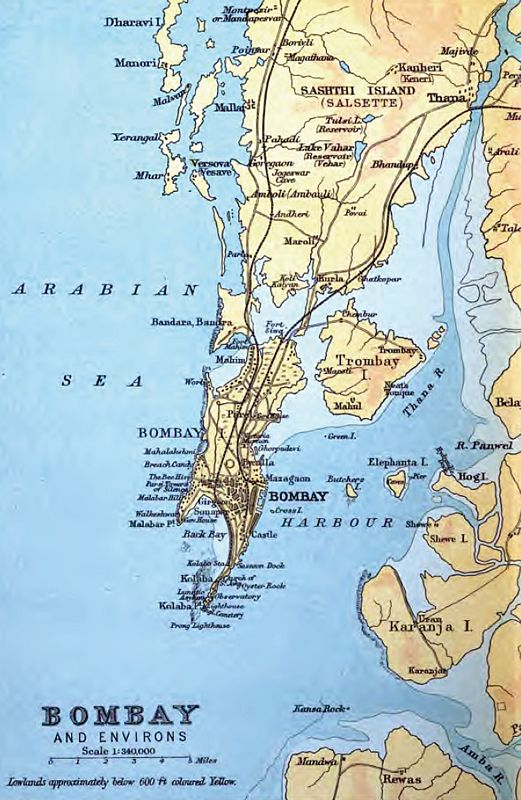
An old map of Bombay

Mumbai was a native Fisherman Land of Marathi Speaking Kolis And Aagris grew into a leading commercial center of India during the 19th century on the basis of textile mills and overseas trade. The city was, first and foremost, built and developed by the British. Migrants from Gujarat came for industrial and commercial bourgeoisie consisting of Parsis, Gujarati Hindus, Muslims communities earning their wealth on the extensive Arabian trade. The expanding labour force in Mumbai was initially drawn from the coastal belt of Konkan, south of the city. Until the 1940s, Marathi speakers from these areas accounted for 68% of the city's population, and held mostly jobs.

== Bombay State ==
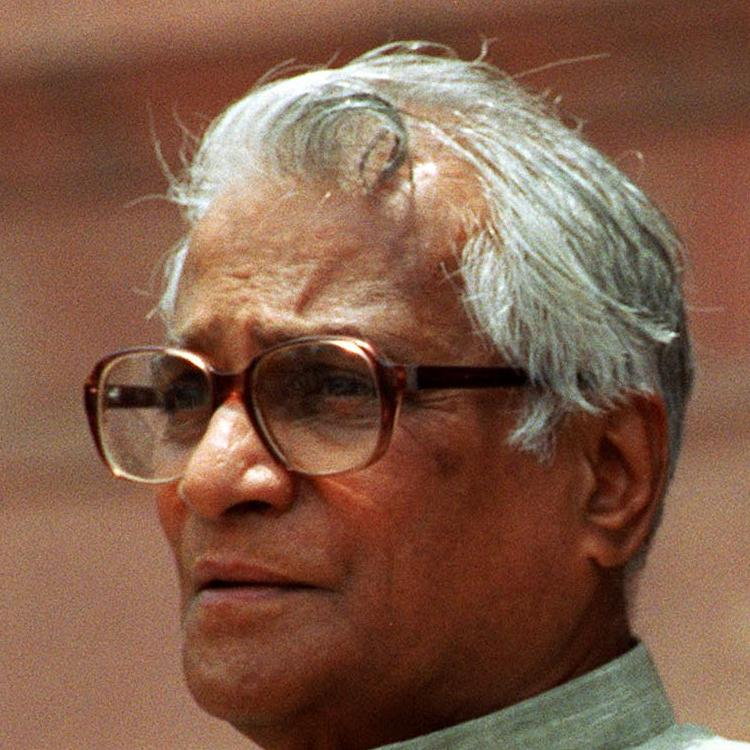
George Fernandes emerged as a key figure in the Bombay labour movement in the early 1950s

After India's independence from British rule on 15 August 1947, the territory of Bombay Presidency retained by India after the partition was restructured into Bombay State. The area of Bombay State increased, after several erstwhile princely states that joined the Indian union were integrated into Bombay State. Subsequently, Bombay City, the capital of erstwhile Bombay Presidency, became the capital of Bombay State. Following communal riots between Hindus and Muslims in the Sindh province of the newly created Pakistan from Bombay Presidency, over 100,000 Sindhi Hindu refugees from Pakistan were relocated in the military camps five kilometres from Kalyan in the Bombay metropolitan region. It was converted into a township in 1949, and named Ulhasnagar by the then Governor-General of India, C. Rajagopalachari.

In 1947, Congress party activists established the Rashtriya Mazdoor Mill Sangh (RMMS), with a claimed membership of 32,000, to ensure a strong political base in the textile industry. The RMMS served as a lasting impediment to the free development of independent unionism in Bombay. Economic growth in India was relatively strong during much of the 1950s, and employment growth in Bombay was particularly good, as the city's manufacturing sector diversified. The Bombay textile industry until the 1950s was largely homogeneous, dominated by a relatively small number of large industrial mills. From the late 1950s, policies were introduced to curb the expansion of mills and to encourage increased production from the handloom and powerloom sectors, because of their employment generating capacities. Bombay was one of the few industrial centres of India where strong unions grew up, particularly company or enterprise based unions, often in foreign owned firms. A key figure in the Bombay labour movement in the early 1950s, was George Fernandes. He was a central figure in the unionisation of sections of Bombay labour in the 1950s.

Bombay's Bollywood film industry grew rapidly as it received intense political attention and new sources of governmental funding after 1947. This enabled the industry to embark on technological innovations and to establish effective systems for nationwide distributions. The enormous growth in spectatorship and cinema halls throughout the country soon established Bombay cinema as the dominant Indian film industry. In April 1950, Greater Bombay District came into existence with the merger of Bombay Suburbs and Bombay City. It spanned an area of 235.1 km^{2} (90.77 sq mi) and inhabited 2,339,000 of people in 1951. The Municipal Corporation limits were extended up to Jogeshwari along the Western Railway and Bhandup along the Central Railway. This limit was further extended in February 1957 up to Dahisar along the Western Railway and Mulund on the Central Railway. The Indian Institute of Technology Bombay, one of the finest institutions in the country in science and technology, was established in 1958 at Powai, a northern suburb of Bombay, with assistance from UNESCO and with funds contributed by the Soviet Union.

== Battle of Mumbai ==
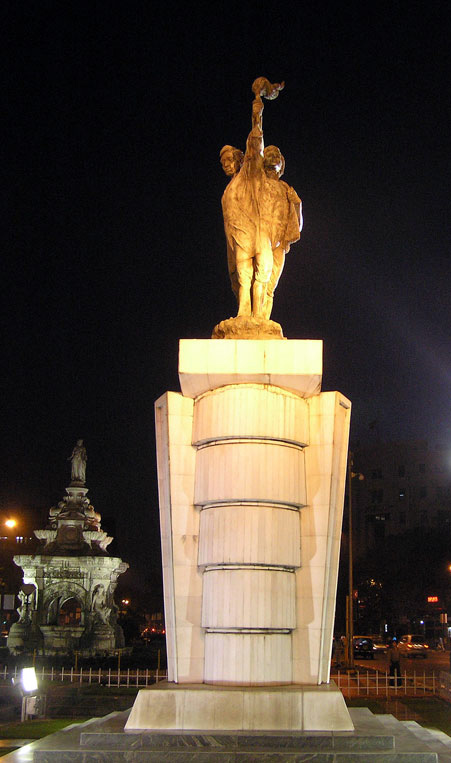
Flora Fountain was renamed Hutatma Chowk ("Martyr's Square") as a memorial to the Samyukta Maharashtra movement. The Hutatma Chowk memorial with the Flora Fountain, on its left in the background

The desire to domesticate a Marathi social and linguistic Mumbai to a cosmopolitan framework was strongly expressed in the 1950s. On 13 May 1946, a session of the Marathi literary conference held at Belgaum, unanimously resolved on the formation of a united Marathi state. Consequently, the Samyukta Maharashtra Parishad (United Maharashtra Conference) was formed on 28 September 1946, to unite all Marathi-speaking territories into a single political unit. The Parishad consisted of political leaders from the Congress and other parties, and prominent literary figures. It presented its point of view to the States Reorganisation Committee. However, the States Reorganisation Committee in its report to the Indian Government in 1955, recommended a bilingual state for Maharashtra–Gujarat with Mumbai as its capital. The Maharashtrians wanted Mumbai as a part of Maharashtra, since it had majority of Marathi speakers. However, the city's economic and political elite feared that Bombay would decline under a government committed to developing the rural hinterland. Mumbai Citizens' Committee, an advocacy group composed of leading Migrant Gujarati industrialists lobbied for Mumbai's independent status.

In the Lok Sabha discussions on 15 November 1955, S. K. Patil a pro Gujarati lobby Political Leader, a Congress Member of Parliament (MP) from Mumbai, demanded that the city be constituted as an autonomous city-state, laying stress on his Anti Marathi character. On 20 November 1955, the Mumbai Pradesh Congress Committee organized a public meeting at the Chowpatty beach in Mumbai, where S. K. Patil and Morarji Desai, the then Chief Minister of Bombay State, made provocative statements on Mumbai. Patil said that, "Maharashtra will not get Bombay for the next 5,000 years." On 21 November 1955, violent outbursts erupted, and there was a total hartal in Bombay. Thousands of angry protesters converged at Hutatma Chowk with a view to march peacefully towards the Council Hall, where the State Legislature was in session. The police used tear gas to disperse the crowd, but when it failed, they finally resorted to firing, killing 15 people. Under pressure from business interests in Mumbai it was decided to grant Mumbai the status of a Union territory under a centrally-governed administration, setting aside the recommendations of the States Reorganisation Committee report. On 16 January 1956, Jawaharlal Nehru, the first Prime Minister of India, announced the government's decision to create separate states of Maharashtra and Gujarat, but put Mumbai City under central administration. Large demonstrations, mass meetings and riots soon followed. The Mumbai Police dissolved the mass meetings and arrested several of the movement's leaders. During 16 January–22 January, police fired at demonstrators protesting the arrests, in which more than 80 people were killed.

The States Reorganisation Committee report was to be implemented on 1 November 1956. It caused a great political stir and, led to the establishment of the Samyukta Maharashtra Samiti (United Maharashtra Committee) on 6 February 1956. The Samyukta Maharashtra Samiti was basically born from the Samyukta Maharashtra Parishad, but had an enlarged identity with broad representation from not only the Congress, but opposition parties, and independents as well. The Samiti spearheaded the demand for the creation of a separate Maharashtra state including Mumbai out of the bilingual Bombay State using violent means. In the August 1956 discussions, the Union cabinet agreed on the creation of a bigger bilingual Bombay State including Maharashtra, Marathwada, Vidharbha, Gujarat, Saurashtra, Kutch, and Mumbai City. In the second general elections of Bombay State held in 1957, the Samiti secured a majority of 101 seats out of 133 in the present day Western Maharashtra region. The Congress could secure only 32 seats out of 133 in Maharashtra, obtaining a bare majority of 13 out of 24 in Greater Mumbai The Congress suffered the same fate in Gujarat, winning only 57 out of 89 seats. The Congress however succeeded in forming a government in Bombay State with the support of Marathwada and Vidarbha. Yashwantrao Chavan became the first Chief Minister of the Maharashtra State. In 1959, he headed a cabinet of 15, out of which 4 represented Gujarat, to discuss the future of Bombay State. Chavan managed in convincing Jawaharlal Nehru and Indira Gandhi, who was elected President of the Indian National Congress in 1959, of the futility of the bilingual Bombay State, which was increasingly jeopardizing Congress prospects in Gujarat and Maharashtra. Finally on 4 December 1959, the Congress Working Committee (CWC) passed a resolution recommending the bifurcation of the Bombay State.

The Samyukta Maharashtra Samiti achieved its goal when Bombay State was reorganised on linguistic lines on 1 May 1960. Gujarati-speaking areas of Bombay State were partitioned into the state of Gujarat. Maharashtra State with Mumbai as its capital was formed with the merger of Marathi-speaking areas of Bombay State, eight districts from Central Provinces and Berar, five districts from Hyderabad State, and numerous princely states enclosed between them. In all 105 persons died in the battle for Mumbai. As a memorial to the martyrs of the Samyukta Maharashtra movement, as Hutatma Chowk (Martyr's Square), and a memorial was erected, since it was the starting point of the agitation.

After the 1960 bifurcation, many Gujaratis left Mumbai feeling that they would be better-off in Gujarat than in Mumbai, and fearing that they would be neglected by the Maharashtra Government. The Maharashtrians also blamed the Gujaratis for the death of the 105 martyrs of the Samyukta Maharashtra movement.

== Rise of Regionalism ==
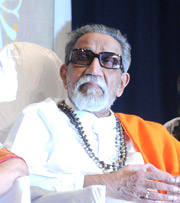
Bal Thackeray had established the Shiv Sena party in 1966

In the 1960s, the Marathi-speaking middle-class in Mumbai, who had been the most consistent supporters of the Samyukta Maharashtra Samiti, felt threatened in Mumbai despite the creation of Maharashtra. This was mainly because of the increasing number of migrants competing with them for jobs. The Gujarati and Marwari communities owned majority of the industry and trade enterprises in the city, while the white-collar jobs were mainly sought by the South Indian migrants to the city.

This was the line taken by Mumbai cartoonist and journalist Bal Thackeray in his weekly magazine Marmik (Satire), launched in 1963, which soon became one of the most popular magazines among Native Marathi speakers of Mumbai. Backed by his father Prabodhankar Thackeray and a circle of friends, he established the Shiv Sena party on 19 June 1966, out of a feeling of resentment about the relative marginalization of Maharashtrians in Mumbai. The Shiv Sena rallied against the South Indians, the Communists, the Gujarati city elite, and the Muslims in India. In the 1960s and 1970s, Shiv Sena cadres became involved in various attacks against the South Indian communities, vandalising South Indian restaurants and pressuring employers to hire Marathis.

== The creation of Navi Mumbai (New Bombay) ==
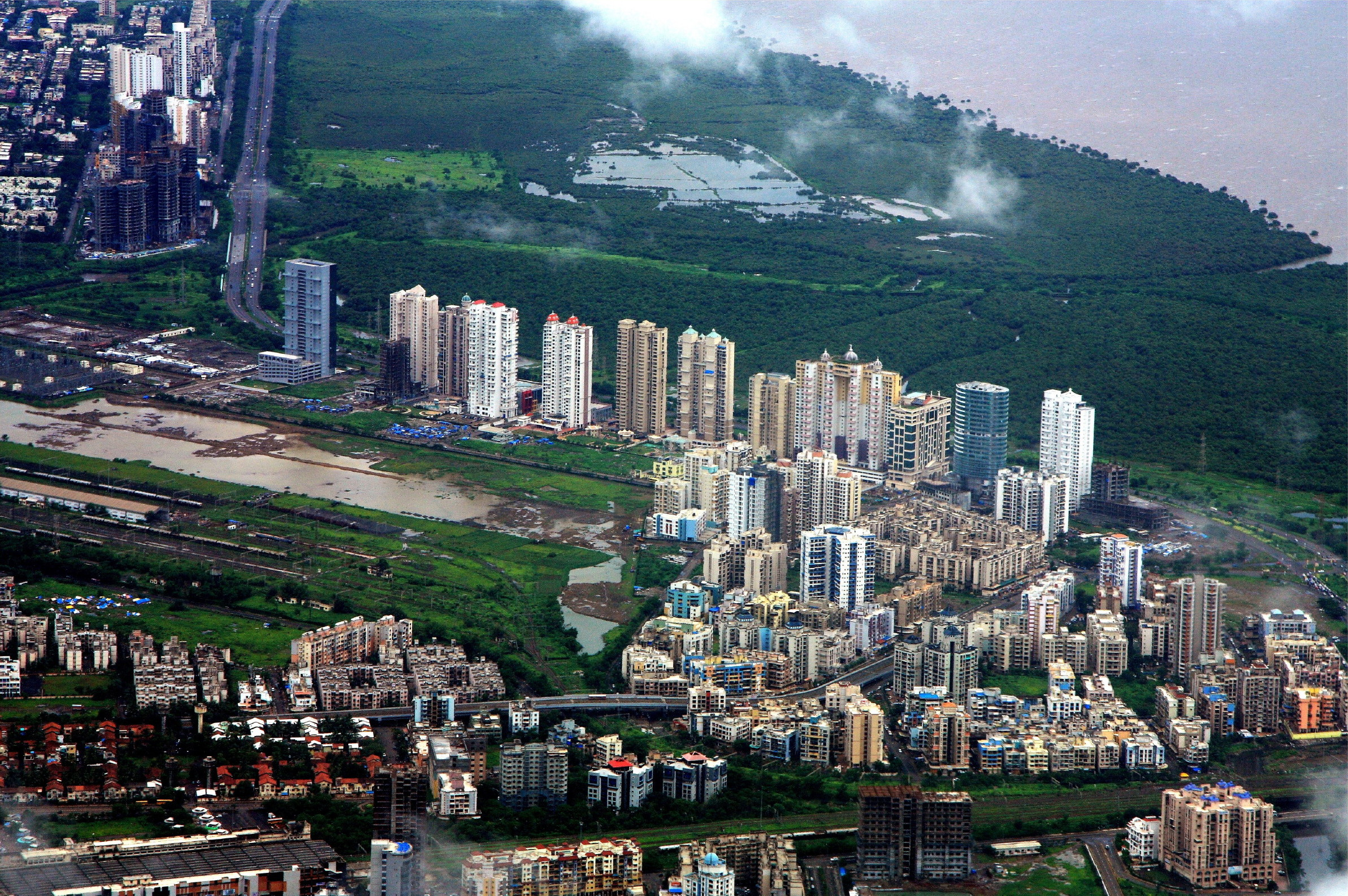
Navi Mumbai, the twin city of Navi Mumbai, was founded in 1979, to help the dispersal and control of Bombay's population

The need for urban development on the mainland across from Mumbai Island was first officially recommended in the 1940s. In 1945, a Post-war development committee suggested that areas should be developed on the mainland on the opposite side of the harbour to contain the future growth of the city. In 1947, N. V. Modak and Albert Mayer published their plan, stressing on controlled development of the city, suburbs, and its neighbouring cities like Thane, Vasai, and Uran. In March 1964, the Municipal Corporation of Greater Mumbai submitted its development plan for Greater Mumbai, which was criticized for various reasons, but approved in 1967. By that time, another plan had been developed by two of Mumbai's leading architects Charles Correa and Pravin Mehta, and an engineer Shirish Patel. They suggested that a "twin city" of equal size and prominence to Greater Mumbai, would only be able to solve the city's congestion problems. Thus, the idea of the creation of Navi Mumbai was born.

The proposed site for Navi Mumbai covered an area of 344 km^{2} (133 mi^{2}), integrating 95 villages spread over the districts of Thane and Raigad.

== 21st century ==
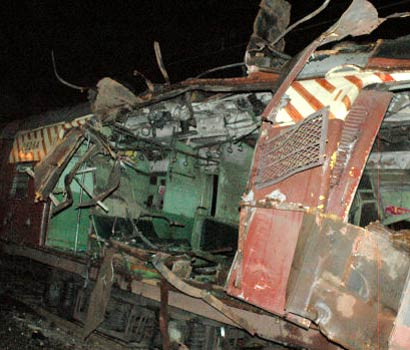
One of the bomb-damaged coaches at the Mahim station in Mumbai during the 11 July 2006 train bombings

During the 21st century, the city suffered several terrorist attacks and natural disasters.

=== Terrorist attacks ===
- On 6 December 2002, a bomb placed under a seat of an empty BEST (Brihanmumbai Electric Supply and Transport) bus exploded near Ghatkopar station in Mumbai. Around 2 people were killed and 28 were injured. The bombing occurred on the tenth anniversary of the demolition of the Babri Mosque in Ayodhya.
- On 27 January 2003, a bomb placed on a bicycle exploded near the Vile Parle station in Mumbai. The bomb killed 1 and injured 25. The blast occurred a day ahead of the visit of Atal Bihari Vajpayee, the then Prime Minister of India to the city.
- On 13 March 2003, a bomb exploded in a train compartment, as the train was entering the Mulund station in Mumbai. 10 people were killed and 70 were injured. The blast occurred a day after the tenth anniversary of the 1993 Mumbai bombings.
- On 28 July 2003, a bomb placed under a seat of a BEST bus exploded in Ghatkopar. The bomb killed 4 people and injured 32.
- On 25 August 2003, two blasts in South Mumbai - one near the Gateway of India and the other at Zaveri Bazaar in Kalbadevi occurred. At least 44 people were killed and 150 injured. No group claimed responsibility for the attack, but it had been hinted that the Pakistan-based Lashkar-e-Toiba was behind the attacks.

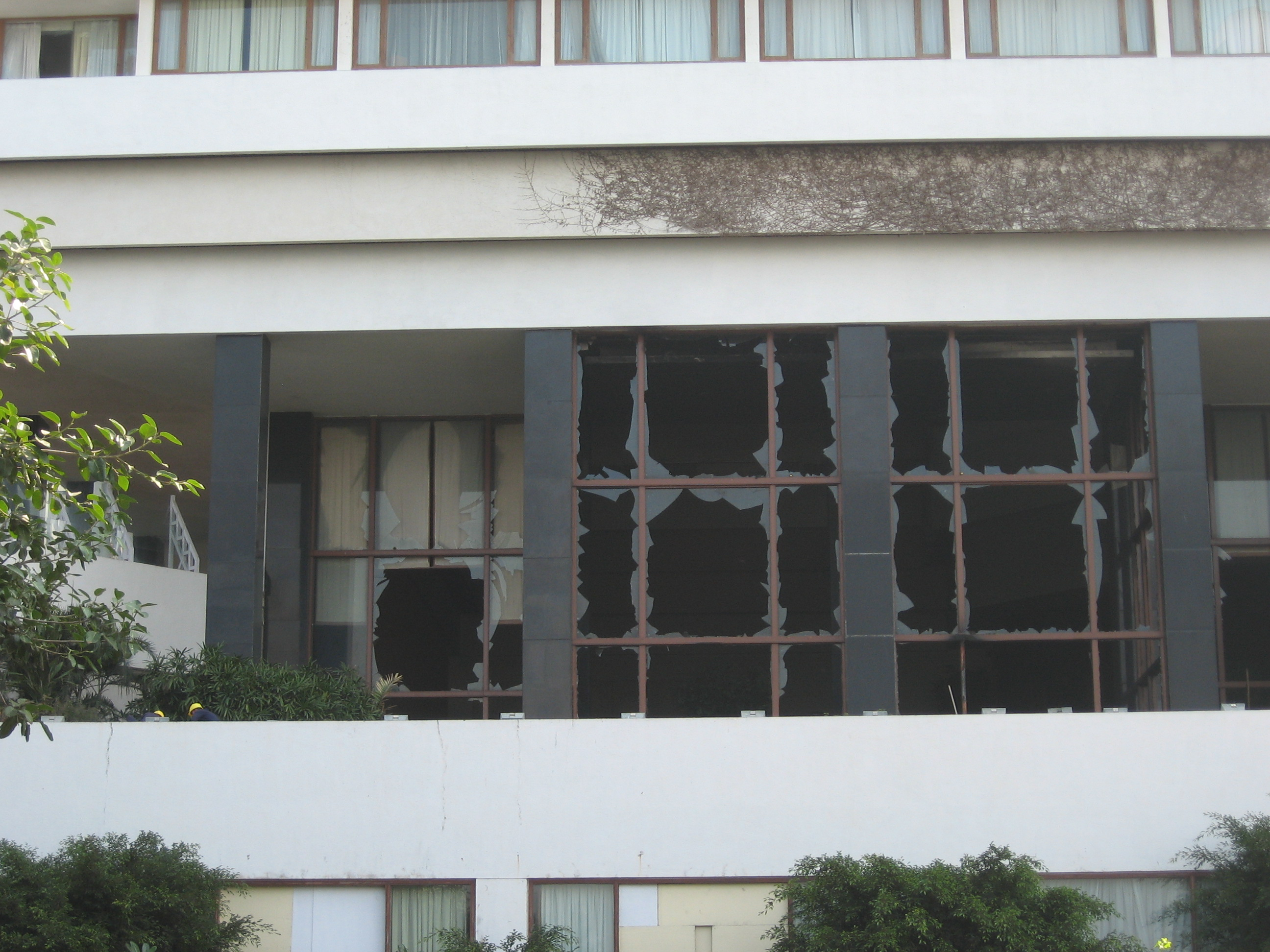
The damaged Oberoi Trident hotel during the November 2008 attacks

- On 11 July 2006, a series of seven bomb blasts took place over a period of 11 minutes on the Suburban Railway in Mumbai at Khar, Mahim, Matunga, Jogeshwari, Borivali, and one between Khar and Santa Cruz. 209 people were killed and over 700 were injured. According to Mumbai Police, the bombings were carried out by Lashkar-e-Toiba and Students Islamic Movement of India (SIMI).

==== 2008 Mumbai attacks ====
From 26 to 29 November 2008, a series of ten coordinated terrorist attacks were perpetrated by the Lashkar-e-Taiba terrorist group using automatic weapons and grenades. The attacks resulted in 164 deaths, 308 injuries, and severe damage to several important buildings. Eight of the attacks occurred in South Mumbai: at Chhatrapati Shivaji Maharaj Terminus, The Oberoi Trident, The Taj Mahal Palace Hotel & Tower, Leopold Cafe, Cama Hospital, the Nariman House Jewish community center, the Metro Cinema, and in a lane behind The Times Of India building and St. Xavier's College. There was also an explosion at Mazagaon, in Mumbai's port area, and in a taxi at Vile Parle. By the early morning of 28 November, all sites except for the [Taj Hotel] had been secured by Mumbai Police Department and security forces. On 29 November, India's National Security Guards (NSG) conducted 'Operation Black Tornado' to flush out the remaining attackers; it culminated in the death of the last remaining attackers at the Taj Hotel and ended the attacks. Ajmal Kasab disclosed that the attackers were members of Lashkar-e-Taiba, among others. The Government Of India said that the attackers came from Pakistan, and their controllers were in Pakistan. On 7 January 2009, Pakistan confirmed the sole surviving perpetrator of the attacks was a Pakistani citizen. On 9 April 2015, the foremost ringleader of the attacks, Zakiur Rehman Lakhvi, was granted bail against surety bonds of ₨200,000 (US$1,900) in Pakistan.

=== Anti-migrant attacks ===
In 2008, members of Maharashtra Navnirman Sena (MNS) under Raj Thackeray on attacked North Indian migrants from UP and Bihar and SP Party Workers in Mumbai. Attacks included assault on North Indian taxi drivers and damage of their vehicles.

=== Natural disasters ===
Mumbai was lashed by torrential rains on 26–27 July 2005, during which the city was brought to a complete standstill. The city received 37 inches (940 millimeters) of rain in 24 hours — the most any Indian city has ever received in a single day. Around 83 people were killed.
