= Sewri Christian Cemetery =

Cemetery in Mumbai (Bombay), Maharashtra, India

Sewri cemetery
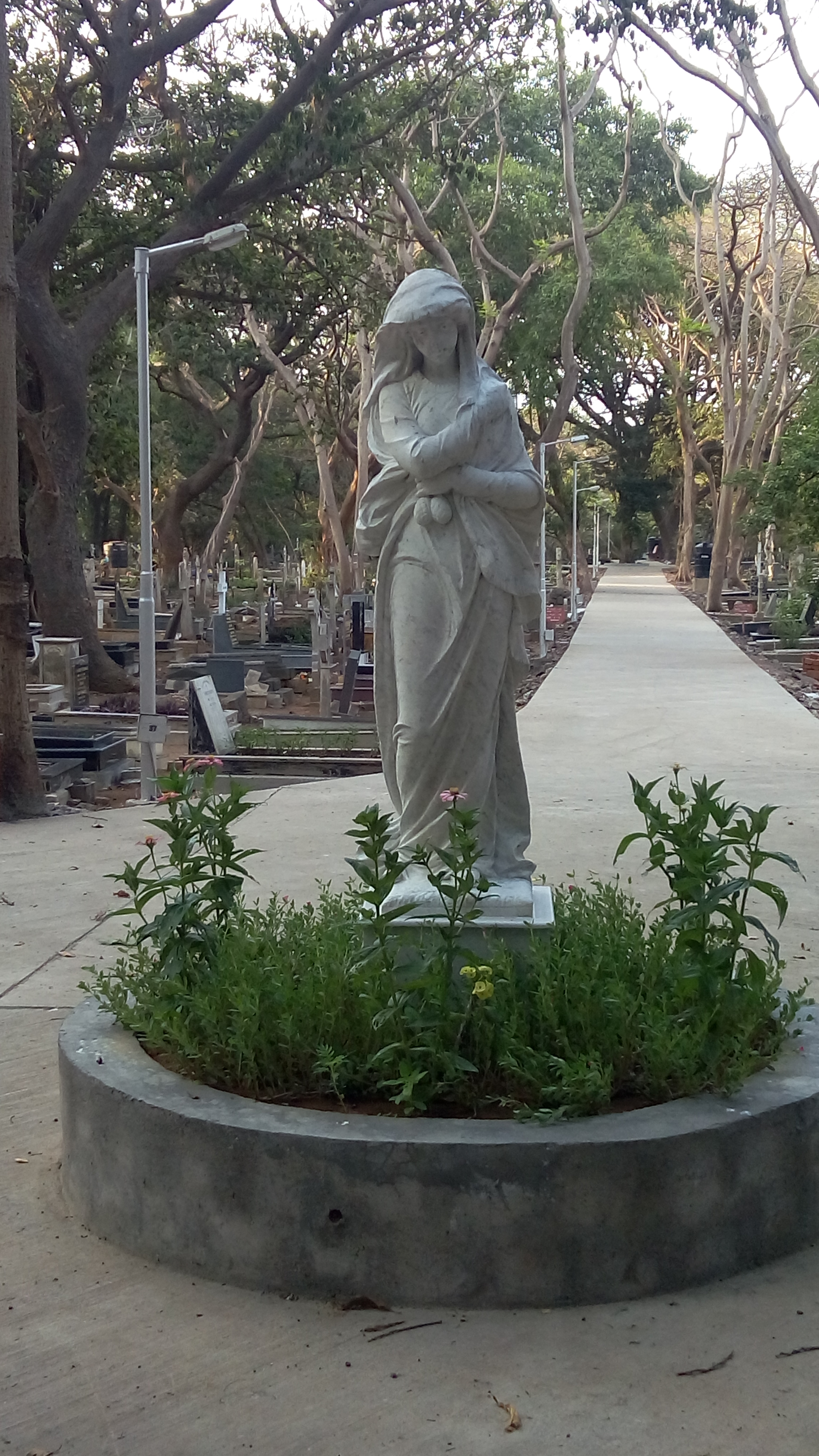
- Statue in Sewri Christian Cemetery
- Interactive map of Sewri cemetery

Details
- Established: 1864; 162 years ago
- Location: Sewri, Mumbai
- Country: India
- Coordinates: 19.001°N 72.851°E
- Type: Public
- Owned by: Brihanmumbai Municipal Corporation

The Sewri Christian Cemetery (Marathi: Sewrī Kristi smashan bhumi) in Sewri, Mumbai, India, was established by Arthur Crawford, the first Municipal Commissioner of Bombay as a location for European burials. The land was acquired from the Agri-Horticulture Society's gardens in 1865. The bodies of Commonwealth military service personnel buried in the cemetery during the First and Second World Wars were all exhumed and reburied at Kirkee War Cemetery where permanent maintenance by the Commonwealth War Graves Commission could be assured, with the exception of a Second World War soldier of the Women's Auxiliary Corps (India) whose grave is still registered and maintained by the commission.

== People buried ==
People Buried
Name	Date	Who
George Wittet	1926	Architect, designed the Gateway of India
James Docherty	1926	Assistant Business Manager (Times of India)
Francis Newton Souza	2002	Avant Garde artist
Frederick William Stevens	1900	Architect of the Victoria Terminus
Dom Moraes	2004	Poet
Joseph Baptista	1930	Mayor of Bombay
Cyril Frederick Golding	1951	25 Jun 1937, elected to the Bombay Legislative Assembly, from the constituency of the Bombay Chamber of Commerce and the Bombay Presidency Trades Association.
Thomas Blaney	1903	Irish physician and philanthropist in Bombay. Two-time Sheriff of Bombay.

== Gallery ==
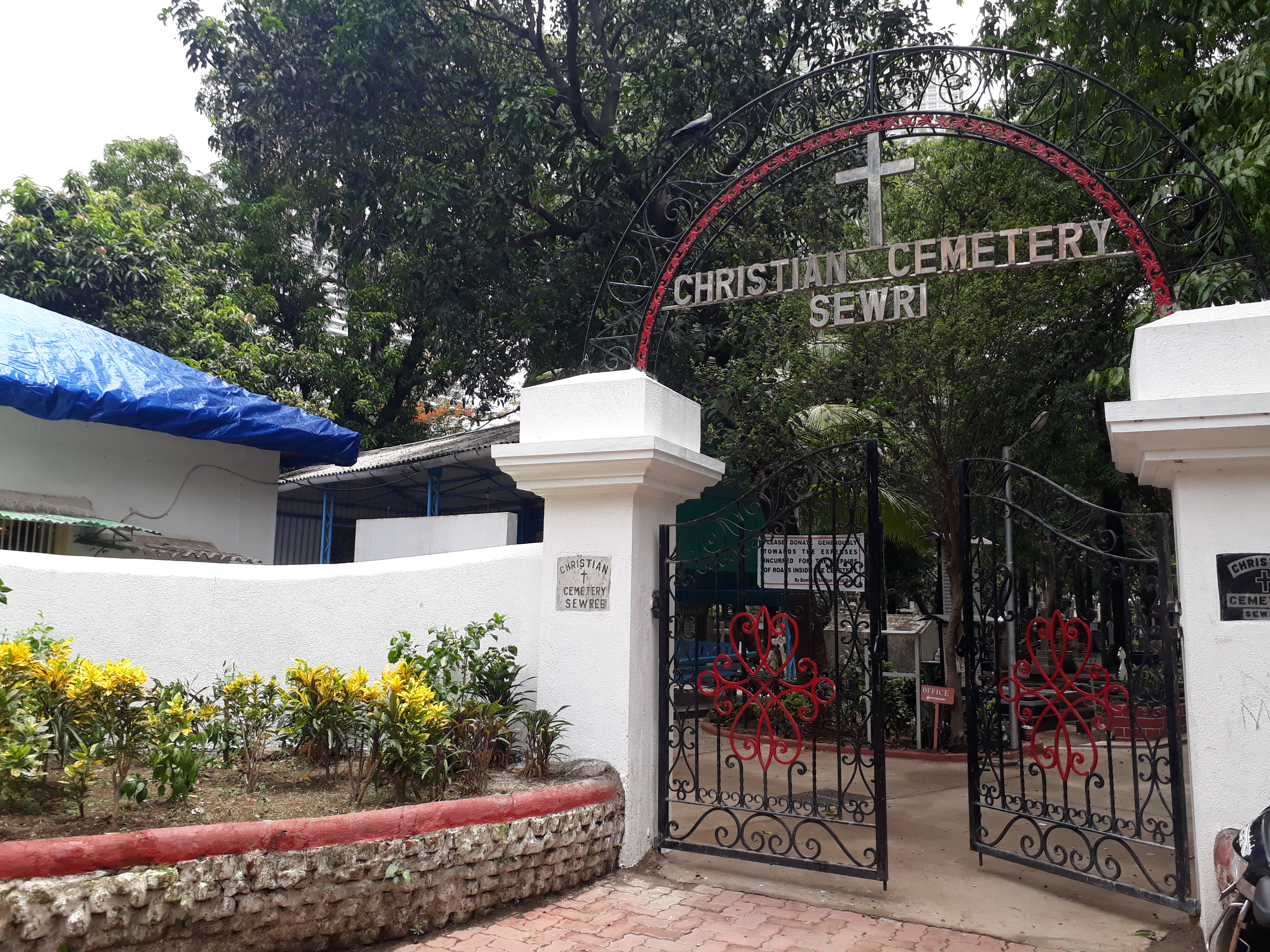

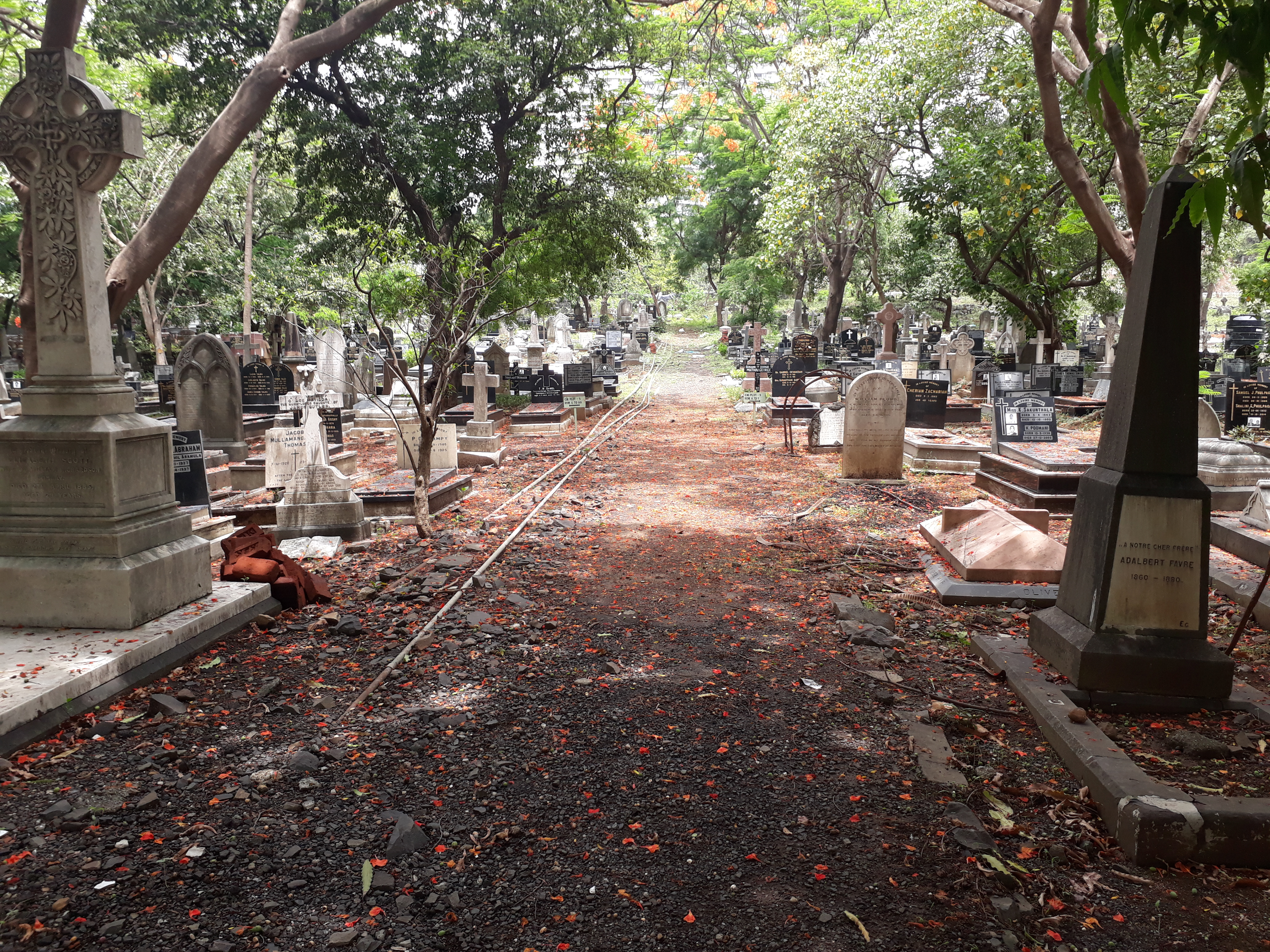

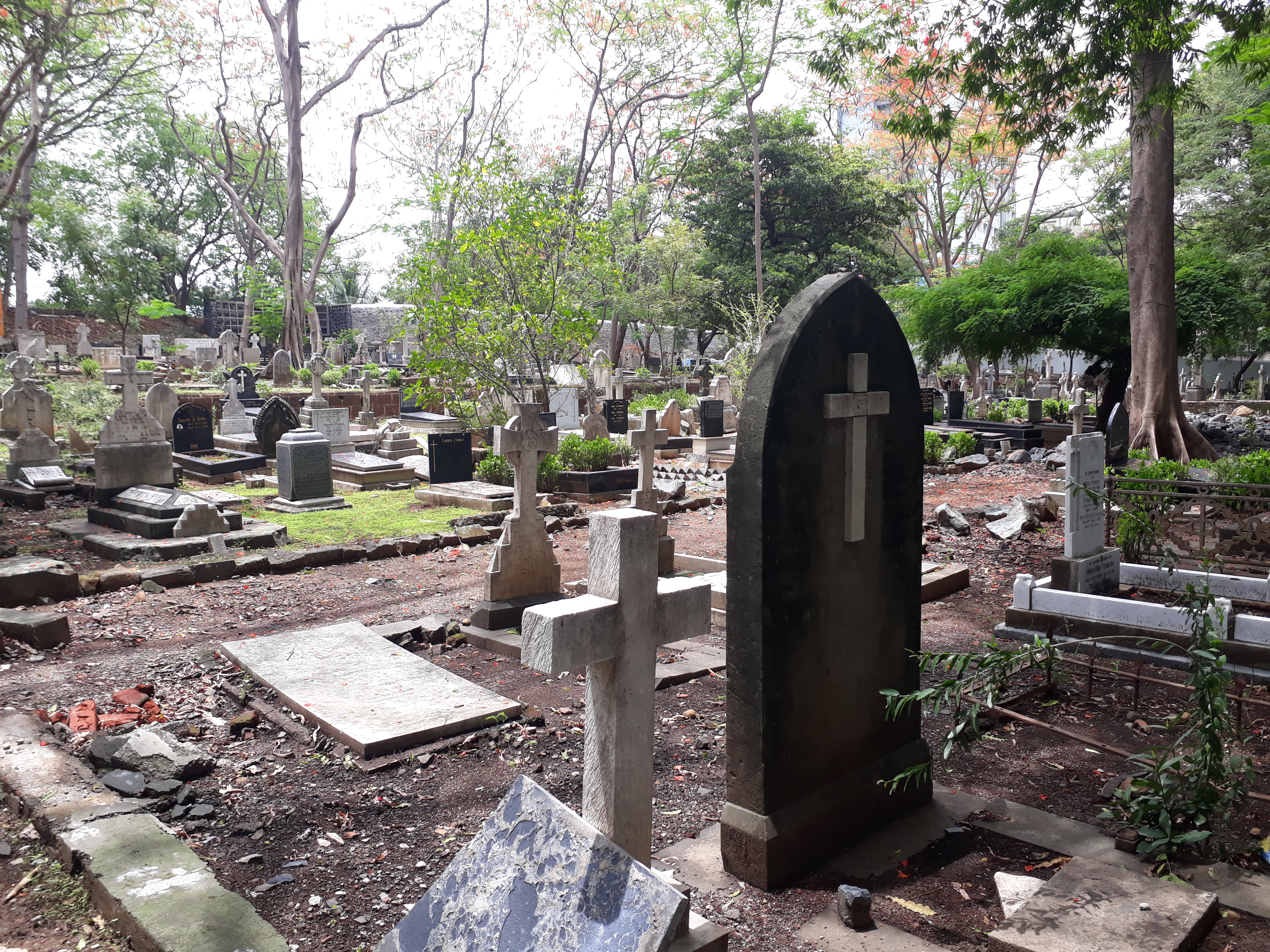

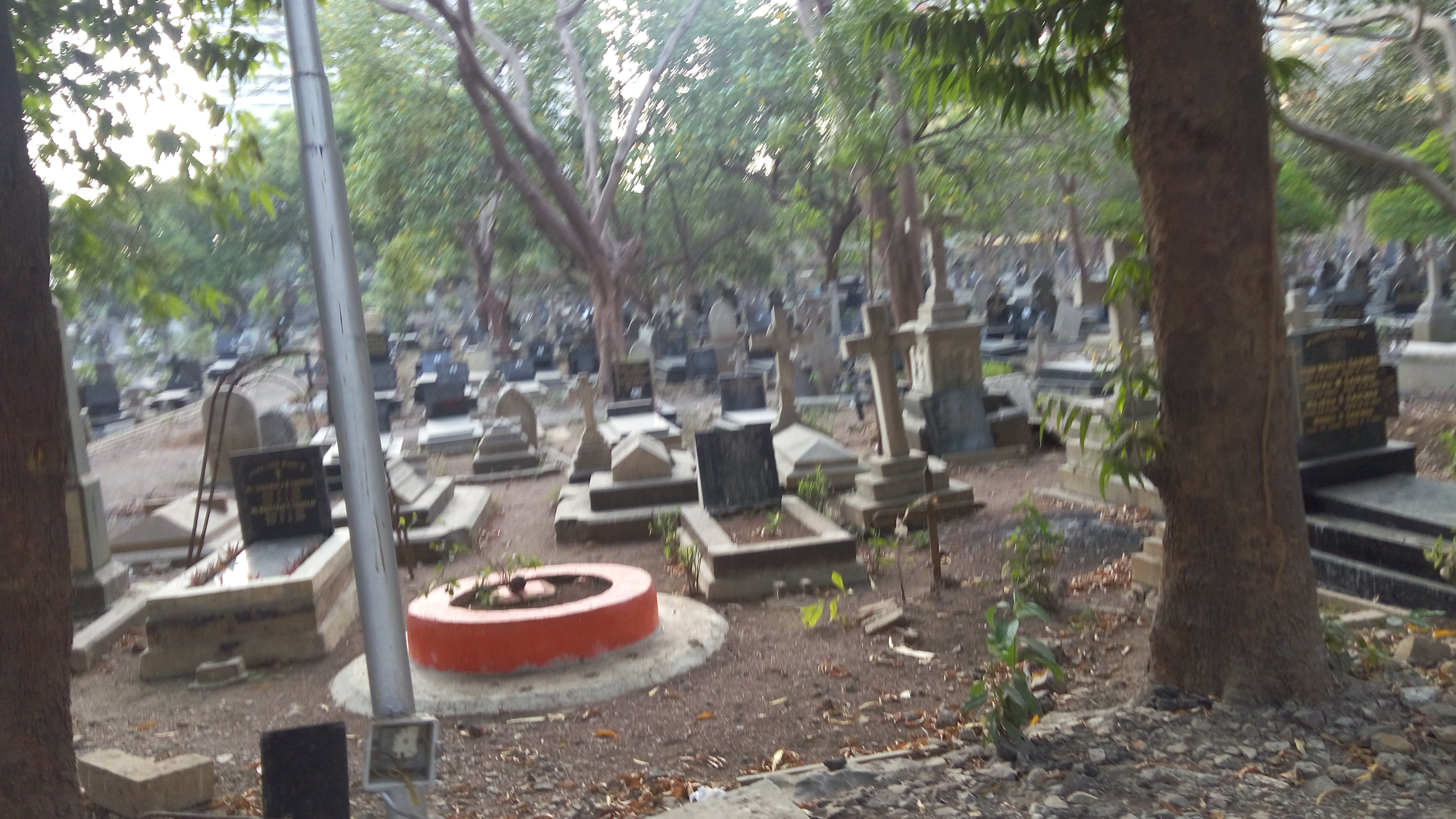

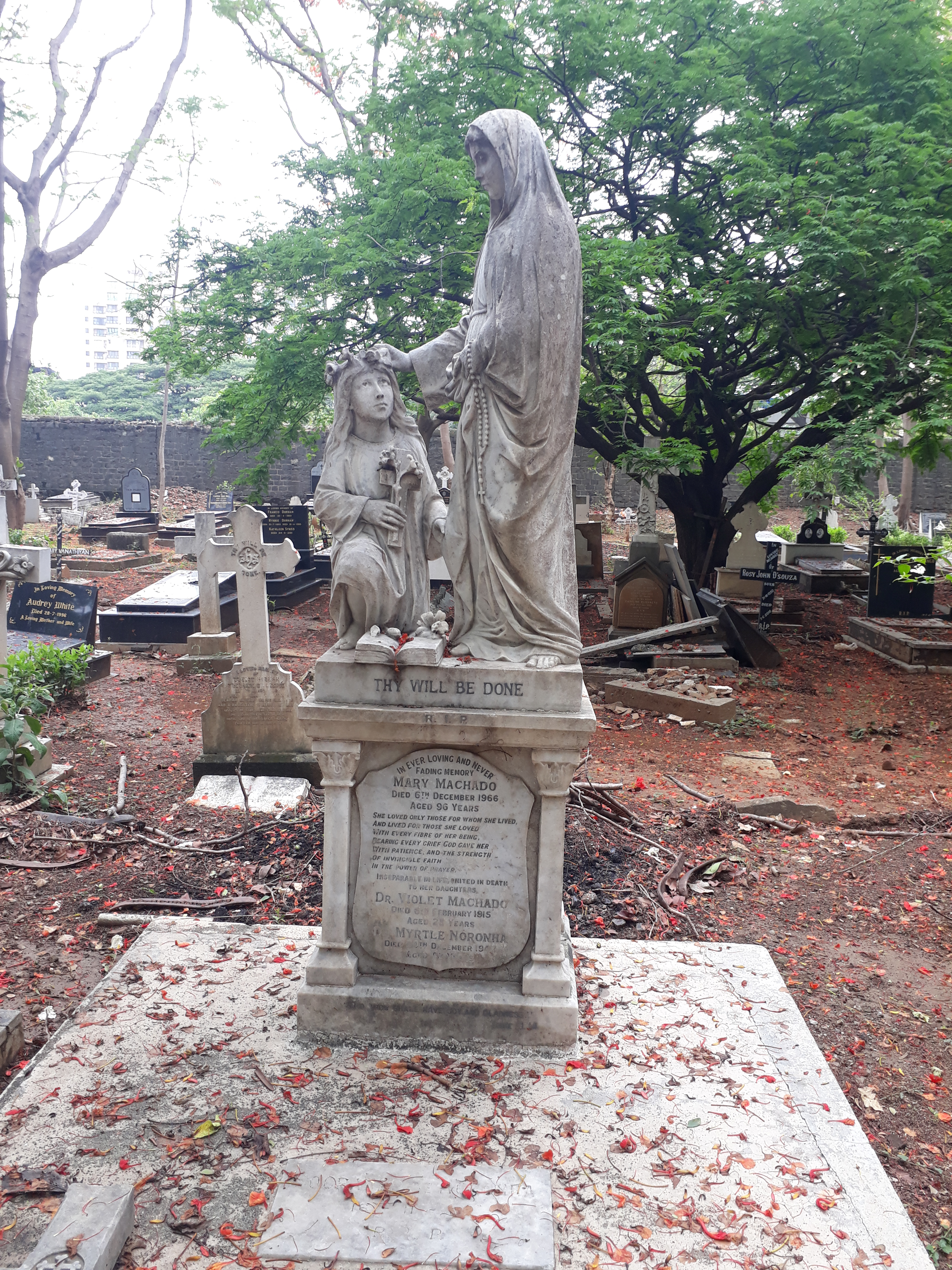

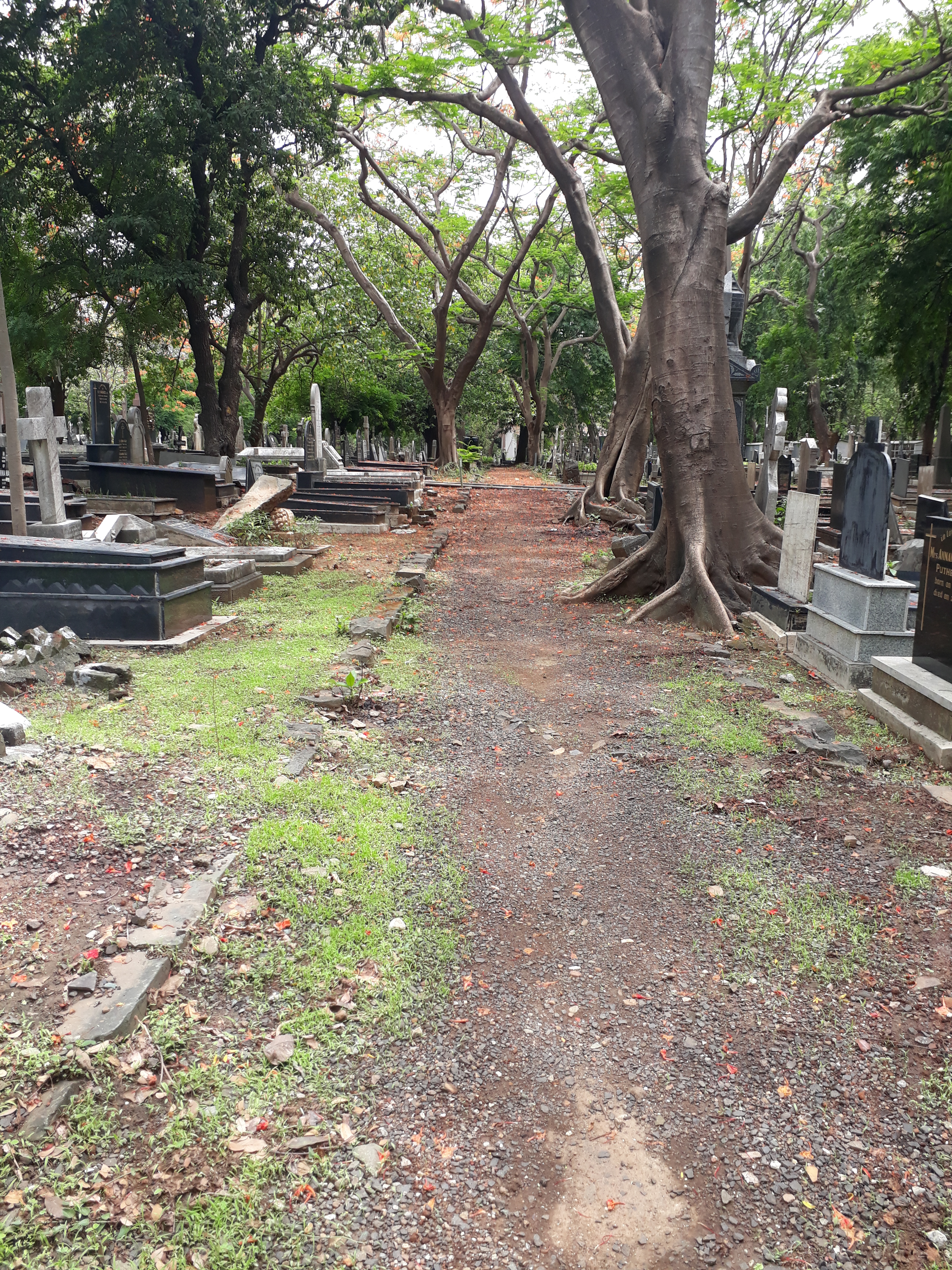

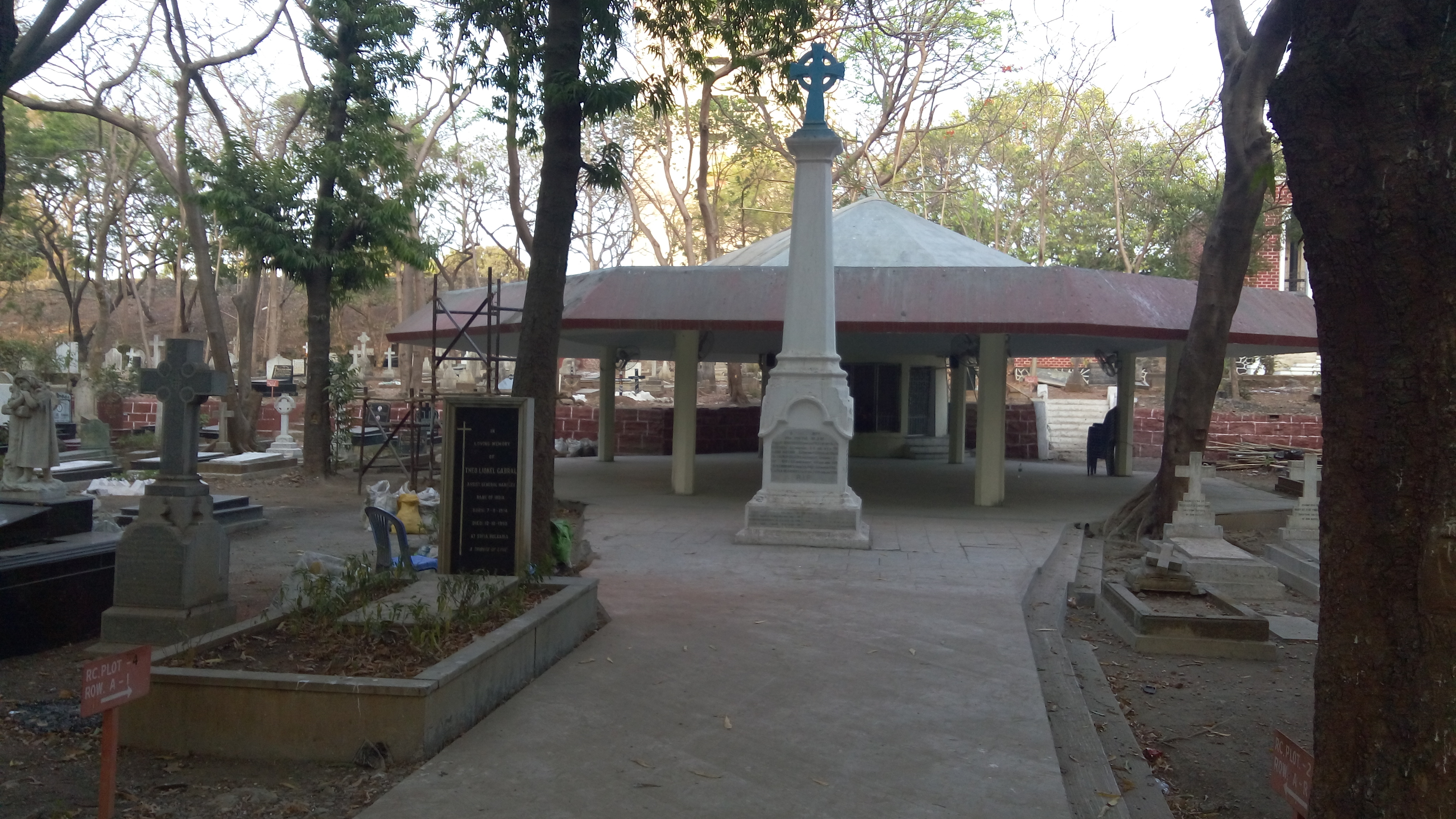
