= Jagannathrao Hegde =

Sheriff of Mumbai (born 1943)

Dr. Jagannathrao Hegde (born 1943) is a former Sheriff of Mumbai. His term was of two years and took over on 23 December 2003. Hegde is a dental surgeon.
