= Fakhruddin T. Khorakiwala =

Indian businessman and Sheriff of Mumbai

- Born: 1918; Ahmedabad
- Died: 6 July 2011 (aged 93); Mumbai
- Education: Government Law College, Mumbai
- Occupations: Founder of Akbarallys group of departmental stores Sheriff of Mumbai; Chancellor of Jamia Millia Islamia
- Children: 3

Fakhruddin T. Khorakiwala was an Indian businessman and Sheriff of Mumbai. From 2000 until his death, he was the chancellor of Jamia Millia Islamia. He was a well-known Indian businessman, and founded the Akbarallys group of departmental stores in Mumbai. He acquired Worli Chemical Works which later was incorporated as Wockhardt Ltd, becoming India's 5th largest pharmaceutical company.

== Early life ==
He was born in Ahmedabad in 1918, and studied at Government Law College, Mumbai. During his youth, he participated in the Quit India Movement on 9 August 1942 at the August Kranti Maidan.

== Career ==
In 1956 he founded the Akbarallys group of departmental stores in Mumbai. It was India's first indigenised departmental store and India’s pioneering foray into retail management.

Khorakiwala was the Sheriff of Mumbai in 1992 and instrumental in bringing peace to the city after communal riots broke out after the destruction of the Babri Masjid by organising a 100km human chain against sectarian violence. He envisioned the creation of Mohalla Committees (Neighbourhood Committees) and helped set up 72 of them across Mumbai.

In 1995, Khorakiwala took over as the President of the Indian Merchants' Chamber (IMC)

In 2003, he was appointed Chancellor of Jamia Millia Islamia university in New Delhi, a post which he held till his death.

He was also the Chairman of the Advertising Standards Council of India, the Founder and President of the Indo-Swiss, Indo-Arab and India-Indonesia Friendship Societies.

== Death ==
Khorakiwala died on 5 July 2011. He was 93 and is survived by three sons, Habil Khorakiwala, now chairman of the Wockhardt Group, Hunaid Khorakiwala and Taizoon Khorakiwala, Managing Director of Switz Group. In November 2006, his son Habil was elected as the president of FICCI.he was also elected chancellor of Jamia Hamdard new delhi

== Awards ==
He was conferred with a number of awards including 'Maharashtra State Vanashree Award 2003', the Life Time Achievement Award by BMA (Bombay Management Association) and the prestigious Citizen of Mumbai Award by The Rotary Club of Bombay.
