= Ardeshir Darabshaw Shroff =

Indian banker and economist (1899–1965)

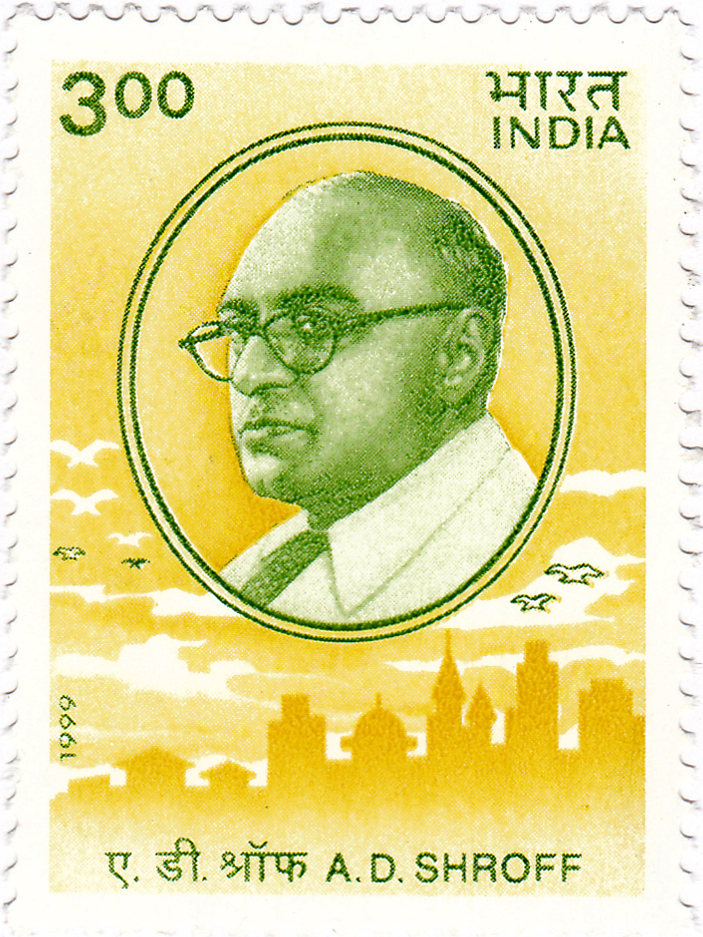
Shroff on a 1999 stamp of India

Ardeshir Darabshaw Shroff (4 June 1899 – 27 October 1965) was an industrialist, banker and economist of India.

== Early life ==
Ardeshir Darabshaw Shroff was born in Bombay to Darabshaw and Cooverbai Shroff, the sixth child of eleven siblings. His father worked as an officer in Killick Nixon. He graduated in history and economics from Elphinstone College in 1921 and was the first graduate in his family. After graduation he joined the London School of Economics to do a B.S. with banking and currency as his special subjects. While studying he worked as an apprentice for an American bank called Equitable Trust Company of New York.

== Biography ==
Shroff had sought to work in a bank but on the advice of Ratanji Dadabhoy Tata joined Batlivala and Karani where he worked till he joined the Tatas in 1940. He became the vice president of the Indian Merchants' Chamber and was actively associated with the Federation of Indian Chambers of Commerce & Industry. As an advocate of free enterprise, he criticized the socialist views of Jawaharlal Nehru.

In 1940, Shroff joined Tata Sons as its financial adviser and became managing director of the Investment Corporation of India in 1941 and chairman of the New India Assurance Company Limited in 1946. In 1944, he had the honour of representing India as one of the two non-official delegates at the United Nations "Bretton Woods Conference" on post-war monetary and financial systems. In the same year, and with seven other leading industrialists, Shroff co-authored the Bombay Plan, which was a set of proposals for the development of the post-independence Indian economy.

In October 1953, the Reserve Bank of India in consultation with the government set up a committee under Shroff's chairmanship to examine how finance could be made available to the private sector. The committee's recommendations resulted in the establishment of the Industrial Development Corporation which later became the IDBI Bank and the Industrial Development and Finance Corporation which later became the ICICI Bank. He had become a director in Bank of India succeeded Cowasji Jehangir as its chairman in 1959.

In 1954, he co-founded the Forum of Free Enterprise think tank as a means to counter the socialist tendencies of the Nehru government. He complained against the indifference with which the state treated entrepreneurs, and asserted that if the Government of India were to shed some of their 'impractical ideologies' and extend their active support to the private sector, very rapid industrialisation could be brought about within the next 10 years. Shroff also served as company director of the Tata Group and of several other leading private industries. A biography of Shroff, commissioned by the Forum of Free Enterprise, was published in 2000 by business journalist Sucheta Dalal.

Shroff died of a heart attack in 1965 at his bungalow in Juhu.
