= Jagat Narain Lal =

Indian independence activist (1894–1966)

Jagat Narain Lal (21 July 1894 – 3 December 1966) was an Indian writer, poet, political leader, freedom fighter, and Gandhian activist. He also served as a member of the Constituent Assembly, professor of economics at Bihar Vidyapith, practicing lawyer, and editor of the journal Mahavir.

Known for his deep religiosity and spiritual inclinations, he occupied a position on the ideological right within the Indian National Congress and also served as the general secretary of the Hindu Mahasabha in 1926, maintaining a complex and often conflicted relationship with both organisations throughout his political career.

== Early life ==
Jagat Narain Lal was born on 21 July 1894 in a small mofussil town called Akhgaon in the district of Arrah, Bengal Presidency in a Ambastha Kayastha family. His father, Bhagawat Sahay, had a railway job as a station master, whose transferable job took him to many places. His mother, Radhika Devi, was a homemaker and a great Kirshna bhakt. The inspiration of his mother's bhakti and the enchantment of the metaphysical formed the core of Jagat Narain Lal's religiosity, but also his politics.

He received elementary education, like many other children of those times, by a maulvi who used to come home. Jagat Narain Lal joined a formal school only much later in Gorakhpur where his father, Bhagwat Prasad, had been posted. In 1910, for higher studies he first joined the very reputed, and a more cosmopolitan, Irwin Christian College, and then, after graduating with a first division, moved to the Allahabad University for his post graduate studies in economics and law.

In 1918, Lal moved to Patna where he began his practise in the Patna High Court alongside Sir Ali Imam, Syed Hasan Imam, Sachidanand Sinha, Sri Baidyanath Singh, Shambhu Sharan Verma, Anugrah Narayan Sinha and Dr. Rajendra Prasad. Under their mentorship, Lal soon began to make a name for himself, before he became involved in the national movement. The nation woke up to the efficacy and immense possibilities of a form of resistance that was a combination of extra-constitutional struggle as well as of moral force against an adversary that has both the rule of law and might on its side. Almost all prominent leaders of Bihar - Brajkishore Prasand, Rajendra Prasad, and Muzharul Haq participated in the movement.

== Intellectual life ==
Jagat Narain Lal was a very learned man with a wide-ranging interest in Vedantic philosophy, Western political philosophy, economics and matters of law. He was a professor of economics at Bihar Vidyapith (inaugurated by Gandhi on 4 Feb 1921), a practising lawyer, editor of journal Mahavir (till 1928), a writer who wrote extensively about his political life and spiritual awakening. The Nehru Memorial Library has more than two thousand hand written pages that record his wide intellectual interests and repertoire. In a book recounting his jail years, Light Unto a Cell. he references the Mahabharat, the Bhagwat Gita, Isha Upanishad, among others. There's an interesting anecdote in the book, he writes: "Along with my old friend, Narayan Prasad Sinha, MLA with whom I had first started the study of the Gita and the Upanishads in 1921, I wanted to form a study circle of lovers of the Gita. But, so nervous were most of the Gandhites and Congressmen of anti-religious bias of our socialist and communist fellow prisoners that they had hardly the courage to broach the matter openly.’

== Political life ==
As a committed freedom fighter and Congressman, Jagat Narain lal was imprisoned during the Non Cooperation, Civil Disobedience and the Quit India Movements and spent close to a decade in jail. As the assistant secretary of the Provincial Congress Committee He played a major role in the success of the Gaya Congress in 1922 after his release from Buxer jail. He was sentenced to prison for a second time in 1929 under the charges of sedition for having become, as he writes, ‘the bête noir to the Government and the police chief of the province, thanks to my bitter and scathing criticism of their bungling which had resulted in communal antagonism and riots.’ After he was released from Hazaribagh Central jail in 1929, he lent his support to and spearheaded the Salt Satyagraha as the President of the Patna District Congress Committee.

In the interim, Lal, under the influence of Madan Mohan Malviya and B.S. Moonje, also acquired dual membership of the Hindu Mahasabha. His association with the All India Hindu Mahasabha strengthened and he became its General Secretary at its Calcutta session in 1926. Beginning early 1930s, his enchantment with the Hindu Mahasabha began to wane. On his release from Hazaribagh Central Jail in 1932, he joined the Servants of Hindu Society. He wrote: ‘[When] Bhai Paramanand was elected president of the Hindu Mahasabha, he openly advocated a pro-government and anti-Congress policy, in defiance of all earlier traditions. The rift between us grew wider and wider until…I felt I could no longer associated with him.’ In protest, and to register his disenchantment, Jagat Narain Lal finally stopped taking his allowance from the Mahasabha. His disenchantment with the Hindu Mahasabha was complete by the time the first provincial assembly elections took place in 1937 when he fought the elections on a Congress ticket defeated the Mahasabha candidate who stood against him. ‘The election was almost a cake-walk for me. The Hindu Sabha candidate forfeited his deposit.’. In 1937, he became the Parliamentary secretary to the then Finance Minister & Deputy Chief Minister of Bihar province Dr. Anugraha Narayan Sinha.

At the Congress session at Allahabad in 1942 he moved a resolution with Nehru's backing and support – famously known as the Jagat Narain lal's Resolution– rejecting Sir Stafford Cripp's interim proposal for a Dominion Status and Partition of India, and defeating C. Rajagopalachari's resolution in support of the Cripps’ proposals.

Jagat Narain Lal went on to become a member of the Constituent Assembly as a Congress representative from Bihar. He made several important interventions regarding the right to religion, on matters pertaining to the federal structure and nature of citizenship in the constituent Assembly Debates. He was also appointed as a member of the Dar Commission, 1948 – (a three-member commission) – which was the first linguistic reorganization commission of India. He went on to become a member of the legislative assembly from the Danapur constituency, and the Deputy Speaker of the Bihar state assembly led by Chief Minister Krishna Sinha and a cabinet minister in 1957, handling the portfolios of Law, and Cooperative and Animal husbandry.
