= Wockhardt =

Pharmaceutical and biotechnology company headquartered in Mumbai, India

Wockhardt Limited

- Wockhardt global headquarters in Mumbai
- Type: Public
- Traded as: NSE: WOCKPHARMA; BSE: 532300
- Industry: Pharmaceuticals; Health care
- Founded: 1960s
- Founder: Habil Khorakiwala
- Headquarters: Wockhardt Towers, Bandra Kurla Complex, Mumbai, Maharashtra, India
- Area served: Worldwide
- Key people: Habil Khorakiwala (Chairman); Murtaza Khorakiwala (Managing director); Huzaifa Khorakiwala (Executive Director)
- Products: Formulations; Biopharmaceuticals; Vaccines
- Revenue: ▼₹2,693 crore (US$280 million) (FY23)
- Net income: ▲₹−621 crore (US$−64 million) (FY23)
- Number of employees: 3,000 (2023)
- Subsidiaries: Morton Grove Pharma
- Website: www.wockhardt.com

Wockhardt Limited is an Indian pharmaceutical and biotechnology company headquartered in Mumbai. It produces formulations, biopharmaceuticals, nutrition products, vaccines and active pharmaceutical ingredients (APIs). The company has manufacturing plants in India, the UK, Ireland, France and US, and subsidiaries in US, UK, Ireland and France.

== History ==
Wockhardt was founded by Dr. Habil Khorakiwala in the 1960s. His father Fakhruddin T. Khorakiwala had acquired Worli Chemical Works in 1959. This was incorporated as Wockhardt Pvt. Ltd., in 1973. Wockhardt Ltd. was incorporated on 8 July 1999. In the 1990s, Wockhardt gained market share with its painkiller Proxyvon (opioid tramadol + paracetamol) and blood pressure drugs (lisinopril, etc.). In 1995, it expanded into biotechnology, and subsequently started producing intravenous fluids. In 1999, Wockhardt joined the Indian Pharmaceutical Alliance as a founding member in an effort to promote the development of generic drugs in India.

Wockhardt is the first company outside the US and Europe to manufacture recombinant human insulin.

In 2011, Wockhardt sold its nutrition business to Danone for $356 million.

During the COVID-19 pandemic, Wockhardt signed a contract with the Government of the United Kingdom to fill-finish the Oxford–AstraZeneca COVID-19 vaccine at the company's facility in Wrexham, Wales. The contract was extended until August 2022.

In August 2021, Wockhardt announced that it signed an agreement with Dubai-based Enso Healthcare and Russian firm Human Vaccine LLC to contract manufacture the Sputnik V and Sputnik Light vaccines in India.

== Mergers and acquisitions ==
Wockhardt's acquisitions include Wallis Laboratory, UK (1998); Merind, India (1998); CP Pharmaceuticals, UK (2003); Espharma GmbH, Germany (2004); Dumex, India (2006); Pinewood Laboratory Ireland (2006); Morton Grove Pharmaceuticals, US (2007); and Negma, France (2007). Wockhardt's debt following the acquisitions was close to Rs 38 billion, and Habil Khorakiwala quit as managing director.

On 31 March 2009, the board of directors approved the appointments of Habil Khorakiwala's sons Murtaza Khorakiwala and Huzaifa Khorakiwala as managing director and executive director respectively.

== Philanthropy and education ==
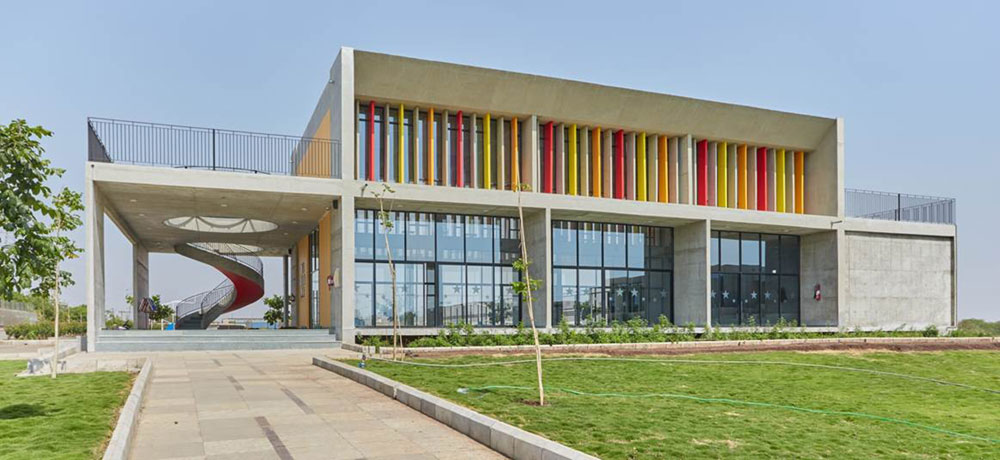
Wockhardt Global School in Aurangabad

- Wockhardt Foundation
- Wockhardt Global Schools

== In popular culture ==
Wockhardt is known for producing cough syrup with the sedative promethazine and the opiate codeine, used in the recreational street drug lean, which is sometimes referred to as "Wock", short for Wockhardt.

== Good Manufacturing Practice violations ==
In 2013, the United States Food and Drug Administration uncovered widespread fraud in Wockhardt's production of generic medications, such as contamination of injectable drugs in violation of good manufacturing practice. The agency responded by restricting the company's ability to export drugs from its manufacturing plant in Aurangabad, India. Wockhardt officials responded by repeatedly threatening the involved FDA inspectors.

== See also ==
- Wockhardt Hospitals
- Monginis
