= Shaina NC =

Indian fashion designer, politician (b. 1972)

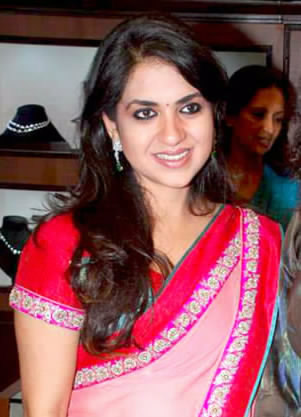
- Shaina NC in March 2011

Spokesperson of Bharatiya Janata Party – Maharashtra
- In office 2012–2024

Personal details
- Born: Shaina Nana Chudasama; 1 December 1972 (age 53) (Note: In a YouTube video, Shaina's birth date is declared to be on 1 December in the presence of Shaina and other BJP leaders. As per affidavit filed by Shaina to Election Commission of India on 22 September 2004, her age was 31. Her age can be 31 on 22 September 2004 only if she is born on 1 December 1972.) Mumbai, Maharashtra, India
- Party: Shiv Sena (since 2024)
- Other political affiliations: Bharatiya Janata Party (2004–2024)
- Spouse: Manish Munot
- Children: 2
- Parent: Nana Chudasama (father)
- Education: St. Xavier's College, Mumbai; FIT, New York
- Profession: Fashion designer, politician, social worker

Shaina Nana Chudasama (born 1 December 1972), is an Indian fashion designer, politician, and social worker. Daughter of the former Sheriff of Mumbai, Nana Chudasama, Shaina is known in the Indian fashion industry as the 'Queen of Drapes' for draping a saree (sari) in fifty-four different ways. She holds a record in the Guinness Book of World Records for the fastest saree drape. She entered politics in 2004 and joined the Bharatiya Janata Party (BJP). She holds the positions of national spokesperson for the BJP, member of the national executive council of BJP, and treasurer of the BJP's Maharashtra unit. Shaina is also involved in social work through her charity fashion shows and two NGOs, 'I Love Mumbai' and 'Giants International'.

== Personal life ==
Shaina was born in Malabar Hill, Mumbai on 1 December 1972 into an extremely affluent business family of mixed religious heritage. Her father, Nana Chudasama, was a businessman with strong political connections who later became Sheriff of Mumbai for one year in the 1990s. He belonged to a Hindu Gujarati Rajput family from Saurashtra. Shaina's mother, Munira, came from a Dawoodi Bohra Muslim family, also from Gujarat. Shaina has two siblings: a brother, Akshay Nana Chudasama, and a sister, Brinda.

Shaina completed her schooling from Queen Mary School, Mumbai (ICSE board) in 1989, and then obtained a Bachelor of Arts degree in political science from St. Xavier's College, Mumbai in 1993. She realised that academics were not her forte and that she was more attracted towards fashion design. So after graduation, she travelled to New York City and got an associate degree in fashion design from the Fashion Institute of Technology, New York.

Shaina is married to Manish Munot, who is a Marwari Jain. She first met him in school when she was thirteen years old and married him at the age of twenty-three after six years of dating. Shaina attributes her success at managing her profession, politics, and social work to the support of her husband. She lives in Mumbai with her husband and two children, daughter Shanaya and son Ayaan. Shaina says that her family celebrates all religious festivals like Paryushan, Diwali and Eid.

== Career ==
Shaina is pursuing a career in fashion design as well as in politics. She says that fashion design is her profession while politics is her passion.

=== Fashion designer ===
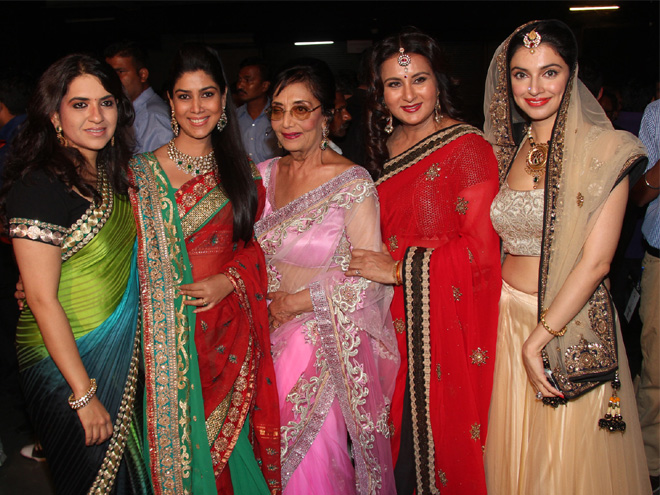
Shaina NC, Sakshi Tanwar, Sadhana, Poonam Dhillon and Divya Khosla Kumar at Shaina NC's fashion show in May 2014

Saree is a timeless creation. The mercurial changes in the world of fashion have no effect whatsoever on it. They are exquisite and will be that way whatever the trends in fashion are, be it now or years later.

— Shaina NC

Shaina's mother, Munira Chudasama, has been in the fashion design industry for many decades. Shaina began designing fashion at the age of eighteen when her mother was unwell; the collection of outfits she designed was a success. Shaina runs the Golden Thimble Boutique, which was set up by her mother, in the upmarket Kala Ghoda area of Mumbai. It is one of the oldest boutiques in Mumbai city. She does not like to design for Bollywood films but rather for individuals. Her clients include celebrities such as: Aishwarya Rai, Juhi Chawla, and Mahima Chaudhry. Her main fashion designing interest is in sarees. She specialises in traditional sarees which include: Chanderis, Paithanis, Chiffons, Silks, and Cottons. Shaina is quoted as saying: "It [saree] is ours, it belongs to us. It is the most flattering garment where a thin person can look voluptuous and a bulky person can camouflage all the unseemly bulges. The younger generation need to be introduced to the garment." She holds a record in the Guinness Book of World Records for the fastest draping of a saree. Shaina is often referred to as Queen of Drapes because of her fifty-four different ways of draping a saree.

=== Politician ===
Shaina was a student of Political Science. She says that she has been interested in politics since she was a child. On 14 September 2004, Shaina joined Bharatiya Janata Party in the presence of BJP leader Gopinath Munde. She was made president of the newly created Health and Cultural Cell of the BJP. Her father, Nana Chudasama, was a well known critic of BJP and its leader Narendra Modi for its handling of the post-Godhra riots. When asked why she chose BJP, Shaina told The Economic Times, "Why not the BJP? It is the most progressive party and also secular in accepting me – daughter of a Muslim mother, Hindu father and married to a Marwari Jain." Shaina contested 2004 Maharashtra State Assembly election against Baba Siddique of the Indian National Congress for the Vandre assembly seat, but lost.

She was appointed BJP's spokesperson for the city of Mumbai in February 2007. In 2008, she became BJP's spokesperson for the Maharashtra state. In the 2009 Maharashtra State Assembly election, Shaina hoped to get a ticket from Malabar Hill constituency, but the BJP leadership preferred three-time sitting MLA Mangal Lodha. In March 2010, she became a member of the National Executive Council of the BJP. In April 2013, she became national spokesperson of the BJP and was included in the panel of spokespersons to participate in television debates on behalf of the party. In April 2013, with the aim of projecting a young, urbane, and women-friendly image of the BJP, party president Rajnath Singh included Shaina in the panel of seven women spokespersons to participate in television debates. Shaina became president of the newly formed BJP Kamgaar Morcha's BJP Chitrapat Union in July 2014. In May 2013, Shaina was appointed treasurer of the BJP's Maharashtra unit. In Feb 2014, she was in contention for the Rajya Sabha MP seat, but considering the upcoming General Election, and Dalit votes, the NDA leadership chose Ramdas Athawale of Republican Party of India. Shaina was asked to run against Priya Dutt of the Indian National Congress from Mumbai North Central constituency for Lok Sabha election, 2014 but she refused feeling that the fight would be "too tough" for her in a minority dominated constituency. In June 2015, she was re-appointed treasurer of BJP Maharashtra for a second term.

== Social work ==
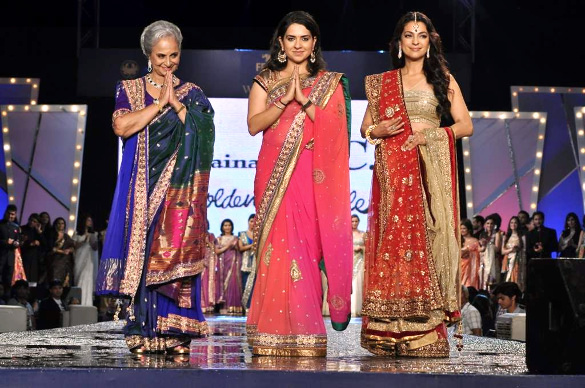
Waheeda Rehman, Shaina NC and Juhi Chawla in Shaina NC's fashion show to raise funds for cancer patients

Since 2002, Shaina and the Cancer Patients' Aid Association (CPAA) have arranged fashion shows each year to raise funds for the treatment of cancer patients, and cancer awareness programmes. The model and actor, Priyanka Khurana Goyal walked for the show organised for supporting Cancer Patients Aid Association (CPAA). Among the attendees were then Maharashtra Chief Minister Devendra Fadnavis and actor Aamir Khan. Many Bollywood celebrities, from established actresses like Waheeda Rehman to younger actors like Ranbir Kapoor, have participated in her fashion shows for this cause. Part of the proceeds from the sale of outfits designed by Shaina goes to CPAA. She has also organised many charity shows to raise funds for the welfare of physically disabled children. She is the trustee of the NGO I Love Mumbai which was founded by her father Nana Chudasama in 1989. The NGO's mission is 'Clean Mumbai, Green Mumbai' and it works towards beautification and cleanliness of the city of Mumbai. The NGO distributes 50,000 free saplings every year to plant in the city. In Dec 2008, Shaina's NGO 'I Love Mumbai' provided financial assistance to Suneeta Yadav and her young daughter Sheetal Yadav, who survived a hand grenade attack in the 2008 Mumbai attacks. Suneeta's husband died in this attack and later she was robbed of government compensation by her brother-in-law. Three months later, in Feb 2009, Shaina's NGO collected ₹7 million and donated it to the heroes and victims of the 2008 Mumbai attacks. In Nov 2010, her I Love Mumbai NGO joined Brihanmumbai Municipal Corporation in a ₹5.2 million project to clean up a 3 -km-long stretch of Arabian Sea shoreline between Cuffe Parade and Haji Ali in South Mumbai. She is the Executive World Chairperson of the NGO Giants International which honours personalities from different walks of life for their outstanding contribution and service to society. The NGO also organises healthcare, family planning, and AIDs awareness programmes. Shaina has received awards for her contribution to society from many organisations like the Jaycees International, Indo-American Society, Lions Clubs International, and Rotary International. As of June 2014, Shaina is supporting the cause of Campa Cola Society residents who are facing eviction and the demolition of their illegal flats.

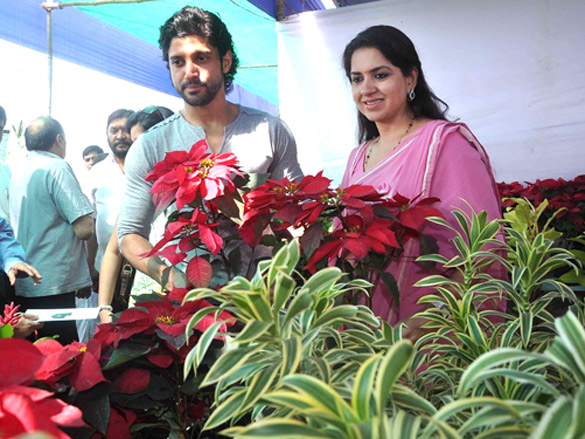
Farhan Akhtar and Shaina NC at tree planting event arranged by Shaina's NGO 'I Love Mumbai' in Jan 2012
