= Thomas Blaney =

Irish physician and philanthropist (1823–1903)

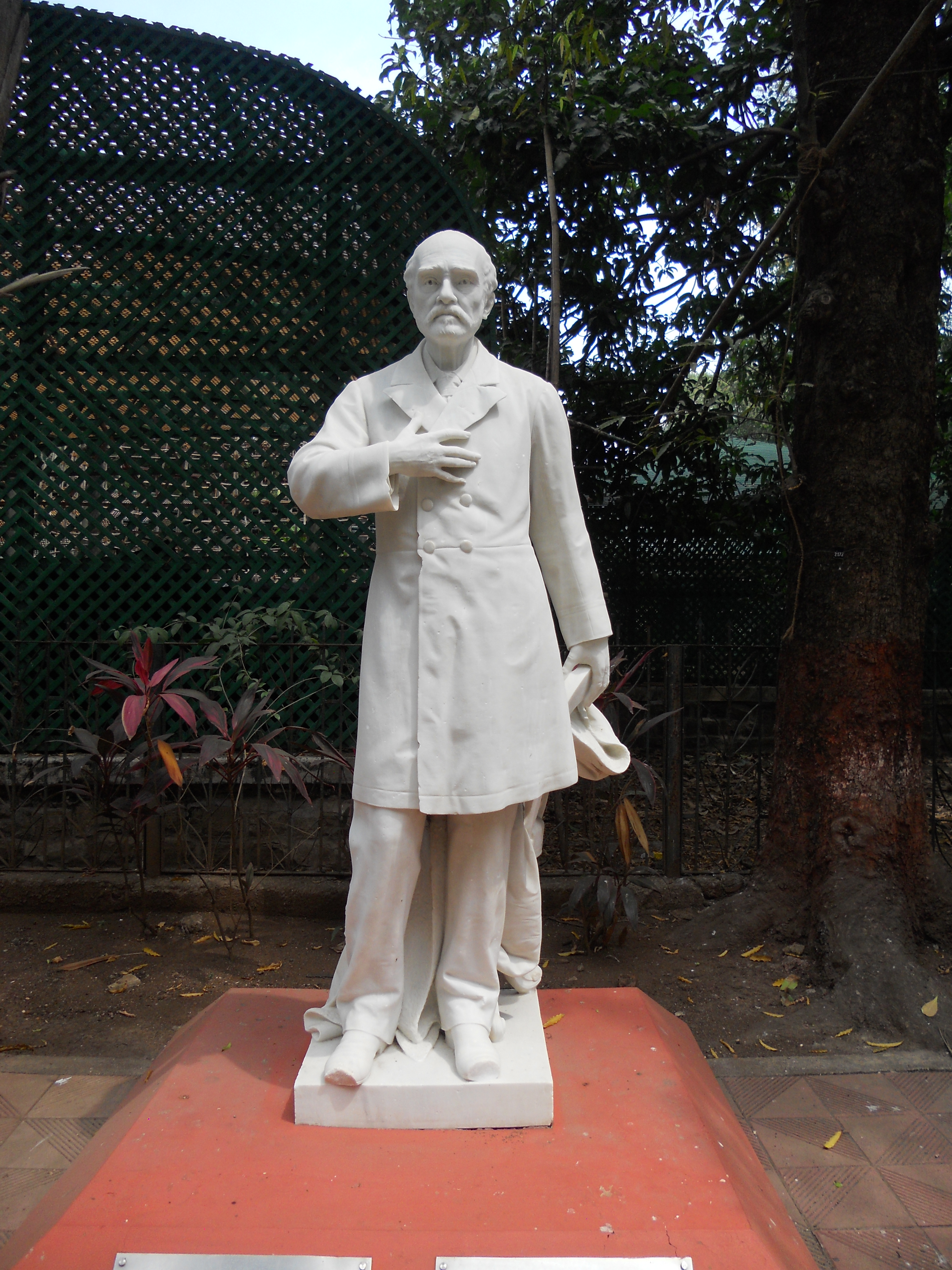
- Statue of Blaney
- Born: 24 May 1823; Caherconlish, Ireland
- Died: 1 April 1903 (aged 79); Bombay, India
- Occupations: Physician and philanthropist

Thomas Blaney CIE (24 May 1823 – 1 April 1903) was an Irish physician and philanthropist in Bombay, India.

== Biography ==
Blaney was born at Caherconlish, Pallas-green, County Limerick, on 24 May 1823. Of humble origin, he went out to Bombay with his parents when only three. Ten years later (1836) he was apprenticed to the subordinate medical department of the East India Company. He served 'up-country' for eight years, but returning to Bombay in 1847 entered the Grant medical college as a government student in 1851, and attended classes there for four years. After reaching the post of apothecary at the European general hospital on Rs. 100 per mensem, he was invalided from the service in 1860. He rapidly founded a large private practice among all classes and aces in the city. In 1867 he published a pamphlet on 'Fevers as connected with the Sanitation of Bombay'; during the prevalence of famine in southern Indian in 1878 he identified relapsing fever. When plague betrayed its presence in 1896, he was foremost in detecting its true nature, and realised the gravity of the situation, which was much under-estimated by the health department of the municipality. Known as 'the jury-wallah doctor,' because he served as coroner from 1876 to 1893, he was held in great local repute professionally, and grateful native patients often remembered him in their wills. All his large earnings, save the small amount needed for Ms simple style of life, were given to the poor and to causes which won his sympathy. He made it a rule to take no professional fee from a widow. For many months he provided in his own home free tuition and a midday meal for. children of ' poor whites.' More than seventy children were thus cared for, and ultimately, under the name of the Blaney school, the institution was taken over and maintained for a time by a representative committee.

In civic affairs Blaney first came into notice by the vigour with which he condemned in the local press, under the pseudonym of 'Q in the Corner,' the wild speculation of the period (1861–5). In 1868 he was appointed to the bench of justices, which had restricted powers of municipal administration, and when a municipal corporation at Bombay was established in 1872 he was one of the original members, retaining office until his retirement from public life. He was elected to the chair on four occasions between 1877 and 1893. A member of the municipality's statutory standing committee responsible for the civic expenditure for nine years, and its chairman from 1890 to 1894, he refused the fees payable for attendance, and thus saved the rates about 1000l. An eloquent speaker and an ardent but always fair fighter, he exercised a wise and salutary influence on civic polity. He successfully resisted the efforts of a powerful English syndicate to obtain control of the water supply, the adequacy and efficiency of which under municipal management were his special care. He was chairman of the joint schools committee, a member of the city improvement trust, and a fellow of the university. The government of India appointed him sheriff of Bombay in 1875 and 1888. He was created a C.I.E. in May 1894, and on 2 June of the same year a statue of him in Carrara marble, by Signor Valla of Genoa, for which upwards of Rs. 22,000 (1460l.) were subscribed by his fellow-citizens, was unveiled, opposite the Bombay municipal buildings, by Mr. H. A. Acworth, I.C.S., then municipal commissioner. Four years later the infirmities of age compelled Blaney's relinquishment of both civic and professional work. His liberality had deprived him of means of support, but a few fellow-townsmen provided for his simple needs. He died a widower on 1 April 1903, and was buried at Sewri cemetery next day. His wife Mary Ann Mulheron whom he married on 29 November 1854 died on 18 September 1874. They had 4 children. Mary Ann herself a widow was previously married to George Thomas Donaldson.
