= Bombay Citizens' Committee =

Bombay Citizens' Committee was an advocacy group which lobbied to keep Bombay city out of Maharashtra during the state reorganisation. The group was headed by a leading cotton industrialist Sir Purshottamdas Thakurdas (1879–1961), with J.R.D. Tata as one of the members, and the committee was composed mostly of Gujaratis. The group submitted a 200-page application to States reorganisation committee in year 1954.

== See also ==
- Bombay Plan
- FICCI
