= Forum of Free Enterprise =

Indian think tank

The Forum of Free Enterprise is a non-political organization, established to educate public opinion in India on free enterprise and democratic way of life. The Forum publishes booklets and leaflets, organises meetings and essay competitions to further its objects. It was founded in 1956 by industrialist and economist A.D. Shroff and has its office in Mumbai.
