= Nana Chudasama =

Indian jurist and mayor

Nana Mansinh Chudasama
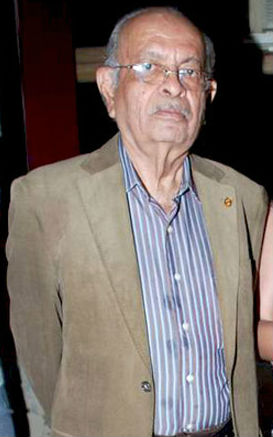
- Nana at trial show of 'Once Upon A Time In Mumbaai'.

Sheriff of Mumbai
- In office 1989–1990
- Preceded by: Jahangir K. S. Nicholson
- Succeeded by: Saad Alim Bagban

Personal details
- Born: 17 June 1933 Rajkot, Bombay State, British India (now in Gujarat, India))
- Died: 23 December 2018 (aged 85)
- Spouse: Munira Nana Chudasama
- Children: 3 (including Shaina Chudasama)

Nana Mansinh Chudasama (17 June 1933 – 23 December 2018) was a jurist and Sheriff of Mumbai.

== Early life and family ==
He was from a noted family Rajput of the Village Keshwala, Gondal Taluka, Rajkot, Dist., Gujarat. His father, Mansinh Chudasama, was police commissioner. Nana was second of three brothers, his elder brother the late Mota Chudasama being a noted businessman, and his younger brother Chhota being associated with Air India for many years. Nana after graduation started his career in the early 1950s as an executive in a US petroleum company in Mumbai; he also managed an apartment at Prithviraj Chambers, on Narayan Dabholkar Road in the elite Nepean Sea Road area, next door to where he lived at the time.

== Career ==
In his later career, Nana became the founder of the NGO Giants International which has over 500 branches in India and branches across the world including the United States, United Kingdom, South Africa, Mauritius and Ukraine. Giants undertakes projects which affect society, such as family welfare, disaster management, education, environment and so on.

Chudasama was also the president of "I Love Mumbai" which he founded when he was Sheriff of Mumbai. The organisation focuses on the greening, beautification and cleaning of Mumbai. He was also the President of Forum Against Drugs and AIDS which he founded, chairperson of the National Kidney Foundation, Founder President of Common Man's Forum, an organisation to safeguard the interests of the common man; Convener, Relief and Rehabilitation Committee, Government of Maharashtra, which assists bomb blast victims. He was also the national president of Jaycees, which had earlier awarded him the Young Man of India Award; former president of Indo-American Society. He was also a member of the Task Force of the Government of Maharashtra to prepare action plan for transforming Mumbai into a better city.

== Death ==
He died on 23 December 2018 at the age of 85 after a brief illness. Shaina Nana Chudasama Shiv Sena leader is his daughter. Nana Chudasama and Munira Chudasama also have one son, Akshay Nana Chudasama, and another daughter, Brinda Nana Chudasama. His children were saddened by his death.
