= Ardeshir Dalal =

Indian businessman (1884–1949)

Sir Ardeshir Dalal, KCIE (24 April 1884 – 8 October 1949) was an Indian Parsi civil servant, and later, a businessman associated with the Tata Group. He was knighted in 1946, and was a vocal opponent of the partition of India.

== Biography ==
Dalal was born on 24 April 1884 in Bombay to Rustomjee Dalal, who worked as share-broker. He studied at Elphinstone College in Mumbai, and In 1905 he applied for J. N. Tata Scholarship for higher studies. He received the scholarship, and studied at St. John's College Cambridge. Following this, he qualified by examination to enter the Indian Civil Service, joining in 1908.

== Career ==
Dalal was initially appointed as a district collector, and served in several districts, eventually serving as deputy secretary to the government of the State of Bombay, and serving as a member of the Provincial Legislative Council in 1923. In 1928, he became the first Indian to serve as Municipal Commissioner of Bombay, serving in that role for three years.

He was the founder of IIT'S. He joined Tata Group as a Director of Tata Steel in 1931 and served Tata group till 1941 and again from 1945 his death in 1949. He was knighted in 1939.

He was one of the signatories to the Bombay Plan formulated in 1944.

In June 1944, he resigned from Tatas as the Viceroy, Lord Wavell, invited him to join the Viceroy's Executive Council as Member-in-Charge of Planning and Development. His contributions as one of the architects of the Government of India's post war economic plan formulated in 1945 have been noted.

He was knighted again as a KCIE in 1946 died on 8 October 1949.

A hospital-cum-nursing college in Jamshedpur has been named after him as Ardeshir Dalal Memorial Hospital.

== Opposition to Division of India ==
Before the creation of Pakistan, Dalal suggested (Note: In an article titled An Alternative to Pakistan which was published in May 1943.) that for the next 10 years, some "experimental" measures should be taken to address the concerns of the India's Muslim community rather than moving ahead with the creation of Pakistan and if the Muslim populace won't be satisfied with them then it should be "free to seek and work out its own destiny in its own way". He suggested that India should adopt a federal constitution with a parliamentary democracy. He proposed giving 33.25% representation to the Muslims in the legislature and central executive, and reserving some representation for the Scheduled castes and Sikhs. He suggested that the citizens be guaranteed civil, personal, and religious freedom by the incorporation of a fundamental rights charter in India's constitution. He also suggested that the Indian constitution should be under the guardianship of India's federal court and 2 out of its 5 judges should be Muslims. He was of the view that the creation of Pakistan "in attempting to solve one problem, will create many more".

He viewed India as not only a geographical but also a cultural and a spiritual entity. In the words of Dalal,

That unity has been forged through countless ages by the culture, traditions and usages of the successive generations of men who have migrated or conquered, settled down and been absorbed through the predominant qualities of tolerance and adaptability which are the characteristics of the Indian civilization.

Dalal believed that the creation of Pakistan would impede this unity and it should be "considered only if no other alternative is possible". Highlighting the primary cause of Muslims' objection to live in a united India under a central government, Dalal wrote,

So long as political parties continue to be based on religious rather than political and economic issues, the Muslims feel that under the British parliamentary form of government which is offered to them they would remain in a state of continued subjection and will never have the opportunity to govern as political parties do elsewhere. [..] It is for the Hindus as the major political party in the country to offer to make all reasonable sacrifices in order to win confidence of the minorities which has been impaired.
