= Priyanka Khurana Goyal =

Indian model

- Born: Delhi, India
- Education: Indian Institute of Management Calcutta
- Occupation: Model
- Title: Mrs India 2015, Mrs Earth 2016

Priyanka Khurana Goyal is an Indian model, actress, the winner of the Mrs. Earth 2015 pageant, and Mrs. India Queen of Substance beauty competition, 2015. She graduated from IIM Kolkata and worked at Nomura Securities as Managing Director before founding Yuvaap, health and wellness initiative specialising in weight management, stress-relief, hormonal issues and diabetes. The founder - actress also volunteers at the Tata Memorial Cancer Hospital.

== Early life and education ==
Priyanka was born and raised in Delhi. She completed her master's degree in business administration from IIM Kolkata. After that, she went to work in investment banking as an executive director at Nomura Securities. Priyanka currently works as the managing director at Nomura India.

== Pageantry ==
Priyanka won the Mrs. India Queen of Substance beauty competition, in 2015. She is also the winner of Mrs. Earth 2015–2016, held at the Grand Palladium Jamaica Resort. The pageant had participants from 20 countries. The contestants were judged based on their intelligence, beauty, and social work. Priyanka was the first Indian to win this title. After winning the title, Priyanka started her fashion line. She has modeled for famous designers such as Manish Malhotra and Shaina NC.

== Acting debut ==
Priyanka made her acting debut in 2020 with the short film "An Indian Girl". The film was produced by VPR Entertainment. Film is also Available on "Hotstar "

Priyanka was also Featured in a Music Video "Tere aane se Phele " by Zee music Company in 2021.
