= Bombay Plan =

1944–45 Indian economic proposals

The Bombay Plan is the name commonly given to a World War II-era set of Import substitution industrialization-based proposals for the development of the post-independence economy of India. The plan, published in 1944/1945 by eight leading Indian industrialists, proposed state intervention in the economic development of the nation after independence from the United Kingdom (which took place in 1947).

Titled A Brief Memorandum Outlining a Plan of Economic Development for India, the signatories of the plan were J. R. D. Tata, Ghanshyam Das Birla, Ardeshir Dalal, Lala Shri Ram, Kasturbhai Lalbhai, Ardeshir Darabshaw Shroff, Sir Purshottamdas Thakurdas and John Mathai. The Plan went through two editions: the first was published in January 1944. This first edition became "Part I" of the second edition, published in 2 volumes in 1945 under the editorship of Purushottamdas Thakurdas.

Although Jawaharlal Nehru, the first Prime Minister of India, did not officially accept the plan, "the Nehruvian era witnessed [what was effectively] the implementation of the Bombay Plan; a substantially interventionist state and an economy with a sizeable public sector." Its perceived influence has given it iconic status, and "it is no exaggeration to say that the Bombay Plan has come to occupy something of a mythic position in Indian historiography. There is scarcely a study of postwar Indian economic history that does not point to it as an indicator of the developmental and nationalistic aspiration of the domestic capitalist class."

The basic objectives were a doubling of the (then current) output of the agricultural sector and a five-fold growth in the industrial sector, both within the framework of a 100 billion Rupee (£72b, $18b) investment (of which 44.8% was slated for industry) over 15 years.^{[a]}

A key principle of the Bombay Plan was that the economy could not grow without government intervention and regulation. Under the assumption that the fledgling Indian industries would not be able to compete in a free-market economy, the Plan proposed that the future government protect indigenous industries against foreign competition in local markets. Other salient points of the Bombay plan were an active role by government in deficit financing and planning equitable growth, a transition from an agrarian to an industrialized society, and—in the event that the private sector could not immediately do so—the establishment of critical industries as public sector enterprises while simultaneously ensuring a market for the output through planned purchases.

Although the Bombay Plan did not itself propose a socialist agenda, "virtually all" commentators acknowledge "that there is a direct line of continuity from the Bombay Plan of 1944-1945 to the First Five-Year Plan in 1950." An alternative line of reasoning is that the Bombay Plan was a reaction to the widespread social discontent of the 1940s (resulting from unprecedented industrial growth during wartime), and a product of the fear that the movement against colonial rule would become a movement against private property.

The Bombay Plan reaped criticism from all quarters: the far left criticized the capitalistic background of the Plan's authors or asserted that the plan did not go far enough. The right foresaw it as a harbinger of a socialist society, and considered it a violation of the agreements of the United Nations "Bretton Woods Conference" (which Shroff had attended). Economists criticized the plan on technical grounds;^{cf.} that it did not take into account the fact that creating capital had an inflationary effect, and with that, its authors had overestimated the capacity of the Indian economy to generate further capital. With rising prices, the purchasing power (for investments) would fall. According to one analysis done in September 2004 (sixty years after the Bombay plan was prepared): "public sector corporations served as the personal fiefdoms of politicians and bureaucrats in power — the state thus became the "private" property of the privileged few. At the same time, private corporate groups prospered thanks to a generous infusion of funds from government-controlled banks and financial institutions. Thus, the losses of the public sector became translated into the profits of the private sector. Successive Congress governments (before the P. V. Narasimha Rao regime) set up an excessively bureaucratic economic system that stifled entrepreneurship and private initiative, on the one hand, and failed to provide primary education and basic health-care to the majority of Indians, on the other."

== Notes ==
- for comparison, the total capitalization of the Indian economy of 1938-1938 is estimated to have been 687 million Rupees (£500 million, $2 billion).

== Bibliography ==
- Ananth, V. Krishna (2005), "Globalization and Communalism: Locating Contemporary Political Discourse in the Context of Liberalization", in Puniyani, Ram (ed.), Religion, Power and Violence: Expression of Politics in Contemporary Times, New Delhi: SAGE, pp. 44–67, ISBN 0-7619-3338-7.
- Anstey, Vera (1945), "Review: A Brief Memorandum Outlining a Plan of Economic Development for India", International Affairs, 21 (4): 555–557.
- Chibber, Vivek (2003), Locked in Place: State-building and Late Industrialization in India, Princeton: Princeton UP, ISBN 0-691-09659-7.
- Thakurdas, Purushottamdas, ed. (1945), A Brief Memorandum Outlining a Plan of Economic Development for India (2 vols.), London: Penguin.
