= Purshottamdas Thakurdas =

Indian businessman and industrialist (1879–1961)

Sir Purshottamdas Thakurdas (1879–1961), KBE CIE, was an Indian Gujarati cotton trader, banker and industrialist from Mumbai, India.

He had served as the Sheriff of Bombay in 1920 and succeeded Sir Mathuradas Vissanji in 1922 as President of Cotton Association of India (later the Cotton Corporation of India). He was knighted in the 1923 Birthday Honours.

He was a member of the Acworth Committee and a member of the Hilton Young Commission. He along with GD Birla then established the Federation of Indian Chambers of Commerce & Industry in 1927, on the advice of Mahatma Gandhi.

During the early 1930s there was a swing among the Indian businessmen towards a policy of more substantial compromise with the Raj, and they found Lord Irwin, Viceroy of India, anxious to meet them half way: "The 'liberal' and 'moderate' leaders, including the prominent Bombay businessman Purshottamdas Thakurdas, issued a statement from Bombay welcoming Irwin's declaration".

On 12 November 1935, he was elected a member of the Local Board for the Western area of the Reserve Bank of India (RBI) and was the fourth longest-serving director on the Central Board of the RBI.

Thakurdas was one of the signatory of Bombay Plan, which was set of proposals for the post-independence economy of India. He headed the Foodgrain Policy Committee of 1947.

Business positions
Preceded by Mathuradas Vissanji	President of Cotton Association of India; 1922–1932	Succeeded by Haridas Madhavdas
