= Cotton Corporation of India =

Central Public Sector Undertaking

The Cotton Corporation of India
- Company type: Central Public Sector Undertaking
- Industry: Textiles
- Founded: 1970
- Headquarters: Mumbai
- Key people: Lalit Kumar Gupta, (Chairman & Managing Director)
- Website: Official website

The Cotton Corporation of India Limited or CCI is a central public sector undertaking under the ownership of the Ministry of Textiles, Government of India, engaged in diverse activities related to trade, procurement, and export of cotton. CCI is a public sector agency responsible for equitable distribution of cotton among the different constituents of the industry and for aiding in the import of cotton. It was incorporated on 31 July 1970 under the Companies Act 1956. CCI is governed by Textile Policy 1985 issued by the Ministry of Textiles.
