= Sheriff of Mumbai =

Designation

The Sheriff of Bombay is an apolitical titular position of authority bestowed for one year on a prominent citizen of Bombay.

The sheriff is an officer of the High Court and the nominal Head of the High Court Department which carries out the orders of the High Court for summoning people, and also for attachment and sealing of properties and if ordered for their auction. The sheriff has an office and staff but does not have any executive powers. The sheriff office is in Bombay High Court, Fort on the Ground Floor. In the order of precedence, the sheriff ranks just below the Mayor. Mumbai (Bombay) and Kolkata (Calcutta) are the only cities in India to maintain this post.

The most important social function of the sheriff is to receive foreign dignitaries at the airport on behalf of the city and to call condolence meetings on the demise of prominent citizens of the city.

The first sheriff of Mumbai after independence was Mahadeo Laxman Dahanukar, a city businessman in 1948. His son, Shantaram Mahadeo Dahanukar was also a Sheriff of Mumbai in 1969.

The sheriff presides over various city-related functions and conferences and is in charge of receiving foreign guests of the government. The post gives the incumbent close access to the Chief Minister of Maharashtra and the Municipal Commissioner of the city. It is often criticised by citizens as a waste of public money. As the post is apolitical, many prominent citizens use it as a platform to showcase their achievements and serve the citizens of the metropolis.

== Former sheriffs ==
Former sheriffs include:

S. No.	Name	Term	Known for
1	George Birdwood	1846	Anglo-Indian official, naturalist, and writer
2	Bomonji Hormusji Wadia	1858	Shipbuilding broker
3	Bhau Daji	1869	Physician and educationalist
4	Bhau Daji	1871	Physician and educationalist
5	Dosabhai Framji Karaka	1872	Publisher, writer and magistrate
6	T.G. Hewlett	1873	Physician
7	Narayan Daji	1875	Physician
8	Thomas Blaney	1876 (1st term)	Physician
9	Atmaram Pandurang	1879	Physician
10	Sorabji Shapurji Bengali	1881	Banker
11	Raghanath Narayan Khote	1883	Merchant
12	Rahimtulla M. Sayani	1885	Lawyer
13	Dinshaw Maneckji Petit	1887	Parsi entrepreneur
14	Thomas Blaney	1888 (2nd term)	Physician
15	James Douglas	1893	Banker and writer
16	Cowasji Hormusji	1894	Physician
17	Ghelabhai Haridas	1896	
18	Sir George Cotton	1897	Businessman
19	Adamjee Peerbhoy	1898	Businessman
20	Sir Jamsetjee Jejeebhoy, Bt	1900	
21	James Douglas	1902	Banker and writer
21	Sir Hurkisondas Nurrotumdas	1903	Businessman
22	Sir Sassoon J. David	1905	Jewish businessman
23	Khan Bahadur Muncherji Cowasji Murzban	1905	Architect and engineer
24	T.W. Cuffe	1906	Businessman
25	E.P. Nicholson	1907	
26	Sir Henry B.E. Proctor	1908	
27	Nicholas Smith Glazebrook	1909	
28	Haji Suleman Abdul Wahed	1910	
29	Shapurji Burjorji Broacha	1911	President of the Native Share and Stock Broker's Association
30	Herbert B. Greaves	1913	
	Meherali Fazulbhoy Chinoy	1914	Broker
	Sir Jamsetjee Jejeebhoy	1915	Businessman
	Sir Thomas Birkett	1917	
	Sir Cowasji Jehangir	1919	Merchant
	Sir Purshottamdas Thakurdas	1920	
	Sidney Julius Gillum	1921	Merchant
	Mahomedbhai Curimbhoy Ebrahim	1922	
	Sir Temulji Bhicaji Nariman	1923	Obstetrician
	Sir Ishwardas Lakhmidas.	1924	
	Sir Henry P.W. Macnaghten	1925	
	Sir Fazulbhoy Curimbhoy	1926	
	Salebhoy K. Barodawala	1926	
	Sir Byramji Jeejeebhoy	1927	Businessman
	Narayan Vishwanath Mandlik	1928	
	Sir Reginald Spence	1929	
	Bandeally Hajibhai Lalji	1930	
	Perozeshah J. Marzban	1931	
	Sir Kikabhai Premchand	1932	
	Sir Hugh G. Cocke	1933	
	Sir Suleman Cassum Mitha, CIE	1934	
	Sir Shapoorji Billimoria	1935	Accountant
	Chunilal B. Melita	1936	
	Sir A. G. Gray	1937	
	Mohamedbhoy Ibrahim Rowjee	1938	Mayor of Bombay, 1946
	Phiroze C. Bharucha	1939	
	Mathuradas Vissanji Khimji	1940	
	T. Sinclair Kennedy	1941	General Manager, Glenfield and Kennedy
	Mirza Rashidali Baig	1942	
	Jamshedji Duggan	1943	Ophthalmic surgeon
	Shantidas Askuran	1944	Silk merchant
	John Brownson Greaves	1945	Industrialist
	A. A. Jasdenwalla	1946	Industrialist
	Mithan Jamshed Lam	1947	Lawyer
	Mahadeo Laxman Dahanukar	1948	Businessman
	Joachim Alva	1949	Lawyer, journalist and politician
	Sir Fazal Ibrahim Rahimtoola	1950	
	Pestonji Phiroz Shah Kapadia	1951	
	Ramdeo Anandilal Podar	1952	
	Khwaja Abdul Hamied	1953	Scientist, industrialist
	Manekji Nadirshah Dalal	1954	
	Motichand G. Shahah	1955	
	Sardar Bahadur Bakshi Dalip Singh	1956	
	Gulestan Rustom Billimoria	1957	
	J. C. Jain	1958	General Manager, Times of India
	Abasaheb Garware	1959	Industrialist, founder Chairman of the Garware Group
	Y. A. Fazalbhoy	1960	
	J. D. Kothawala	1961	
	Frank Moraes	1962	Editor, Times of India
	Ramprasad Khandelwal	1963	
	Appat Balkrishna Nair	1964	
	J. N. Heredia	1965	
	Gangaram Ratansi Joshi	1966	
	Haji Hasham Ismail	1967	Diplomat and Consul General (DR)
	Shorab Kaikhushru Khan	1968	
	Shantaram Mahadeo Dahanukar	1969	
	Vijay Merchant	1970	Cricketer
	Narotam Chand Puri	1971	
	Shadi Lal Jain	1972	
	Mehboob Nasrullah	1972	Social Worker
	J. G. Bodhe	1973	Engineer
	Kantikumar R. Podar	1974	
	T. V. Ramanujam	1975	
	Leela Moolgaokar	1976	Social worker
	Anjanabai Magar	1977	
	Narendra Narotamdas Kapadia	1978	
	Ram Kumar Batra	1979	Businessman
	Dilip Kumar	1980	Film actor and social worker
	Bal Krishna Goyal	1981	Cardiologist
	Sunil Dutt	1982	Film actor, politician and social worker
	Sohrab Pirojsha Godrej	1983	Industrialist
	Madhav Laxmanrao Apte	1984	Cricketer and businessman
	Mohanbahai I. Patel	1985	Industrialist
	Trimbak Krishnarao Tope	1986	Former principal (GLC), former vice-chancellor (Mumbai University), Constitutional expert
	Sadrudin Hasan Daya	1987	Businessperson
	Jahangir K. S. Nicholson	1988	Cotton merchant
	Nana Chudasama	1989, 1990	Social activist
	Saad Alim Bagban	1991	
	Homi Sethna	1991	Ex-Chairman, Atomic Energy Commission of India
	Bakul Rajani Patel	1992	Businesswoman
	Fakhruddin T. Khorakiwala	1993	Businessman
	I. M. Kadri	1994	Architect
	Sunil Gavaskar	1995	Cricketer
	Subir Kumar Choudhury	1996	Businessman
	Usha Kiran	1997	Actress
	Kulwant Singh Kohli	1998	Restaurateur
	Chandrakant Bakshi	1999	Writer
	Augustine Francis Pinto	2000	Chairman, Ryan Group Of Institutions
	Ashok V. Mehta	2001	Businessman
	Kiran Shantaram	2002	Filmmaker
	Jagannathrao Hegde	2003	Dentist
	Sadruddin Daya	2005	Businessman
	Vijaypat Singhania	2006	Businessman
	no election	2007	
	Indu Shahani	2008	Academic
	no election Abdul Munaf Kazi, Deputy Sheriff of Mumbai (appointed March 1, 1990), served as acting sheriff of Mumbai	2009–2013	
	Satish Chitgopekar	2016	Academic

== See also ==
- Brihanmumbai Municipal Corporation
- Coat of arms of Mumbai
- Administrative divisions of Mumbai
- Mayor of Mumbai
- Municipal Commissioner of Mumbai
- Sheriff of Kolkata
- Sheriff of Madras
