= List of people from Gujarat =

This is a list of notable people whose ancestry has been traced to Gujarat, India.

Name	Occupation	Known As
Jalaram Bapa	Hindu Saint	Jogi Jalaram, Jalaram Bapa
Mahatma Gandhi	Politician, writer, philosopher, lawyer	Independence activist and Father of the Nation of India
Sardar Vallabhbhai Patel	Politician, lawyer	Indian Freedom Fighter, First Home Minister Of India, Loh Purush (Iron man of India)
Indulal Kanaiyalal Yagnik	Politician, writer, editor	Independence activist and founder of Gujarat state
Muhammad Ali Jinnah	Lawyer, politician	Father of the Nation of Pakistan, first Governor-General of Pakistanfounder of Pakistan
Freddie Mercury	Singer and Songwriter	Widely regarded as one of the greatest singers in the history of rock music Queen_(band)
Azim Premji	Industrialist	Chairman of Wipro
Amit Shah	politician	Home minister of India
Sujan R. Chinoy	Ambassador/diplomat	
Praful Bhavsar	Scientist	Director, Space Applications Center, ISRO
Raj Bhavsar	Gymnast	Olympics Bronze Medalist
C. Kumar N. Patel	Electrical engineering	IEEE Medal of Honor
Narendra Modi	Politician	Prime Minister of India & Former Chief Minister of Gujarat
Dr. Vikram Sarabhai	Physicist and Astronomer	Founder and First Chairperson of ISRO
Dhirubhai Ambani	Business	Reliance Industries
Mukesh Ambani	Business	Reliance Industries Ltd.
Anil Ambani	Business	Reliance Industries (ADAG Group)
Dr. Homi J. Bhabha	Nuclear Physicist	First Chairperson of the Atomic Energy Commission of India
Razack Sattar	Real Estate Tycoon & Businessman	Founder of the Prestige Group
Uday Kotak	Business	Kotak Mahindra Bank
Dilip Shanghvi	Business	Sun Pharmaceutical
Pranav Mistry	Scientist	inventor and computer scientist
P. N. Bhagwati	Justice	chief justice of India
Gulzarilal Nanda	Politician	Bharat Ratna for his contribution in the field of public affairs
Mansukh Mandaviya	Politician	Minister of State for Road Transport & Highways, Shipping, Chemicals & Fertilizers, Government of India
Morarji Ranchhodji Desai	Politics	Bharat Ratna for his contribution in public affairs
Hanif Mohammad	Cricketer	Born in Junagadh, First Triple Century by a Pakistani, First Pakistani First Class Cricketer to make a quadruple century
Homai Vyarawalla	Photojournalist	Padma Vibhushan
Dashrath Patel	Designer	established National Institute of Design in Ahmedabad, Padma Bhushan
Mallika Sarabhai	Dancer, activist	Padma Bhushan
Umashankar Joshi	Literature or philosophy	
Gulabdas Broker	Literature or philosophy	Padma Shri
Zaverchand Meghani	Literature or philosophy	Known as "Rashtraiya Shayar", title given by Gandhiji
Thakkar Bapa	Misc-Social Worker	famous for his works for the upliftment of tribes
Laxman Barot	Bhajanik and folk singer	performer of Gujarati bhajans and Santvani
Abbas Tyabji	Politics	
Ahmed Patel	Politics	
Chimanbhai Patel	Politics	
H. M. Patel	Politics	
K. M. Munshi	Politics	Lawyer
Karan Bilimoria	Politics	
Kasturba Gandhi	Politics	
Mahadev Desai	Politics	
Meghnad Desai	Politics	
Morarji Desai	Politics	Indian Prime Minister who got highest civilization award (Bharat Ratna, Nishan-e-Pakistan from India and Pakistan respectively)
Savjibhai Korat	Politics	
Shyamji Krishna Varma	Politics	
Suresh Mehta	Politics	
Vithalbhai Patel	Politics	
Gitaben Rathva	Politics	
Mohansinh Chhotubhai Rathava	Politics	
Nautamlal Bhagavanji Mehta	Business, Activism	Gujarati businessman
Shrimad Rajchandra	Religion	revered Jain poet, philosopher and the spiritual guru of Mahatma Gandhi
Zain Bhikha	Religion	
Ahmed Deedat	Religion	
Dayananda Saraswati	Social reformer	founder of Arya Samaj
Morari Bapu	Religion	
Shastriji Maharaj	Religion	spiritual leader of the BAPS Swaminarayan Sanstha
Yogiji Maharaj	Religion	4th spiritual leader of the BAPS Swaminarayan Sanstha
Pramukh Swami Maharaj	Religion	5th spiritual leader of the BAPS Swaminarayan Sanstha
Ankita Raina	Sports	tennis, India No.1 singles player
Ajay Jadeja	Sports	cricketer, all-rounder
Irfan Pathan	Sports	cricketer, all-rounder
Munaf Patel	Sports	cricketer, bowler
Nari Contractor	Sports	cricketer, bowler
Nayan Mongia	Sports	cricketer, wicket keeper
Parthiv Patel	Sports	cricketer, wicket keeper
Ravindra Jadeja	Sports	cricketer, bowler, all-rounder
Vinoo Mankad	Sports	cricketer, All-rounder
Yusuf Pathan	Sports	cricketer, All-rounder
Cheteshwar Pujara	Sports	Cricketer, Batsman
Jaydev Unadkat	Sports	Cricketer, bowler
Hardik Pandya	Sports	Cricketer, All rounder
Krunal Pandya	Sports	Cricketer, All rounder
Jasprit Bumrah	Sports	Cricketer, bowler
Axar Patel	Sports	Cricketer, bowler
Rajesh Chauhan	Sports	Cricketer, Bowler
Cowasji Shavaksha Dinshaw (Adenwalla)	Entrepreneur	Founder of the modern port of Aden
Byram Dinshawji Avari	Hotelier	Founder and chairman of the Avari Group of companies
Avabai Jamsetjee Jeejeebhoy	Philanthropist	Builder of Mahim Causeway, connects two islands of Bombay and Salsette (north Bombay)
Byramjee Jeejeebhoy Sir	Philanthropist	Founder of B.J. Medical College, Pune
Jamsetji Jeejeebhoy, Sir	Philanthropist	Opened sea trade with China; J J Hospital
Cowasjee Jehangir, Sir	Civil engineer	Master constructor of Bombay
Fardunjee Marzban	Business	Founded the first vernacular newspaper on the Indian subcontinent Bombay Samachar
Hormusjee Naorojee Mody, Sir	Business	financier and industrialist in Hong Kong
Dinshaw Maneckji Petit, Sir	Business	founded the first textile factories in India
Cyrus Poonawalla	Industrialist, pharmacologist	co-founder of the Serum Institute of India
Cowasji Jehangir Readymoney Sir	1st Baronet, philanthropist	including various academic buildings of the Bombay University.
Jehangir Hormusjee Ruttonjee	Industrialist	Founded Hong Kong's first brewery; established the first anti-tuberculosis sanatorium in the far-east
Nowroji Saklatwala	Industrialist	Chairman of Tata group
Ratan Tata	Industrialist	Chairman of Tata group (1991–2012)
Homi Nusserwanji Sethna Padma Vibhushan awardee	Chemical engineer	guided the development of India's first nuclear explosive device.
Ardeshir Darabshaw Shroff	Economist	delegate at the 1944 Bretton Woods Conference; co-author of the Bombay Plan; founder-director of the Investment Corporation of India; first Indian chairman of the Bank of India
Dorabji Tata, Sir	Industrialist and philanthropist	Sir Dorab Tata Trust
Jamsetji Nusserwanji Tata	Industrialist	Founder of the Tata group of companies, titled a "One-Man Planning Commission" by Jawaharlal Nehru Known as the Father of Modern Indian Industries
Jehangir Ratanji Dadabhoy (J. R. D.) Tata	Industrialist	Founder of India's first commercial airline: Air India
Lovji Nusserwanjee Wadia	Shipwright and naval architect	Builder of the first dry-dock in Asia
Ness Wadia	Business	Joint-Managing Director of Bombay Dyeing
Mahipatsinh Chavda	Academic	Vice chancellor, psychologist.
Mahzarin Banaji	Professor of Psychology	Harvard University
Jamshed Bharucha	President, Cooper Union	Formerly, Dean of the Faculty of Arts & Sciences at Dartmouth College (first Indian American to serve as the dean of a school at an Ivy League institution).
Homi K. Bhabha	Cultural-studies theorist; professor	Harvard University.
Rusi Taleyarkhan	Professor of Nuclear Engineering	Purdue University.
Ardeshir TaraporeLieutenant Colonel	Military	Indian Army, winner of the Param Vir Chakra, India's highest award for gallantry
Aspy Engineer	Military	Former Chief of the Air Staff, Indian Air Force
Fali Homi Major	Military	Former Chief of the Air Staff of the Indian Air Force
Sam Manekshaw	Military	Former Indian Army chief and the Second Indian Field Marshal
Jal Cursetji	Military	Former Chief of the Naval Staff, Indian Navy
Adi M. Sethna	Military	Former Vice Chief of the Army Staff, Indian Army
FN Billimoria	Military	Lieutenant General, father of Karan Bilimoria, Lord Bilimoria
Behram "Busybee" Contractor	Journalist and columnist	
Nariman "Nari" Contractor	Cricketer	Coach at the CCI Academy.
Ardeshir Cowasjee	Investigative journalist and newspaper columnist	
Nauheed Cyrusi	Arts and entertainment	Model, film actress, television presenter
Bejan Daruwalla	Astrology	
Maneckji Nusserwanji Dhalla	High priest and religious scholar	Zoroastrisms
Diana Eduljee	Cricketer	First captain of the Indian women's Cricket team – from 1978 till 1993
Farokh Engineer	Cricketer	
Zerbanoo Gifford	Human rights campaigner	
Aban Marker Kabraji	Pakistani ecologist	Asian regional director of IUCN
Rustom Khurshedji Karanjia	Journalist and editor	Founder of India's first tabloid, Blitz.
Jivanji Jamshedji Modi Sir	Religion	Zoroastrian scholar, Ph.D. from Heidelberg, Germany, recognition and awards, for scholarship, from Sweden, France, and Hungary.
Cyrus Poncha	Sports	Asian Squash Federation Junior Coach of the Year 2003–4.
Pahlan Ratanji "Polly" Umrigar	Sports	Cricketer.
Minocher Bhandara	Politician	Pakistani parliamentarian and owner of Muree Brewery.
Mancherjee Bhownagree	Politician	Second Asian to be elected to the House of Commons (Conservative).
Jamsheed Marker	Politician	Pakistani diplomat, ambassador to more countries than any other person; recipient of Hilal-i Imtiaz.
Minoo Masani	Politician	Author, parliamentarian and a member of the Constituent Assembly.
Frene Ginwala	Politician	Member of the ANC and aided Nelson Mandela in abolishing apartheid in South Africa. Later served for 7 years as Speaker Of the House of Parliament in South Africa
Jamshed Nusserwanjee Mehta	Politician	Former Mayor of Karachi for 12 consecutive years.
Justice Dorab Patel	Justice	Former Chief Justice of Sindh High Court, former Justice of Supreme Court of Pakistan and human rights campaigner.
Cowasji Jehangir (Readymoney)	Justice	J.P.; introduced income tax in India; first baronet of Bombay.
Rustam S. Sidhwa	Justice	Judge on the Supreme Court of Pakistan as well as one of the original eleven judges of the International Criminal Tribunal for the former Yugoslavia.
Shapurji Saklatvala	Socialist workers	Welfare activist, third Asian to be elected to the House of Commons (Communist, Labour).
Ajay Bhatt	Computer architect	Inventor of USB
B. P. Wadia	Indian theosophist and labour activist	Pioneered the creation of workers unions in India.
Bhikaiji Cama	Politician	Political activist, co-creator of the Indian nationalist flag.
Feroze Gandhi	Politician	Journalist and politician; Indian MP under Jawaharlal Nehru; father of Rajiv Gandhi and grandfather of Rahul Gandhi.
Rajiv Gandhi	Politician	Prime minister of India and father of Rahul Gandhi
Rahul Gandhi	Politician	Indian politician, Member of Parliament
Pherozeshah Mehta, Sir	Politician	Political activist, co-founder and first President of the Indian National Congress, founder of the Bombay Municipal Corporation.
Kalubhai Maliwad	Politician	Member of 2002 Gujarat Legislative Assembly
Dadabhai Naoroji	Economist, political activist	First Asian to be elected to the House of Commons (Liberal), first to publicly demand independence from Great Britain.
Khurshed Framji Nariman	Politician	Social activist, Mayor of Bombay; Member of the Indian National Congress.
Sam Piroj Bharucha	Justice	Chief Justice of India
S. H. Kapadia	Justice	Chief Justice of India
Fali Sam Nariman	Justice	Jurist, recipient of the Padma Bhushan and Padma Vibhushan
Nanabhoy ("Nani") Palkhivala	Justice	Prominent jurist and economist
Soli Jehangir Sorabjee	Justice	Former Attorney-General of India
Rattanbai Petit	Justice	Second wife of Muhammad Ali Jinnah
Dossabhoy Muncherji Raja	Justice	First Indian to be appointed appraiser of precious stones to British Indian customs. Awarded the title of Khan Sahib.
Bukhtyar Rustomji	Justice	Mumbai-born Lancaster doctor executed for murdering his wife and a maid
Jehangir Sabavala	Arts and entertainment	painter
Keshubhai Patel	Politician	Former Chief Minister of Gujarat
A. D. Patel	Politician	Fiji politician
Kamlesh Patel, Baron Patel of Bradford	Politician	British politician
S. B. Patel	Politician	Indian politician
Vithalbhai Patel	Politician	Indian politician
Praful Patel	Politician	Indian politician
Priti Patel	Politician	British politician, Member of Parliament since 2010
R. D. Patel	Politician	Indo-Fijian lawyer
Eboo Patel	Politician	American political consultant
Haribhai M. Patel	Politician	Indian politician
Dinsha Patel	Politician	Indian politician
Dahyabhai Patel	Politician	Indian freedom fighter, politician
Vinod Patel	Politician	Fiji-Indian politician
Sone Lal Patel	Politician	Indian politician
Navin Patel	Politician	Fiji-Indian politician
Somchandbhai Solanki	Politician	Indian politician
Somabhai Gandalal Koli Patel	Politician	Indian politician
Pasha Patel	Politician	Indian politician
Babubhai J. Patel	Politician	Indian politician
Kanjibhai Patel	Politician	Indian politician
Vinubhai Patel	Politician	Fiji-Indian politician
Dipak Patel	Politician	Zambian politician
Harilal Madhavjibhai Patel	Politician	Indian politician
Kishanbhai Vestabhai Patel	Politician	Indian politician
Patel Dahyabhai Vallabhbhai	Politician	Indian politician
Babubhai Jashbhai Patel	Politician	Chief Minister, Gujarat
R. K. Singh Patel	Agriculturist and politician	
Parthiv Patel	Sports	Indian cricketer
Mitesh Patel	Sports	Indian hockey player
Samit Patel	Sports	English cricketer
Jayant Patel	Sports	Indian doctor
Min Patel	Sports	Indian cricketer
Brijesh Patel	Sports	Indian cricketer
Jasu Patel	Sports	Indian cricketer
Jyotsna Patel	Sports	Indian cricketer
Malhar Patel	Sports	Kenyan cricketer
Nandikishore Patel	Sports	Ugandan cricketer
Jitendra Patel	Sports	Canadian cricketer
Mohan Patel	Sports	New Zealand hockey player
Dinesh Patel	Sports	American baseball player
Rakep Patel	Sports	Kenyan cricketer
Brijal Patel	Sports	Kenyan cricketer
Kalpesh Patel	Sports	Kenyan cricketer
Ashish Patel	Sports	Canadian cricketer
Ashok Patel	Sports	Indian cricketer
Niraj Patel	Sports	Indian cricketer
Rakesh Patel	Sports	Indian cricketer
Dipak Patel	Sports	Indian cricketer
Kalpesh Patel	Sports	Indian cricketer
R. D. Patel	Sports	Tanzanian cricketer
C. D. Patel	Sports	Tanzanian cricketer
Ashok Sitaram Patel	Sports	Kenyan cricketer
Ramesh Patel	Sports	New Zealand hockey player
Narendra Patel, Baron Patel	Sports	Tanzanian obstetrician
I. G. Patel	Economist	Indian economist
Chimanbhai Patel	Politician	Indian politician
Manibehn Patel	Politician	Indian freedom fighter
Tribhuvandas Kishibhai Patel	Politician	Indian freedom fighter, activist
Amit Patel	Doctor	American surgeon
Vimla L. Patel	Doctor	Canadian psychologist
Ramanbhai Patel	Doctor	Indian chemist
Nisha Patel	Police	British police officer
Akhil Patel	Sports	English cricketer
Chai Patel	Doctor	British doctor and businessman
Hemish Shah	Business	British stock broker
Nand Kumar Patel	Politician	Indian politician
Rita Patel	Sports	Indian cricketer
Sameer Patel	Sports	English cricketer
Karsanbhai Patel	Business	Indian industrialist
A. K. Patel	Politician	Indian politician
V. G. Patel	Economist	Indian author, economist
Harilal Manilal Patel	Judiciary	Fiji-Indian lawyer
Patel Sudhakar Reddy	Politician	Indian revolutionary
Surendra Motilal Patel	Politician	Indian politician
Jivabhai Ambalal Patel	Politician	Indian politician
Apoorva D. Patel	Doctor	Indian physicist
Prahlad Singh Patel	Politician	Indian politician
Shiv Kumar Patel	Judiciary	Indian outlaw
Framjee Nasarwanjee Patel	Business	Indian merchant, philanthropist
Chandrakant T. Patel	Science	
Sheela Patel	Politician	Indian activist
Sam Pitroda	Telecommunications engineering	Padma Bhusan
Ratilal Chandaria	Businessman and philanthropist	Gujarati Lexicon founder
Juned Patel	Indian politician	Indian National Congress
Ranchhodlal Chhotalal	Business	
Ramesh Oza	Hindu preacher	Bhagwad Kathakar
Morari Bapu	Hindu preacher	Ram Charit Manas Kathakar
Hardik Patel	Politician	Social and political leader
Anandiben Patel	politician	Governor of Madhya Pradesh and Chhattisgarh and former CM of Gujarat

== Arts and entertainment ==
Name	Notes
Alia Bhatt	Movie actress
Abhijat Joshi	Movie script writer
Aishwarya Majmudar	Singer
Aditya Pancholi	Actor
Alka Yagnik	Singer
Ajit Merchant	Music composer
Alpesh Patel	American film director
Ami Trivedi	Theatre and TV actor
Amit Trivedi	Music composer
Anandji Virji Shah	Music composer
Anand Pandit	Movie Producer
Anshul Trivedi	Bollywood actor
Anuradha Patel	Indian actress
Ardeshir Irani	Filmmaker
Aruna Irani	Bollywood actress
Asha Parekh	Bollywood actress
Ashmit Patel	Bollywood actor
Ayesha Takia	Bollywood actress
Babubhai Mistry	Special Effect -Bollywood film -Trick Scene Master
Bapsi Sidhwa	Author and screenwriter; vocal proponent of women's rights
Behramji Malabari	Poet, publicist, author, and social reformer
Ben Kingsley	Movie actor
Boman Irani	Bollywood actor
Bhikhudan Gadhvi	Gujarati folk singer, Sahityakar
Bhoomi Trivedi	Singer
Cyrus Broacha	MTV India VJ and stand-up comedian
Darshan Jariwala	Movie actor
Darshan Raval	Singer
Deena M. Mistri	Author and educationalist; recipient of Pakistan's "Pride of Performance" medal
Dev Patel	Movie actor
Devang Patel	Indian singer
Dhvani Desai	Animation filmmaker
Dina Pathak	Bollywood actress
Disha Vakani	Television actress, best known for her role in the TV show Taarak Mehta Ka Ooltah Chashmah.
Dilip Joshi	Television actor, best known for his role in popular TV show Taarak Mehta Ka Ooltah Chashmah
Erick Avari	Hollywood actor
Fagun Thakrar	Movie director, actress
Falguni Pathak	Singer; also referred to as Garba Queen
Vipul K Rawal	Scriptwriter of the movie Iqbal (film)
Farah Khan	Bollywood choreographer, actress and director
Farrukh Dhondy	Novelist, short story writer, screenwriter, journalist
Firdaus Kanga	Author, actor and screenwriter
Gayatri Patel	Actress
Ghanashyam Nayak	Singer and Actor
Gieve Patel	Poet
Godrej Sidhwa	Theologian, historian and high priest
Harish Patel	Actor
Hemant Chauhan	Singer
Himesh Patel	British actor
Himesh Reshammiya	Music composer, singer, actor, producer
Homai Vyarawalla	First woman photojournalist of India
Homi Adajania	Film director and writer
Indra Kumar	Movie director
Ishu Patel	Animated film director
Ismail Darbar	Music composer
Ismail Merchant	Movie producer
Jayant Parikh	Painter, printmaker, muralist
Jashwant Gangani	Film Director, Government Award Winner
Kaikhosru Shapurji Sorabji	Composer, music critic, pianist, and writer
Kaizad Gustad	Film director
Kalpen Modi	American actor
Kalyanji Virji Shah	Music composer
Karan Patel	Actor
Kavi Kant	Poet
Keki Daruwalla	Poet and writer
Ketan Mehta	Movie director
Ketan Mehta	Movie director
Kiran Shah	Actor and stunt player
Kunal Ganjawala	Singer
Mahesh Bhatt	Movie director
Mahesh Kanodia	Singer
Mahesh Kanodia	Music director
Malhar Thakar	Film actor
Mallika Sarabhai	Dancer
Manhar Udhas	Singer
Manmohan Desai	Movie director
Mauli Dave	Indian singer, actor, dancer, and television host
Mehli Mehta	Musician, founder of the Bombay Philharmonic and Bombay String Orchestras.
Mehr Jesia	Model
Mukesh Bhatt	Movie producer
Nanabhai Bhatt	Bollywood director
Nandan Mehta	Musician, founder of 'Saptak'. Shri Nandan Mehta was an outstanding tabla exponent of the Banaras Baaj. Apart from being a noted performer and a guru, he was respected as an institution builder who helped promote our rich musical heritage.
Naresh Kanodia	Film actor
Narsinh Mehta	Poet-saint
Natvar Bhavsar	American painter
Navnit Bham	Film director, producer
Neil Patel	American scenic designer
Neeraj Vora	Film director, writer, actor and composer
Nikki Patel	British actress
Nina Wadia	British comedian and television actress, currently and most notably from EastEnders
Niyati Fatnani	Television actress and dancer
Pan Nalin (Nalin Kumar Pandya)	International filmmaker, director
Pannalal Patel	Writer
Paresh Rawal	Bollywood actor
Parveen Babi	Bollywood actress and model
Persis Khambatta	Actress and model, Miss India in 1965
Pooja Bhatt	Bollywood actress
Pooja Shah	British actress
Prachi Desai	Television and Bollywood actress
Pratik Gandhi	Actor, Theatre Artist
Priya Saraiya	Bollywood lyricist
Rajendra Keshavlal Shah	Poet
Ranjit Barot	Music composer
Ratna Pathak	Bollywood actress
Ravi Patel	American actor
Rihaan Patel	Film director
Rohinton Mistry	Novelist, short story author, screenplay writer
Robin Bhatt	Bollywood writer, Screenplay, Producer, Dialogues
Sachin–Jigar	Bollywood music composer
Sajid Nadiadwala	Movie producer
Salim–Sulaiman	Music composer, singer
Sam Dastor	Television actor and director
Sanjay Gadhvi	Movie director
Sanjay Leela Bhansali	Movie director
Shapur Kharegat	Journalist, editor and director of The Economist (Asia)
Shefali Shah	Movie actress
Shekhar Ravjiani	Music composer, singer
Shiamak Davar	Bollywood choreographer
Shivam Pathak	Singer
Shravan Rathod	Music composer
Siddharth Randeria	Theater and film actor
Sohrab Modi	Theater and film actor, director and producer
Sooni Taraporevala	Screenwriter, author and photographer
Supriya Pathak	Bollywood and television actress
Salil Desai	Novelist
Tiku Talsania	Actor Hindi Gujarati film
Tanmay Shah	Director, producer, writer, editor, cinematographer
Tinu Suresh Desai	Director film Rustom, Mission Raniganj
Tanvi Vyas	Model
Tulip Joshi	Bollywood actress
Urvashi Dholakia	Television and Bollywood actress
Vasant Rai	Sitar player
Vatsal Sheth	Bollywood actor
Vikram Bhatt	Bollywood writer, producer
Vipul Shah	Movie director
Viraf Patel	Model
Yatin Patel	Photographer
Zarin Mehta	Musician, executive director of the New York Philharmonic since 2000
Jhinabhai Desai	Poet and author better known by his pen name Snehrashmi, educator, political leader and Indian independence activist
Zubin Mehta	Musician, musical director for Life of the Israel Philharmonic Orchestra and Maggio Musicale
Zubin Varla	Stage actor
Sanjeev Kumar	Bollywood actor, (real name Harihar Jariwala)
Namitha	Model, Tollywood actor, Miss India 4th
Manish Dayal	American actor

== Gujarat's British royalty connection ==
In June 2013, Gujarat came to the media fore when it was discovered that the British monarchy have Indian mitochondrial DNA traced through Princess Diana which has been maternally inherited by both her sons, Prince William and Prince Harry. The connection traces back eight generations, to Eliza Kewark, who was housekeeper to Prince William's ancestor Theodore Forbes, born in 1788, a Scottish merchant from a landowning family who had travelled to India to work for the East India Company in Surat, a port north of Bombay. The DNA was passed down through Eliza's daughters and granddaughters to Princess Diana. Eliza is variously described in contemporary documents as "a dark-skinned native woman", "an Armenian woman from Bombay", and "Mrs. Forbesian". Genealogist William Addams Reitwiesner assumed she was Armenian. In June 2013, BritainsDNA announced that genealogical DNA tests on two of William's distant cousins in the same direct maternal line confirm that Eliza Kewark was of Indian descent, via her direct maternal line.

== See also ==
- List of Gujarati poets
- Lists of Indians by state
- List of Parsis
