= Tanmay =

Tanmay is an Indian masculine given name. Notable people with the name include:

- Tanmay Bhat (born 1987) Indian comedian
- Tanmay Shah
- Tanmay Jahagirdar
- Tanmay Mishra
- Tanmay Ssingh
- Tanmay Srivastava
- Tanmay Agarwal
- Tanmay Ghosh
