= Anil Relia =

Indian art collector (born 1957)

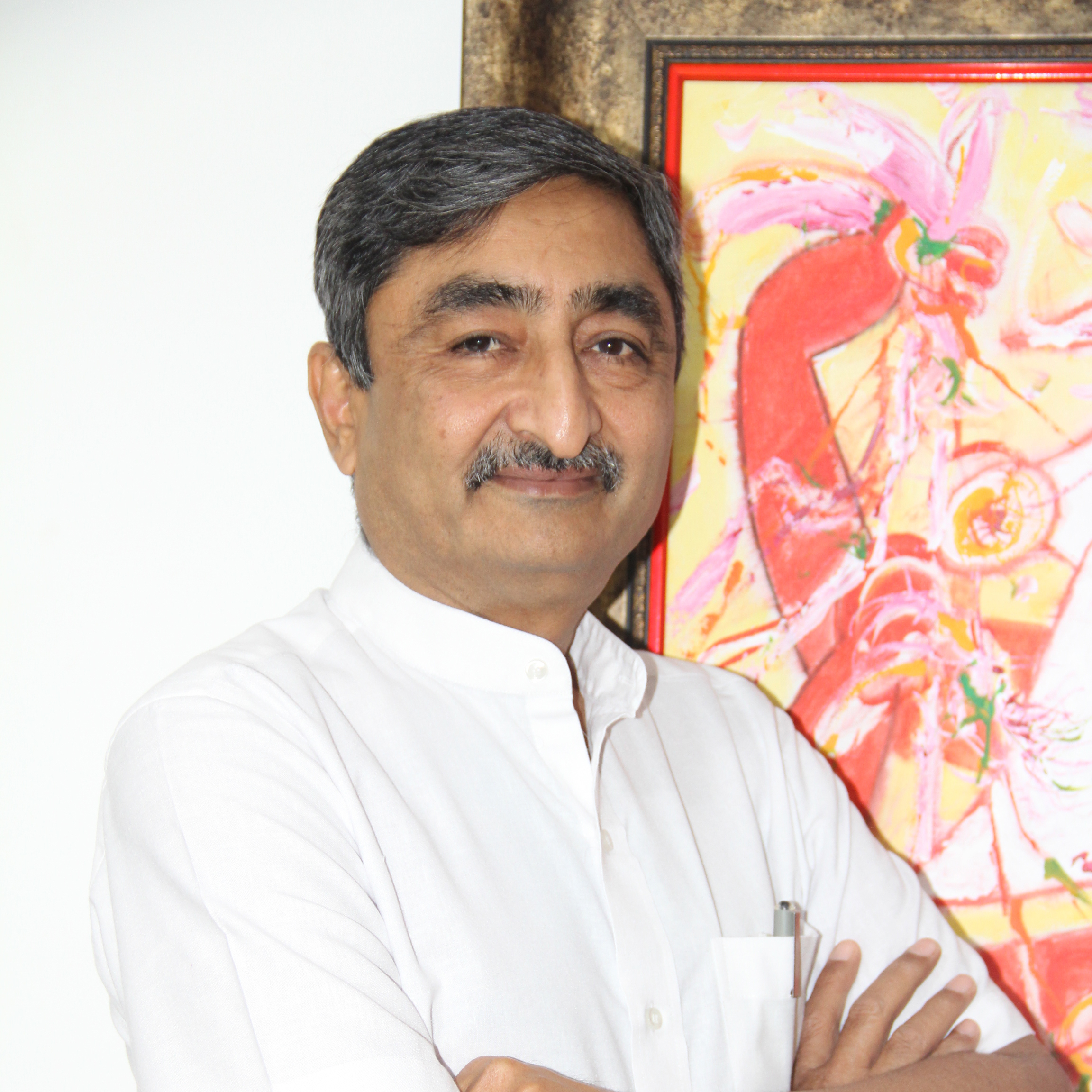
- Art collector
- Born: 6 February 1957 (age 69); Surat
- Education: Maharaja Sayajirao University of Baroda
- Occupation: Art collector
- Spouse: Tanuja Relia
- Children: Radhika and Manan

Anil Relia is an Indian art collector, known for his portrait collection. He has over 3000 portraits and his personal collection includes many miniature paintings, early photographs along with works of artists like Raja Ravi Varma, M. F. Husain, Hemen Majumdar, Bhupen Khakhar, Jyoti Bhatt, Haku Shah, K. G. Subramanyan, S.H. Raza, Thota Vaikuntam, Manu Parekh and many more.

== Early life ==
Born in Surat – Gujarat, he graduated from Maharaja Sayajirao University of Baroda in Fine Arts Major (Applied Arts, Serigraphy and Photography) in 1978. Since childhood Anil showed a passion for collecting art. His first so called art collection consisted of the labels pasted on cloth bundles that would arrive near a warehouse close to his house. He would carefully peel the labels off, wash them and preserve them in his school book. This passion got all the more fueled in college and he started using his pocket money to collect works of art instead of spending it on other necessities. On completion of his studies he shifted to the city of Ahmedabad for work.

== Career ==
Anil Relia began his career with being a graphic designer in an advertising firm in Ahmedabad. While working, as a pastime, he made Diwali cards for his family. The money earned, helped him quit his job and set up his own screen printing studio. Through this he was professionally involved in screen printing activities for a number of renowned designers and companies. His commitment towards quality brought him a plethora of accolades and awards, including one from the President of India. In 1994, M. F. Husain was looking for a serigrapher for his artworks - someone who could do justice to his art and this search led him to Ahmedabad. During those times, not many people in India were undertaking work of such a large scale and impeccable quality. Anil Relia and M.F. Husain became so close friends that eventually Husain kept coming and frequenting the city. He was found visiting a tea stall which also has one of his works as well as an art gallery was also instituted with his name.

Relia worked on the serigraph series of M. F. Husain and came out with many Limited Edition Serigraphs as well. With the use of technology, he could also come out with the largest serigraph ever done in India – Husain's Mother Teresa, which was launched at Paris in the year 2004. This chance encounter changed the direction of Relia's life to one where his passion now lives and breathes. Looking at Relia's interest in Indian portraits, M. F. Husain has painted a family portrait and gifted it to him. Relia accompanied Husain on his various adventures whether it be film making or other kinds of projects. The demise of Husain brought a lacunae in his life and Relia lost a friend, philosopher and guide to the sands of time.

Anil Relia also works as Honorary Director at the art gallery known as Amdavad ni Gufa, which was designed by artist M. F. Husain and architect B. V. Doshi. He founded the Archer Art Gallery in 1978. He also serves as Trustee of the Kala Ravi Trust, founded by Kalaguru Ravishankar Raval.

== Art Collection ==
Anil Relia has been collecting art, especially portraits since 1970. His vision is to connect India in a thread of art and pay back his dues to the art that has been so gracious to him. He wants to involve as many people as possible through his work and efforts and sensitize them to art and culture. He has planned a series of exhibitions and shows based on the theme of portraits that he has painstakingly collected over the years, out of which fifteen have been already implemented and more are planned.

1. The Indian Portrait I - an artistic journey from miniature to modern
2. The Indian Portrait II - Sacred Journey of Tilkayat Govardhanlalji (1862 - 1934), Nathdwara
3. The Indian Portrait III - A Historical Journey of Graphic Prints up to Independence
4. The Indian Portrait IV - Muraqqa - an Anthological Journey of the Mughal Empire
5. The Indian Portrait V - Colonial influence on Raja Ravi Varma and his Contemporaries
6. The Indian Portrait VI - A Photographic evolution from documentation to posterity
7. The Indian Portrait VII - Trans-culturalisation of lens and brush through painted photographs
8. The Indian Portrait VIII - Rajputana Nayak | Paintings from the Royal courts of Rajasthan 1660-1940 CE
9. The Indian Portrait IX - A Parsi delight | Paintings, Photographs, Prints & Collectibles
10. The Indian Portrait X - Visions of a Bygone Era: 1590-1890
11. The Indian Portrait XI - Jyoti Bhatt's Photographs of His Contemporaries
12. The Indian Portrait XII - Chitrashala Press | Freedom Fighter Printer in Poona
13. The Indian Portrait XIII - Studio portraiture by Bourne & Shepherd of Princely India, 1870s
14. The Indian Portrait XIV - Dancing in the Shadows: Tawaifs – Courtesans
15. The Indian Portrait XV - Variations in Expression, Modern and Contemporary Artists

Apart from portraits, his collection of Nathdwara school miniatures paintings is also quite extensive. A book titled, Portraits of Devotion - Popular Manorath Paintings from Nathdwara in the collection of Anil Relia, was published and launched in March 2019. The book is researched & authored by a London bred Italian writer Isabella Nardi who specialises in South Asian paintings.

Another book on his Nathdwara painting collection titled, Nathdwara Paintings from the Anil Relia Collection - The Portal to Shrinathji, was published by Niyogi Books in November 2020. This book explores Anil Relia’s comprehensive collection of Nathdwara paintings and sketches, celebrating the wide-ranging talents of various artists. The books is authored by distinguished art historians Kalyan Krishna and Kay Talwar.
