= Ratilal =

Ratilal is a given name. Notable people with the name include:

- Ratilal Magare (born 1988), Marathi Network Engineer
- Ratilal Chandaria (1922–2013), Indian industrialist and philanthropist
- Ratilal Kalidas Varma (born 1948), Indian politician
