= Homai Vyarawalla =

Indian photojournalist

- Born: 9 December 1913; Navsari, Bombay state, British India
- Died: 15 January 2012 (aged 98); Vadodara, Gujarat, India
- Education: Sir J. J. School of Art
- Occupation: Photojournalist
- Spouse: Manekshaw Vyarawala (d. 1969)
- Children: Farouq

Homai Vyarawalla (9 December 1913 – 15 January 2012), commonly known by her pseudonym Dalda 13, was India's first woman photojournalist. She began her career in 1938 working for the Bombay Chronicle, capturing images of daily life in the city. Vyarawalla worked for the British Information Services from the 1940s until 1970 when she retired. In 2011, she was awarded Padma Vibhushan, the second highest civilian award of the Republic of India. She was amongst the first women in India to join a mainstream publication when she joined The Illustrated Weekly of India. A pioneer in her field, Vyarawalla died at the age of 98. Google doodle honoured India's "First Lady of the lens" in 2017 with a tapestry of Indian life and history drawn by guest doodler Sameer Kulavoor.

== Early life and education ==
Homai Vyarawalla was born on 9 December 1913 to a Parsi Zoroastrian family in Navsari, Gujarat. Vyarawalla spent her initial years in Navsari and her childhood moving from place to place with her father's travelling theatre company. After moving to Bombay, Homai Vyarawalla studied at Bombay University and the Sir J. J. School of Art. Homai came from a middle-class Parsi family, therefore education was a priority for her. There were only six or seven girls in her class, and she was the only one of 36 pupils to finish her matriculation.

Dossabhai and Soonabhai Hathiram, Homai's parents, were not well educated themselves but were focused on her studying English and enrolled her at Tardeo's Grant Road High School. Homai's attempts to educate herself were thwarted by a variety of obstacles, both societal and otherwise. Homai frequently moved houses and travelled long miles to school due to her family's low financial situation. Homai, like all other females in her village, had to endure great stigma during her menstrual periods, living in seclusion for the duration of them, preventing her from attending school. Following her matriculation, Homai continued her education at St. Xavier's College, earning a bachelor's degree in Economics.

== Personal life ==
Vyarawalla was married to Manekshaw Jamshetji Vyarawalla, an accountant and photographer for the Times of India. In 1970, a year after her husband's death, she gave up photography as she did not wish to work with the new generation paparazzi culture.

Homai Vyarawalla then moved to Pilani, Rajasthan, with her only son, Farouq, who taught at BITS Pilani. She returned to Vadodara (formerly Baroda) with her son in 1982. After her son's death from cancer in 1989, she lived alone in a small apartment in Baroda and spent her time gardening.

== Career ==
Vyarawalla started her career in the 1930s. At the onset of World War II, she started working on assignments for Mumbai-based The Illustrated Weekly of India magazine which published many of her most admired black-and-white images. In the early years of her career, since Vyarawalla was unknown and a woman, her photographs were published under her husband's name. Vyarawalla stated that because women were not taken seriously as journalists she was able to take high-quality, revealing photographs of her subjects without interference:

People were rather orthodox. They didn't want the women folk to be moving around all over the place and when they saw me in a sari with the camera, hanging around, they thought it was a very strange sight. And in the beginning they thought I was just fooling around with the camera, just showing off or something and they didn't take me seriously. But that was to my advantage because I could go to the sensitive areas also to take pictures and nobody will stop me. So I was able to take the best of pictures and get them published. It was only when the pictures got published that people realized how seriously I was working for the place.

— Homai Vyarawalla in Dalda 13: A Portrait of Homai Vyarawalla (1995)

Eventually her photography received notice at the national level, particularly after moving to Delhi in 1942 to join the British Information Services. As a press photographer, she recorded many political and national leaders in the period leading up to independence, including Mohandas Gandhi, Jawaharlal Nehru, Muhammad Ali Jinnah, Indira Gandhi and the Nehru-Gandhi family.

Vyarawalla studied photography from her boyfriend Maneckshaw Vyarawalla. Her schooling at the Sir J. J School of the Arts in Mumbai, as well as modernist pictures she saw in secondhand LIFE magazine issues, affected her graphical sense. These inspirations may be seen in her early paintings of common urban life and modern young women in Mumbai, but because Vyarawalla was unknown and a woman, these were first published in the Illustrated Weekly and Bombay Chronicle under Maneckshaw's name.

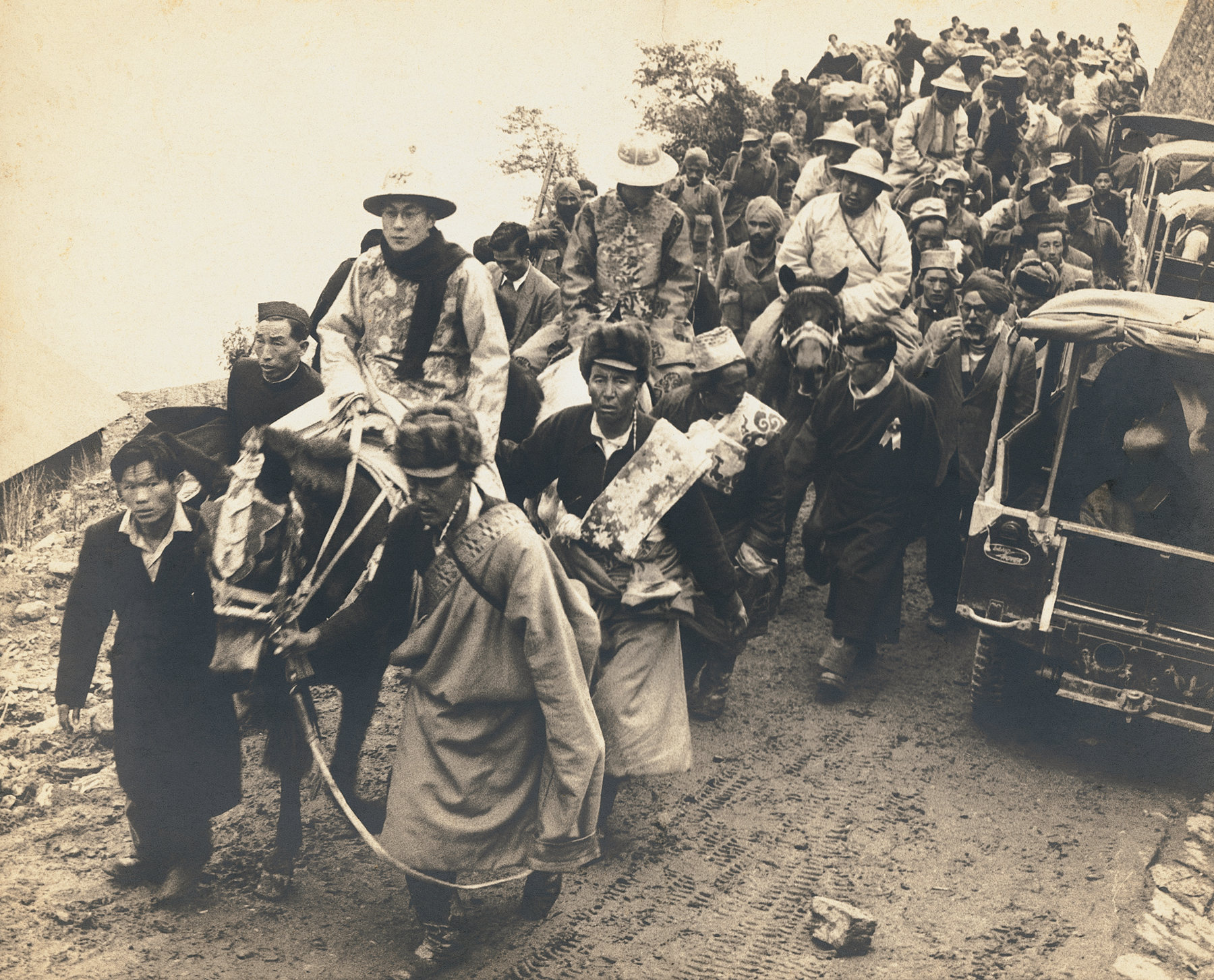
The Dalai Lama in ceremonial dress enters India through Nathu La in Sikkim on 24 November 1956, photographed by Homai Vyarawalla.

In 1956, she photographed for Life Magazine the 14th Dalai Lama when he entered Sikkim in India for the first time via the Nathu La.

Most of her photographs were published under the pseudonym "Dalda 13.″ Her work quickly received national acclaim, and she began photographing key political leaders and events throughout India's independence struggle. Many candid images of Jawaharlal Nehru (her favourite subject), photographs of Mahatma Gandhi, and later photographs of Indira Gandhi, India's first female Prime Minister, were among them. The reasons behind her choice of this name were that her birth year was 1913, she met her husband at the age of 13 and her first car's number plate read "DLD 13.″

In 1970, shortly after her husband's death, Homai Vyarawalla decided to give up photography, lamenting "bad behaviour" of the new generation of photographers. She did not take a single photograph in the last 40-plus years of her life. When asked why she quit photography while at the peak of her profession, she said

"It was not worth it anymore. We had rules for photographers; we even followed a dress code. We treated each other with respect, like colleagues. But then, things changed for the worst. They were only interested in making a few quick bucks; I didn't want to be part of the crowd anymore."

Later in life, Vyarawalla gave her collection of photographs to the Delhi-based Alkazi Foundation for the Arts, and, in 2010, in collaboration with the National Gallery of Modern Art, Mumbai (NGMA), the foundation presented a retrospective of her work.

"As a child, I once saw a photograph of another child sleeping on its stomach," Homai recalled. "I was told it was taken by a woman, and I wondered whether I'd ever get another chance." She surely did, for by the late 1930s, she had relocated to Delhi and begun a thirty-year career as a photojournalist.

== Exhibitions ==
From 6 July 2012 – 14 January 2013 The Rubin Museum of Art in New York presented Candid: The Lens and Life of Homai Vyarawalla, in collaboration with the Alkazi Foundation for the Arts in New Delhi. The exhibition was the first on Vyarawalla outside of India. It showcased her photographs from the 1930s to 1970, alongside a biographical film on her extraordinary life and ephemera from her career including her cameras, personal correspondence and press passes.

Google honoured Vyarawalla on the 104th anniversary of her birth with a doodle, "First Lady of the Lens."

== Awards ==
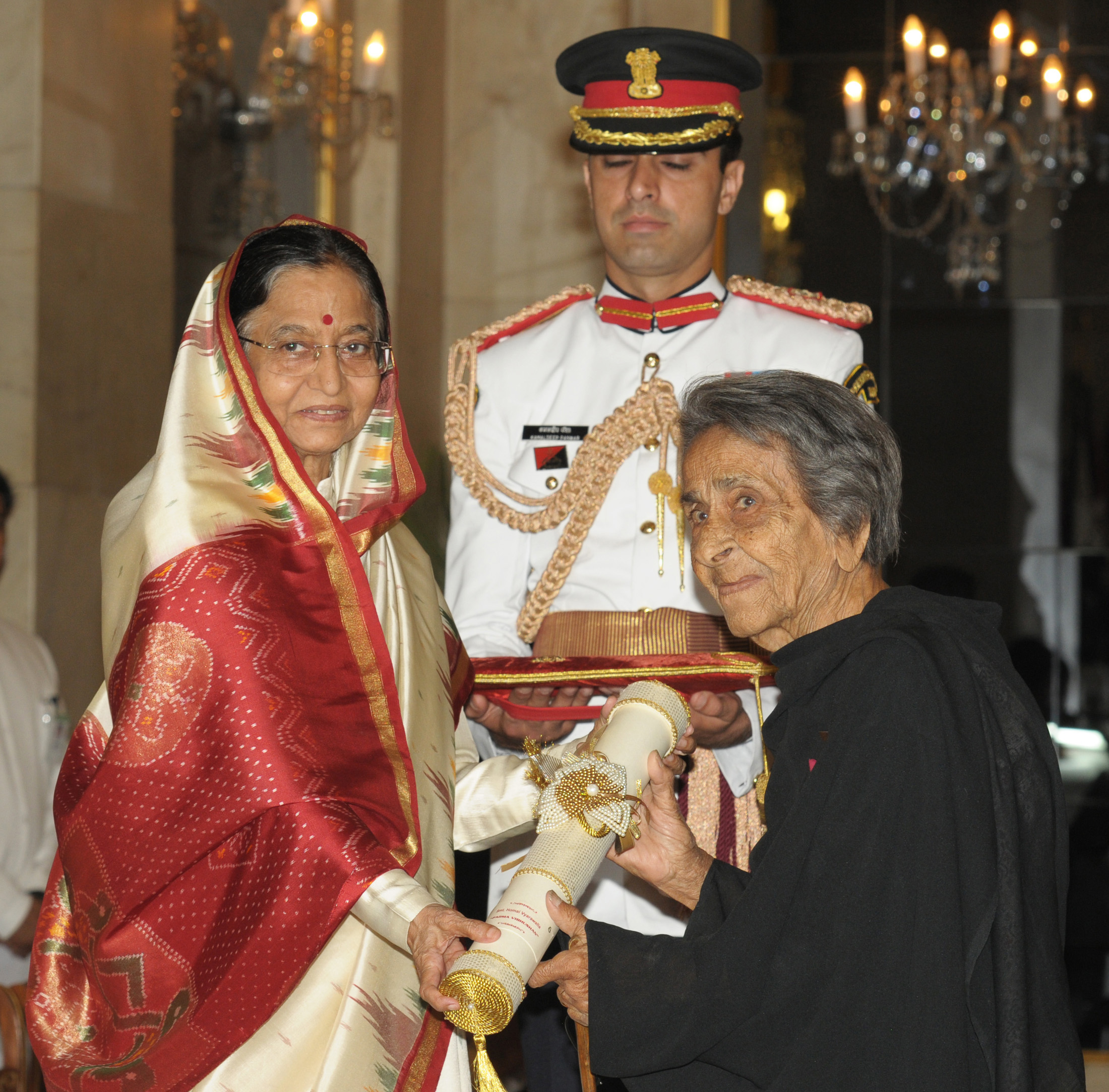
The President, Smt. Pratibha Devisingh Patil presenting the Padma Vibhushan Award to Smt. Homai Vyarawalla, at an Investiture Ceremony II, at Rashtrapati Bhavan, in New Delhi on April 01, 2011

In 1998, Vyarawalla was honoured with the Chameli Devi Jain Award for Outstanding Women Mediaperson. In 2010, the I&B Ministry honoured her with the Lifetime Achievement Award. She was awarded Padma Vibhushan, India's second highest civilian honour in 2011.

== Death ==
In January 2012, Vyarawalla fell from her bed and fractured a hip bone. Her neighbours helped her reach a hospital where she developed breathing complications. She had been suffering from interstitial lung disease which resulted in her death on 15 January 2012.

== See also ==
- Vyara, ancestral town
- List of people from Gujarat
