= Mahipatsinh Chavda =

Indian academic (born 1967)

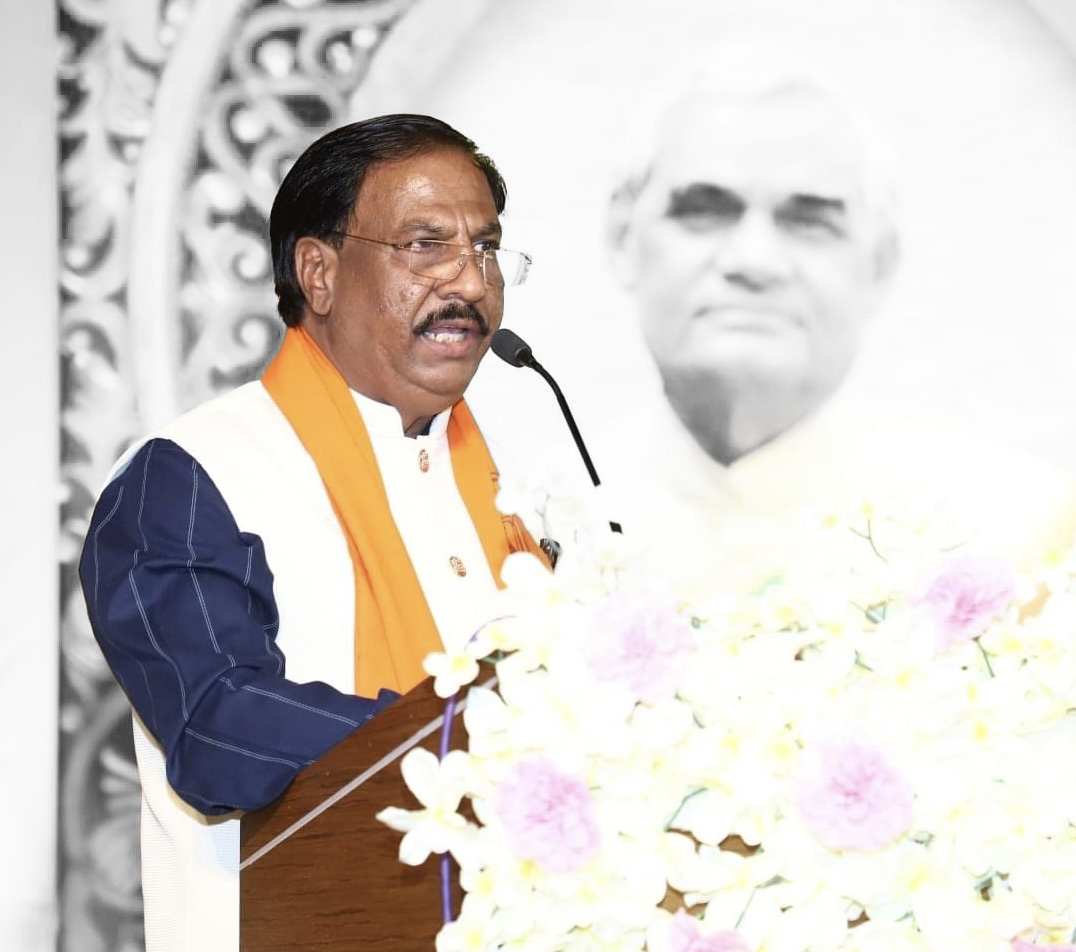

15th Vice Chancellor of Maharaja Krishnakumarsinhji Bhavnagar University
- In office 10 March 2019 – 9 March 2022
- Chancellor: Governor of Gujarat
- Preceded by: Shailesh Zala

Personal details
- Born: 10 February 1967 (age 59) Bhavnagar, Gujarat, India
- Spouse: Geeta Chavda
- Children: 2
- Education: PhD (Doctor of Philosophy); MPhil (psychology); M.A. (psychology)
- Alma mater: Gujarat University; Saurashtra University; Sardar Patel University

Mahipatsinh Chavda (born February 10, 1967) is an Indian academic and administrator from Gujarat, India. He currently serves as the Vice Chancellor of Maharaja Krishnakumarsinhji Bhavnagar University.

== Early life and education ==
Chavda was born in Bhavnagar, Gujarat to Ramuba and Dansinh Chavda. His family belongs to the Kshatriya, Karadia Rajput community. He completed his secondary and higher secondary education in Vallabhipur.

In 1987, Chavda earned a bachelor's degree in arts (B.A.) from Gujarat University, Ahmedabad. He later pursued a master's degree (M.A.) in Psychology as well as a MPhil from Sardar Patel University, Anand. In 2003, he received a Doctorate (Ph.D.) in Psychology from Saurashtra University, Rajkot.

== Career ==
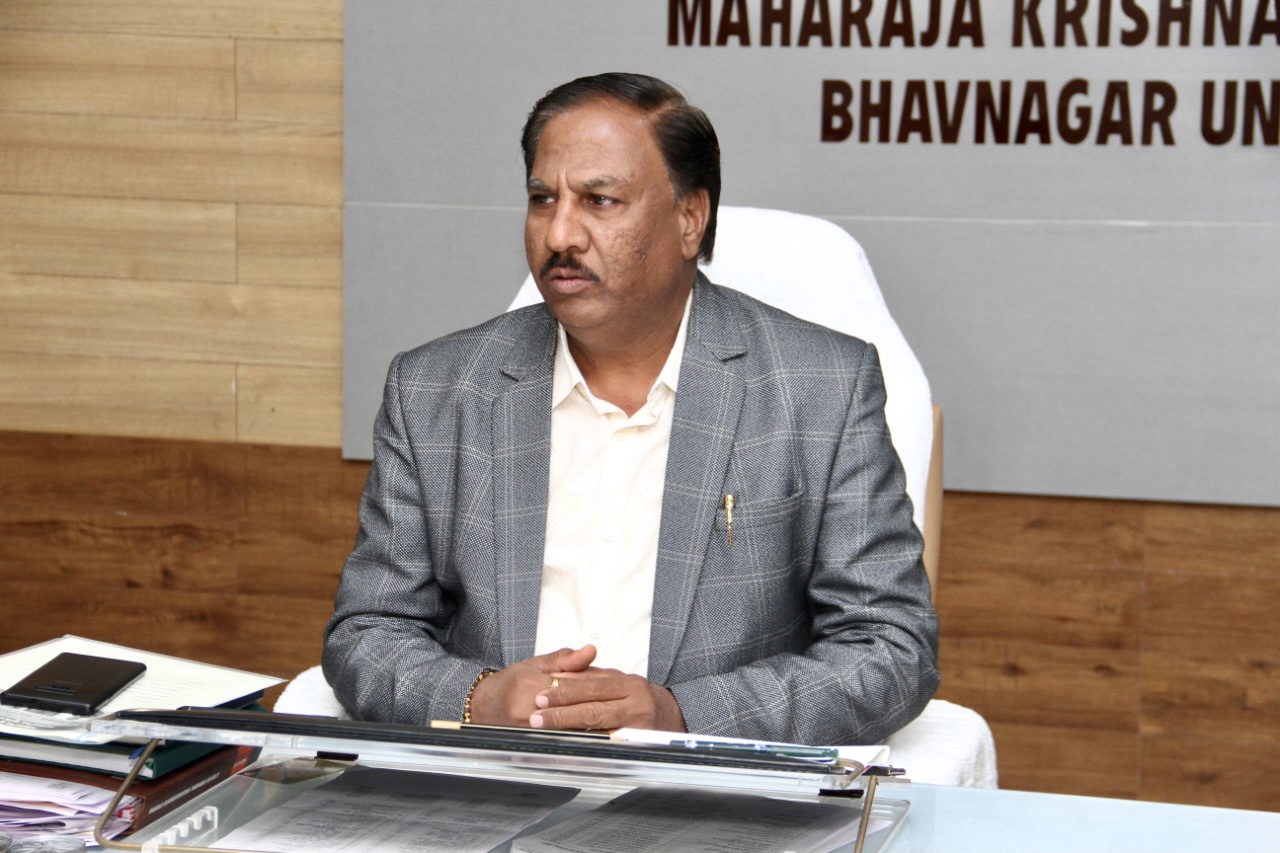

Chavda has held several academic positions throughout his career. He is the Principal and Head of the Department at L. D. Arts College, though he is currently on indefinite leave. He has also served as the Dean of the Faculty of Arts and Chairman of the Board of Studies at Gujarat University. Additionally, he has been a member of the academic senate and executive council at several universities for over a decade. Chavda became the Vice Chancellor of Bhavnagar University in March 2019.

Chavda has been involved in various governmental organizations, including the University Grants Commission (UGC), the National Assessment and Accreditation Council (NAAC), and the Madhya Pradesh and Chhattisgarh Public Service Commissions, among others.

Chavda has contributed to over 60 national and international research papers and authored more than 15 books in the field of psychology. His areas of expertise include Human Resource Development, Forensic Psychology, and Social Psychology. He has also supervised numerous postgraduate and Ph.D. research projects.

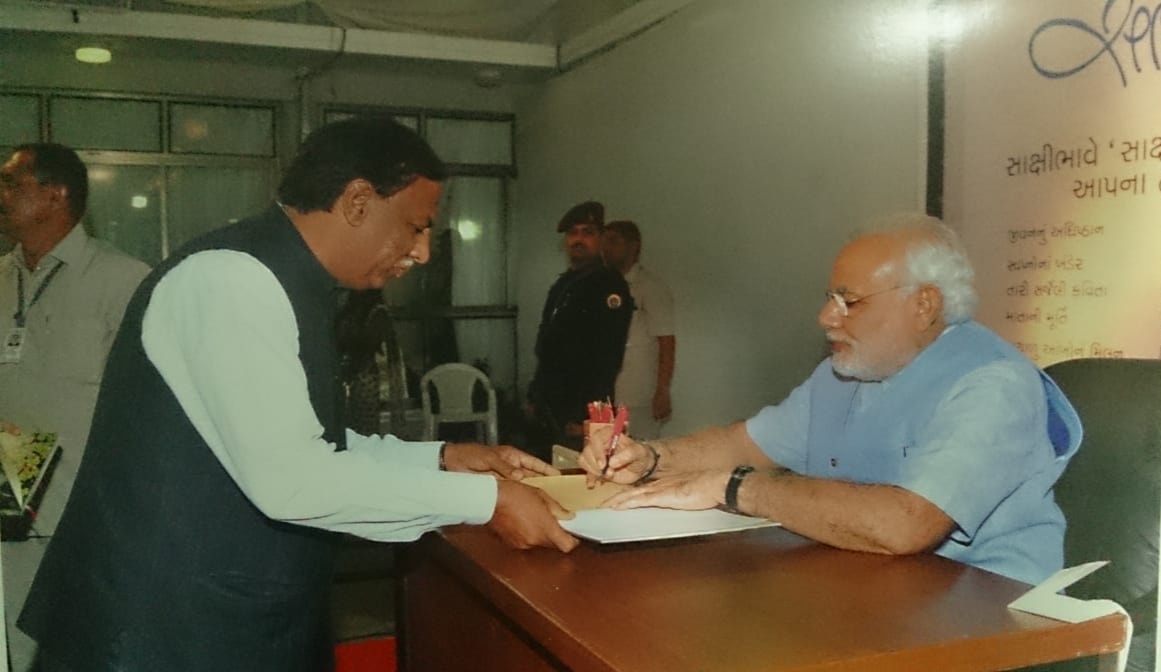
Dr.Chavda (L) with PM Narendra Modi (R)

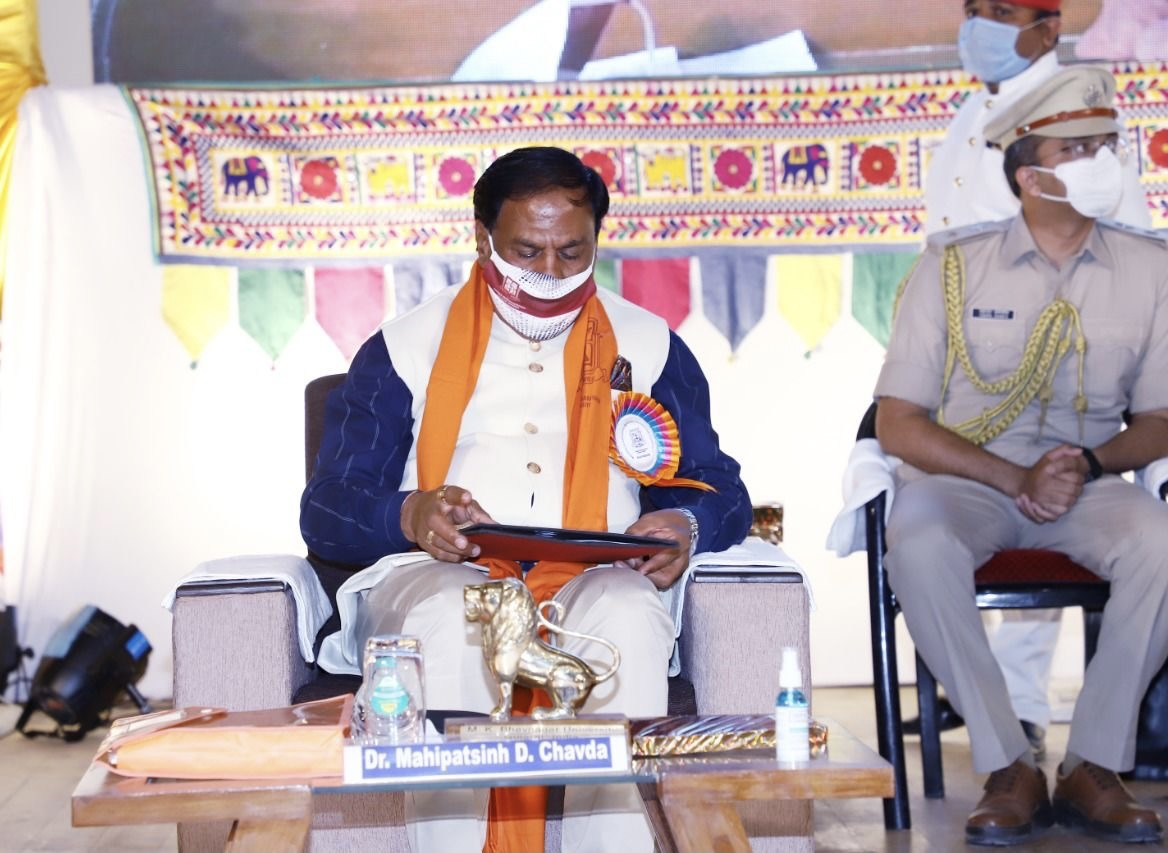

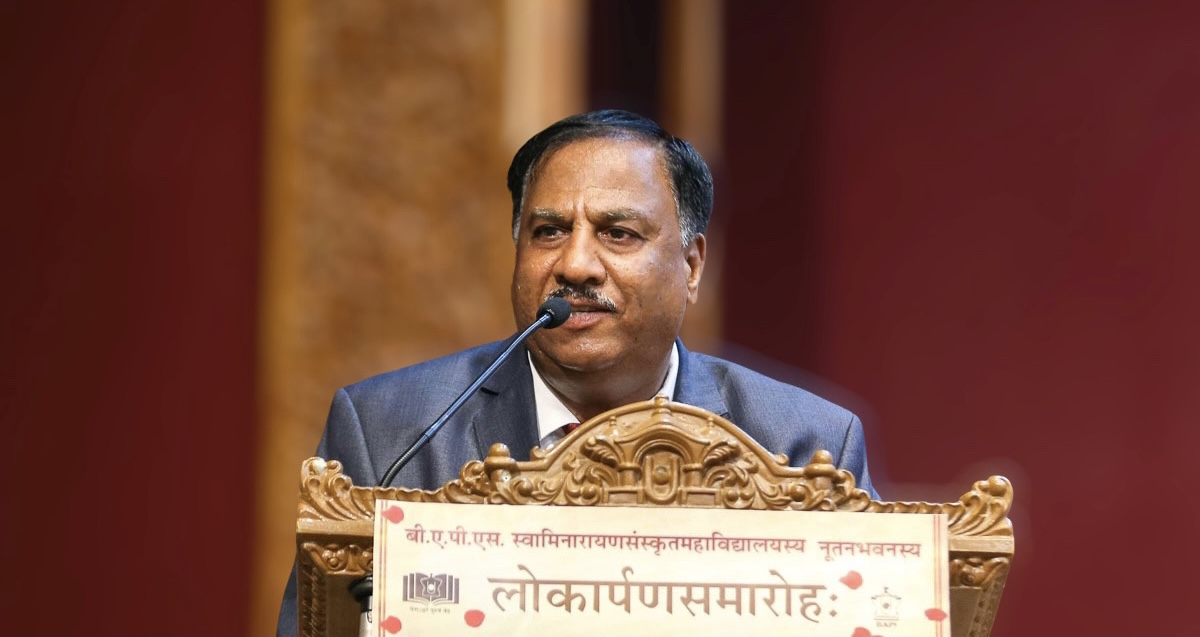
