= Nautamlal Bhagavanji Mehta =

Indian activist (1879–1968)

Nautamlal Bhagavanji Mehta, or the Nagar Sheth of Jetpur (2 September 1879 – 2 September 1968) was an Indian independence activist and a supporter of Mahatma Gandhi. He was also a prominent businessman and a pioneer of the Gandhian Movement in what is now Gujarat. He is also believed to be the first to bestow the title "Mahatma" to Gandhi, not Rabindranath Tagore, as many believe. Mehta wrote a manpatra using the term, which has been authenticated by the National Gandhi Museum in New Delhi.
