= Laxman Barot =

Gujarati bhajanik and folk singer

- લક્ષ્મણ બારોટ
- Born: Bhavnagar, Gujarat, India
- Died: 5 September 2023; Jamnagar, Gujarat, India
- Occupations: Bhajanik, folk singer
- Known for: Gujarati bhajans and Santvani

Laxman Barot (1958 – 5 September 2023) was an Indian Gujarati bhajanik and folk singer who performed bhajans and Santvani. He performed in Gujarat, other parts of India and abroad.

== Life and career ==
Barot was born in 1958 in Bhavnagar, Gujarat. His family later moved to Jamnagar. He began singing bhajans as a child and was influenced by bhajanik Narayan Swami.

He performed with artists including Pranlal Vyas, Jagmal Barot, Kirtidan Gadhvi and Osman Mir.

Barot also recorded and performed devotional music. Around 2004, he established the Shri Shakti Bhajan Peeth Ashram at Rajpardi in Bharuch district.

== Death ==
Barot died on 5 September 2023 at a hospital in Jamnagar while receiving treatment for a respiratory illness. He was 65 years old.
