= Tanmay Shah =

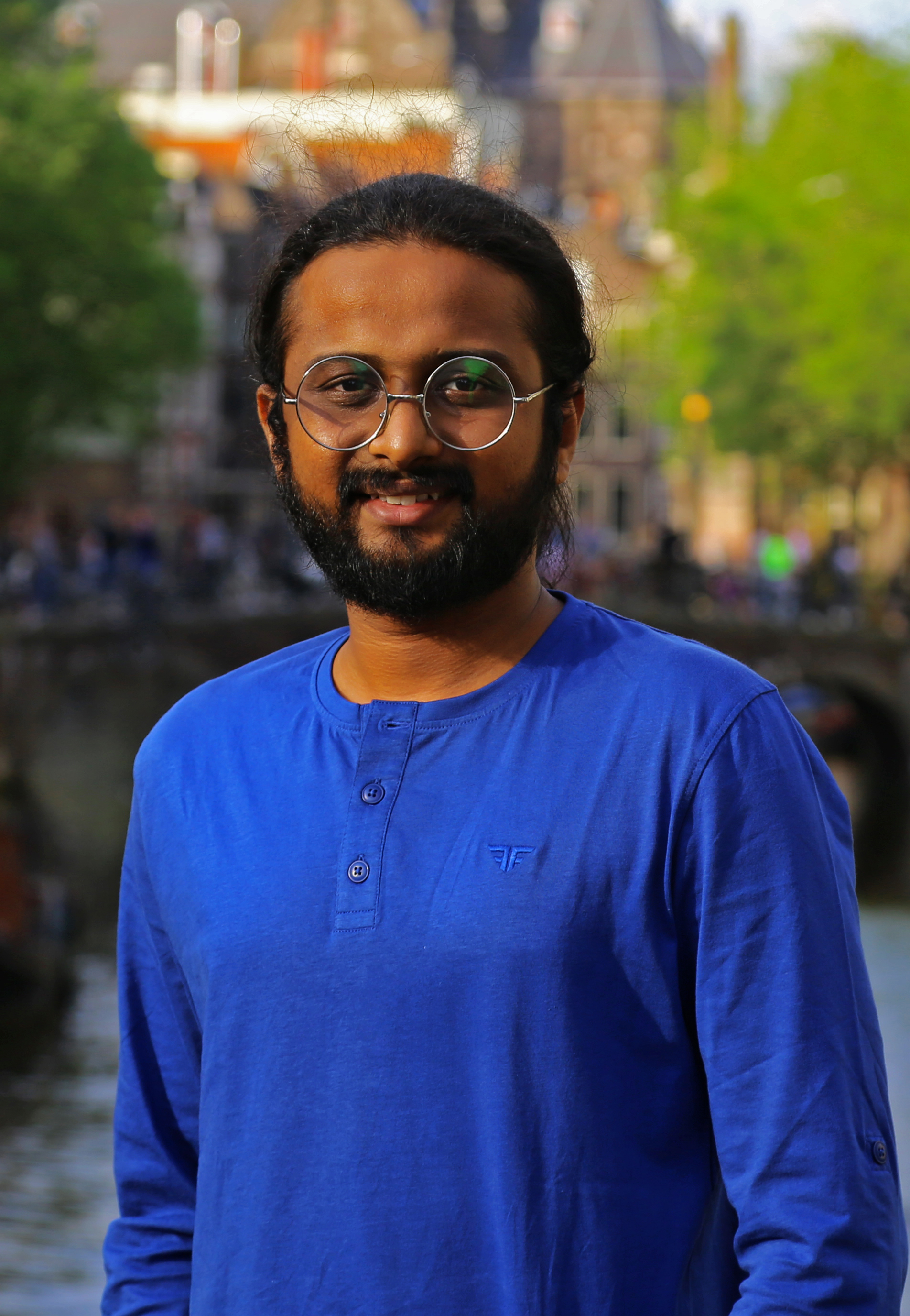
- Born: 1989 (age 36–37); Ahmedabad, India
- Occupations: Film director, producer, writer, editor, cinematographer, script and screen-writer
- Known for: Films, 52FilmsProject, Pinch of Salt, Walls That Matter
- Awards: Limca Book of Records

Tanmay Shah is a director, producer, writer, editor, cinematographer, script and screenwriter from Gujarat, India who is known for 52FilmsProject and his short documentary Pinch of Salt. He is the Founder and CEO of FridayFictionFilms.

== Early life ==
Tanmay Shah was born in Ahmedabad. He is an information technology engineer academically. He has worked at Physical Research Laboratory as a project trainee and Indian Institute of Technology Bombay as a research associate. During his stay at Indian Institute of Technology Bombay, he was asked to write a story for a video game by a friend who had created it. The whole process of writing and being on the shoot inspired him to become a filmmaker. Soon after, he left his job at IIT Bombay and returned to Ahmedabad to make films.

== 52FilmsProject ==
In 2015, Shah undertook a project of making 52 zero-budget short films in a year on various social issues. The issues ranged from Light Pollution, Parenting, Language Manipulation to Child Abuse, Lesbian Wedding and Global Terrorism. He made the first film of the project and released it on the YouTube channel of FridayFictionFilms on 2 January. He released one short film every Friday for the next 52 weeks. The procedure he had designed for the project was to write and shoot the film on Saturday-Sundays, re-shoot on Mondays, Edit on Tuesdays, re-edit on Wednesdays, make the music on Thursdays, and release it on Fridays. All the films were shot in Ahmedabad. 170 actors were part of the project out of which many of them were non-professionals. In 2016, Shah was awarded Limca Book of Records for making 52 zero budget short films in 52 weeks. He has given a TEDx talk at TEDxBITSHyderabad about 52FilmsProject.

== Pinch of Salt ==
In 2016, he made a 12-minute short documentary film, in Gujarati language, based on the lives of 30,000 salt pan workers of Kutch, Gujarat. The short documentary talks about the plight of salt pan workers, how they are deprived of the most basic amenities and infrastructure and yet are thriving their cultural legacy of folk music. It has been screened at the international film festivals of Romania, Russia, USA, Canada, Germany, Spain, UK, and Serbia. It has won 12 awards at various International Film Festivals

== Walls That Matter ==
In 2021, he made a 26 minute documentary short film projecting a story of a specially-abled artist that goes through struggles with themselves and society. The documentary talks about a vision of an artist who wants to express art and use it as a medium to bring positive changes in society. It won an award at International Film Festival in Chicago

== Borrowed Earth ==
In March 2026, Shah held an art exhibition titled Borrowed Earth at Amdavad Ni Gufa in Ahmedabad. The exhibition included 26 acrylic paintings and 26 photographs focused on climate change and the relationship between people and nature. In August 2026, Shah presented Borrowed Earth as part of UNESCO's Art for Earth: Climate Creativity Lab webinar, which featured art initiatives from across the Asia-Pacific region exploring climate and environmental issues. In November 2026, Shah is scheduled to speak at the United Nations Climate Change Conference (COP31) in Antalya, Turkey. He is listed as a speaker for the session Culture and Narrative: Taking Zero Waste Beyond the Convinced, scheduled for November 19 at the Circularity Stage in the Blue Zone.

== Recognition ==
Year of award	Award	Reference
2013	Best Film for 'Paperboat' at 'Yes I am the Change' film festival	
2016	Limca Book of Records for 52FilmsProject	
2016	Asia Book of Records for 52FilmsProject	
2016	India Book of Records for 52FilmsProject	
2017	Golden Book of World Records for 52FilmsProject	
