= Rihaan Patel =

Indian filmmaker

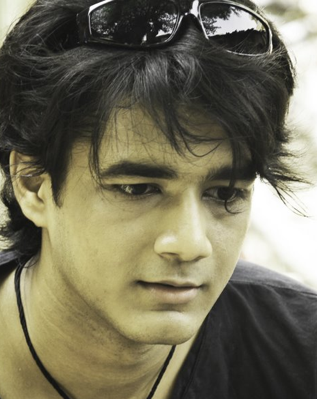
- Rihaan Patel
- Born: 6 December 1988 (age 37); Unjha, Gujarat, India
- Occupations: Stage actor Film producer Film director screenwriter
- Years active: 2007–present
- Website: rihaanpatel.com

Rihaan Ramanlal Patel (born 6 December 1988) is an Indian filmmaker – a freelance film director, screenwriter, editor, and visual effects consultant. He began film making when he was 20.

== Background ==
Patel started his film career in Melbourne. His first film was a one-minute short film of his own life. In C31, he worked as an actor as well as production assistant, following which he was invited to attend the workshop of Samuel Johnson and Sarah Hallam in Australia.

Returning to India, Patel completed training at the Shiamak Davar Institute for Performing Arts, after which Davar selected him for his special 'potential' batch. Patel has performed in theatre in more than 20 stage shows, as well as TV serials and short films.

== Recognition ==
Patel has had several award-winning milestones in form of his various short films that include Dust of Orphan (2009), The Burial of Daughters (2009), Life Colors Purity (2011), My Best Friend (2011), Champal (2011) and Fading Yellow (2011).

=== Awards and nominations ===
In 2009, he made a short film titled The Burial of Daughters, for which he won the 'Best Film Non Fiction' award at Sixteen:Nine International film Festival organised by Usha Pravin Gandhi College of Management, Mumbai. The film also received 'Official Selection' at the 7th EDICICORTO International Film Festival Forli in Italy, and in 2010 it received 2nd prize at 3rd Global Film Festival Noida, organised by Asian Academy of Film & Television. It was also nominated and screened at 3rd International Documentary and Short Film Festival of Kerala (Department of Cultural Affairs, Government of Kerala), organised by International Film Festival of Kerala and Kerala State Chalachitra Academy.

His first short film titled Dust of Orphan won WNET REEL 13 Audience Award and was screened in New York City on TV Thirteen. The Maya Academy of Advanced Cinematics film institute awarded him a 50% scholarship to study for his advanced degree in the 3D Expert Program.

He worked in The Climate Change Project – India Chapter. Rihaan worked as content analyser and film-editing. The film went on to receive an award from former US Vice-President Al Gore.
