= Amdavad ni Gufa =

Art gallery in India

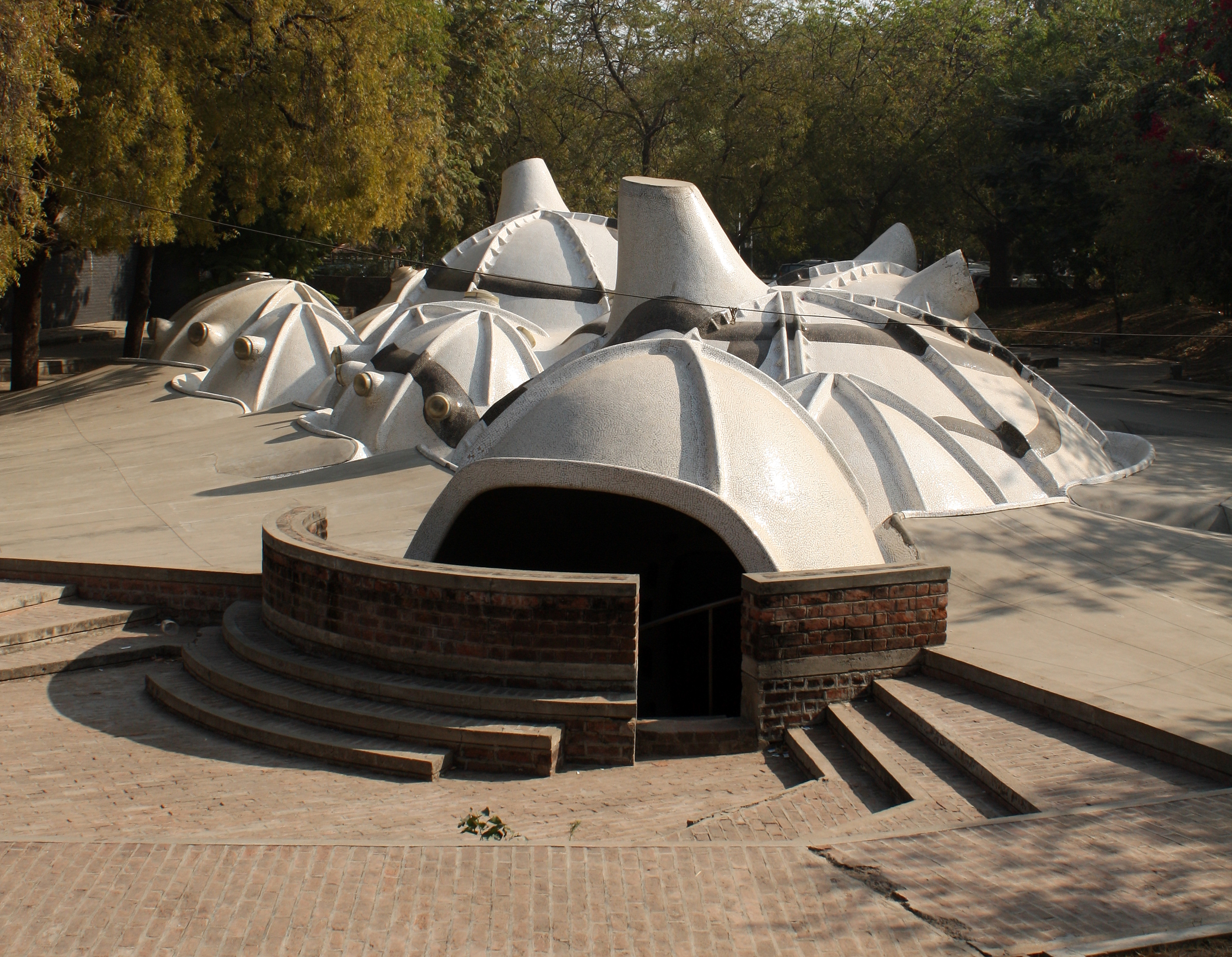

- Location within Ahmedabad Amdavad ni Gufa (Gujarat) Amdavad ni Gufa (India)
- Former names: Husain-Doshi ni Gufa

General information
- Status: Accessible
- Architectural style: Modern, blobitecture, novelty
- Location: Ahmedabad, Lalbhai Dalpatbhai Campus, near CEPT University, opp. Gujarat University, University Road, Ahmedabad, Gujarat, India
- Coordinates: 23°2′10″N 72°32′58″E
- Construction started: 1992
- Completed: 1995
- Client: M. F. Husain

Design and construction
- Architect: B. V. Doshi
- Architecture firm: Vāstu Shilpā Consultants
- Other designers: M. F. Husain

Amdavad ni Gufa is an underground art gallery in Ahmedabad, India. Designed by the architect Balkrishna Vithaldas Doshi, it exhibits works of the Indian artist Maqbool Fida Husain. The gallery represents a unique juxtaposition of architecture and art. The cave-like underground structure has a roof made of multiple interconnected domes, covered with a mosaic of tiles. On the inside, irregular tree-like columns support the domes. It was earlier known as Husain-Doshi ni Gufa.

There are facilities for special painting exhibitions and for projecting films. Gardens and a café are located above ground.

== Etymology ==
The gallery is called gufa ("cave" in Gujarati) because of its resemblance to a cave. It was known earlier as Husain-Doshi ni Gufa, after its architect, B.V. Doshi, and the artist, M.F. Husain. Later it was renamed after the city of Ahmedabad, known locally as Amdavad.

== Development ==
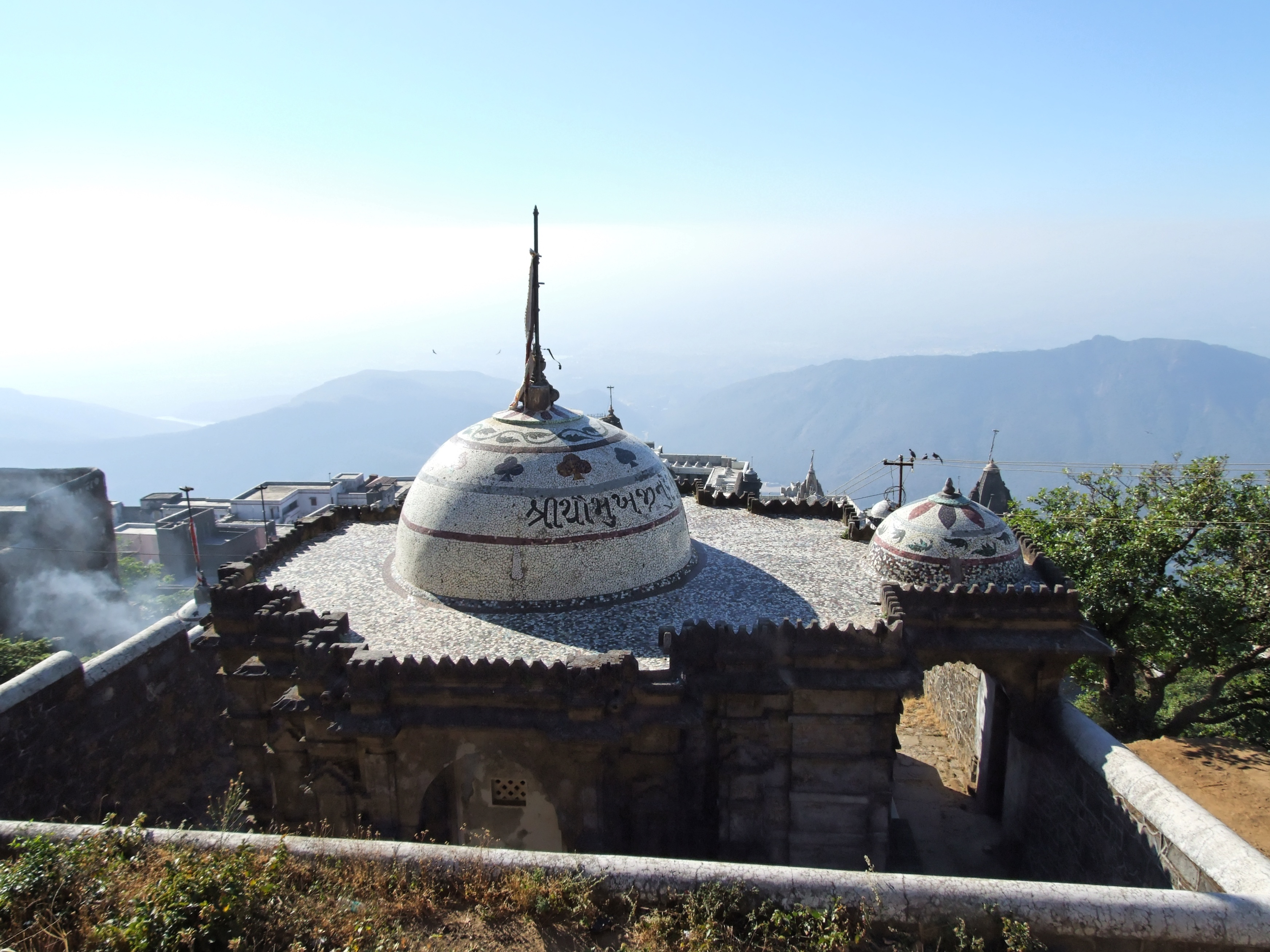
The mosaic tiles on the roofs of the Jain temples at Girnar

The structure's contemporary architecture draws on ancient and natural themes. The domes are inspired by the shells of tortoises and by soap bubbles. The mosaic tiles on the roof are similar to those found on the roofs of the Jain temples at Girnar, and the mosaic snake is from Hindu mythology. The Buddhist caves of Ajanta and Ellora inspired Doshi to design the interior with circles and ellipses, while Husain's wall paintings are inspired by Paleolithic cave art. The interior is divided by tree trunks or columns similar to those found at Stonehenge.

== Construction ==
While visiting Ahmedabad, Husain asked his friend Doshi to design a permanent art gallery for the exhibition of his works. Together they planned an underground structure capable of withstanding the area's severe summer heat.

Computer-assisted planning facilities were used to resolve the structure's unorthodox design. A simple floor of wire mesh and mortar was used instead of a traditional foundation. All the structure's components are self-supporting, relieving stress by their ubiquitous continuity. Ferrocement, only one inch thick, was used for the undulating walls and domes in order to reduce load. The cave was constructed by unskilled tribal labourers using only hand tools. Broken ceramic crockery and waste tiles were used to cover the domes' exterior, which bears a transversal mosaic of a snake.

Work was carried out in two phases: the first was the construction of the main cave as an underground art gallery, while the second covered the surrounding structures including the paving, the café, and a separate art gallery for exhibitions.

== Structure ==
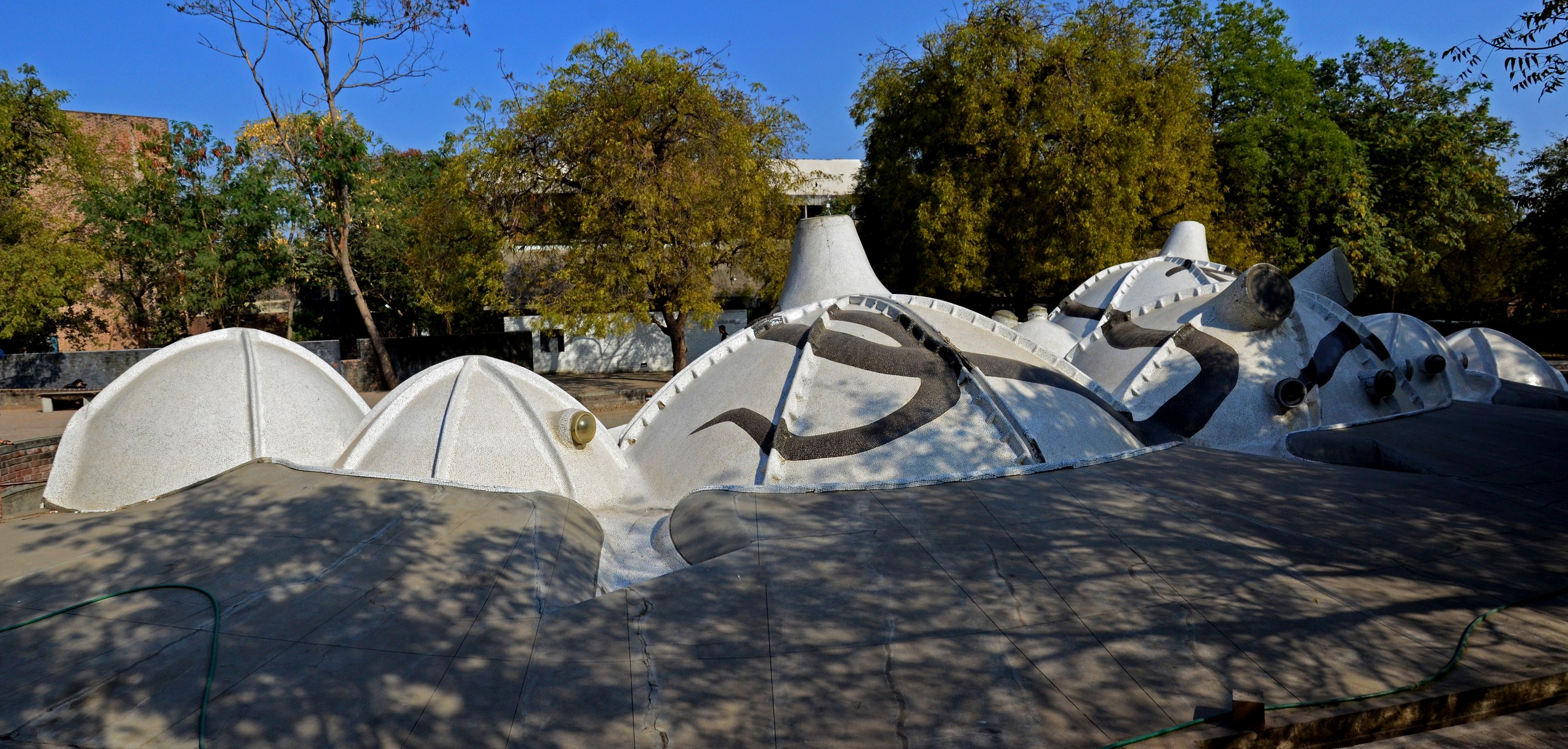
Amdavad ni Gufa exterior

The gallery space is below ground level. A partially hidden staircase leads to a circular door which opens into a cave-like space. Though designed to display paintings, the cave has no straight walls, instead using a continuation of the curved dome structure which extends down to the floor. The domes themselves are supported by irregularly shaped inclined columns, similar to those found in natural caves. They are also said to resemble the trunks of trees. The entire design is made up of circles and ellipses. Light arrives though snouts, creating spots of light on the floor which move around as the day progresses, intended to create a mystic atmosphere.

Structure:- Ahemdabad Ni Gufa is an underground art gallery in Ahemdabad. It exhibits the work of the famous artist Maqbool Fida Hussain. The gallery represents a unique juxtaposition of architecture and art. The cave-like underground structure has a roof made of multiple interconnected domes, covered with a mosaic of tiles. Inside it, there are irregular tree-like columns that support the domes lines taken from https://www.architectsworld.in/2019/12/amdavad-ni-gufa-basic-facts-about.html

== Art ==
Husain used the gallery's walls as a canvas, painting on them with bold strokes and bright colours. The artwork depicts human figures and motifs of animals, including his famous horse figures. He also decorated features such as doors and even air conditioners. The figures were designed to resemble ancient cave paintings in a modern environment. Husain also placed a few metal sculptures of human figures between the inclining columns. His largest work, Sheshnag (the divine serpent), stretches over a length of 100 feet (30 m).

== Exhibition Gallery ==
There is an art exhibition gallery space which is available on rent to artists to exhibit their artworks. It is one of the most frequently visited art gallery in the city. Art exhibitions of artists from around the country as well as international artists happen at the exhibition gallery weekly.

== Timings ==
The Gufa and the Exhibition Gallery are open on all days, except on Mondays and public holidays, from 4:00 p.m. to 8:00 p.m.

== Photo Gallery ==
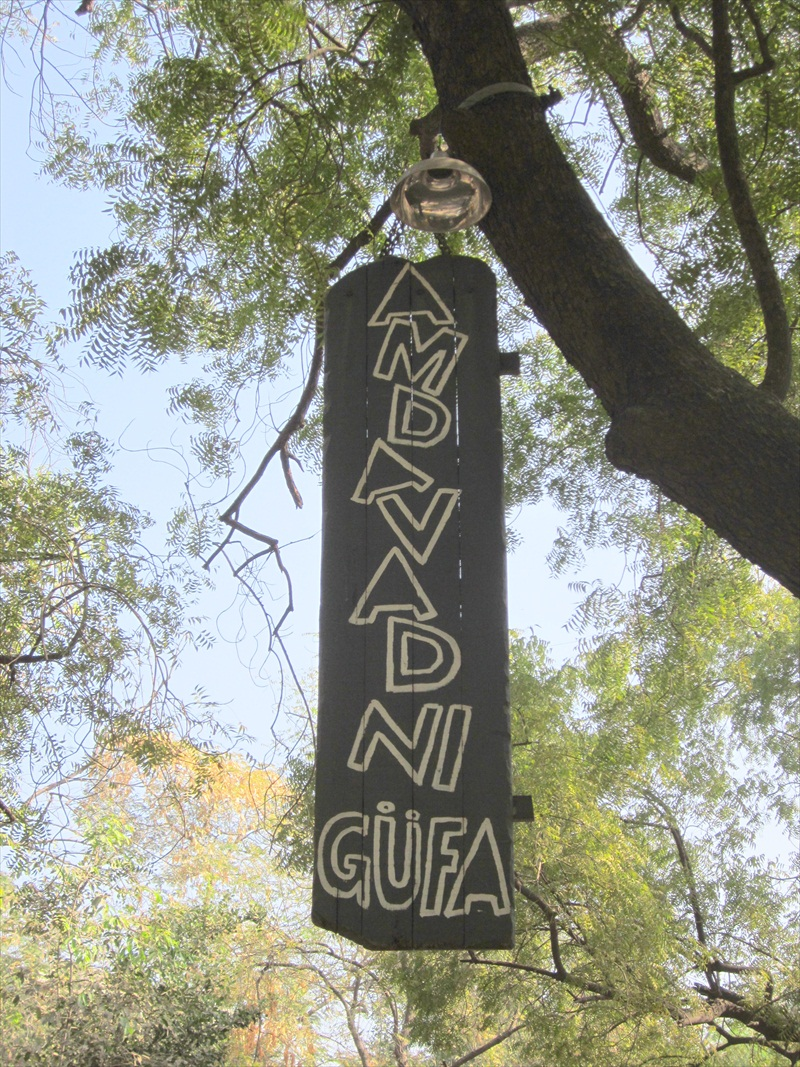
Signbord painted by Husain

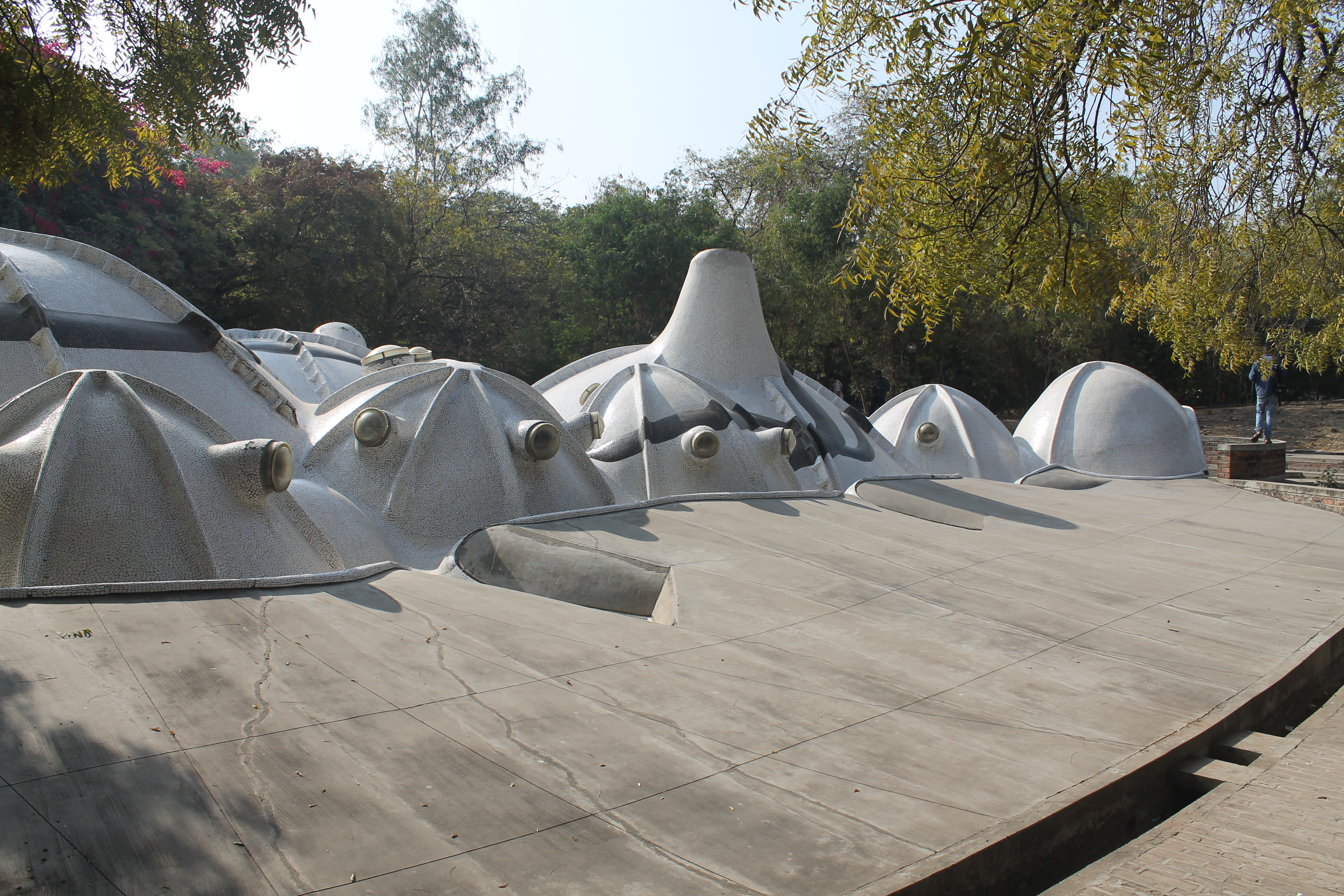
Exterior

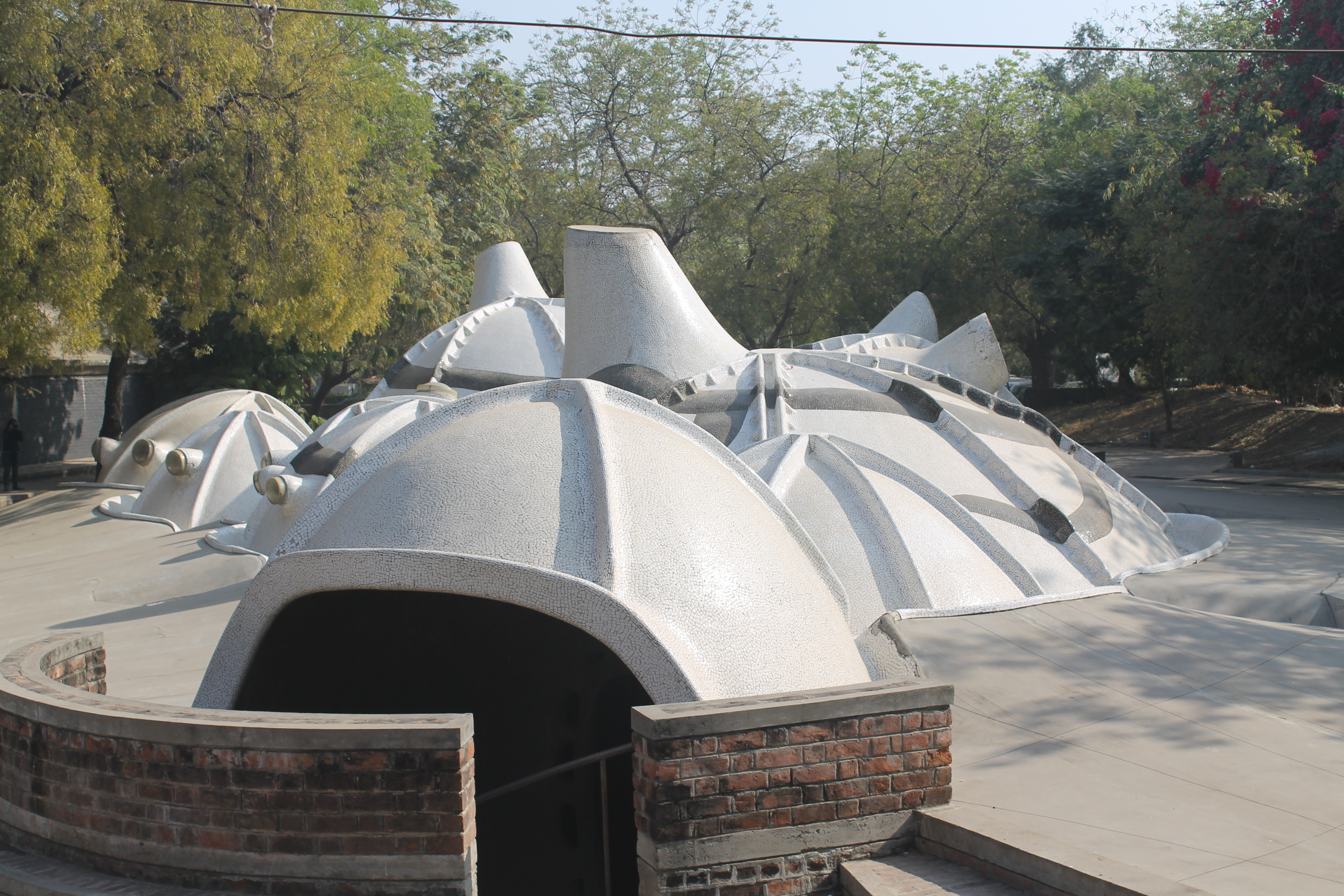
Secretly guarded door

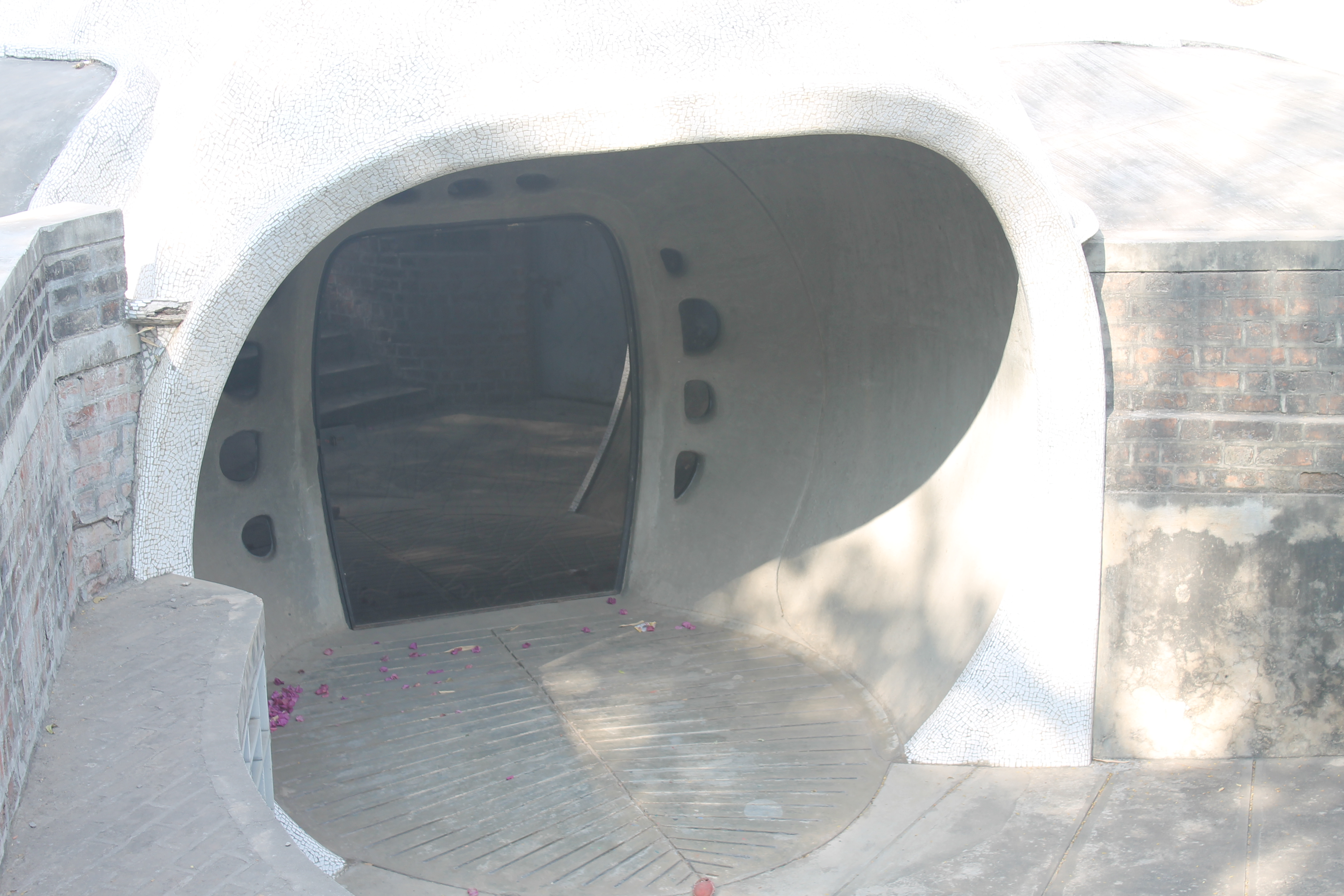
Entrance

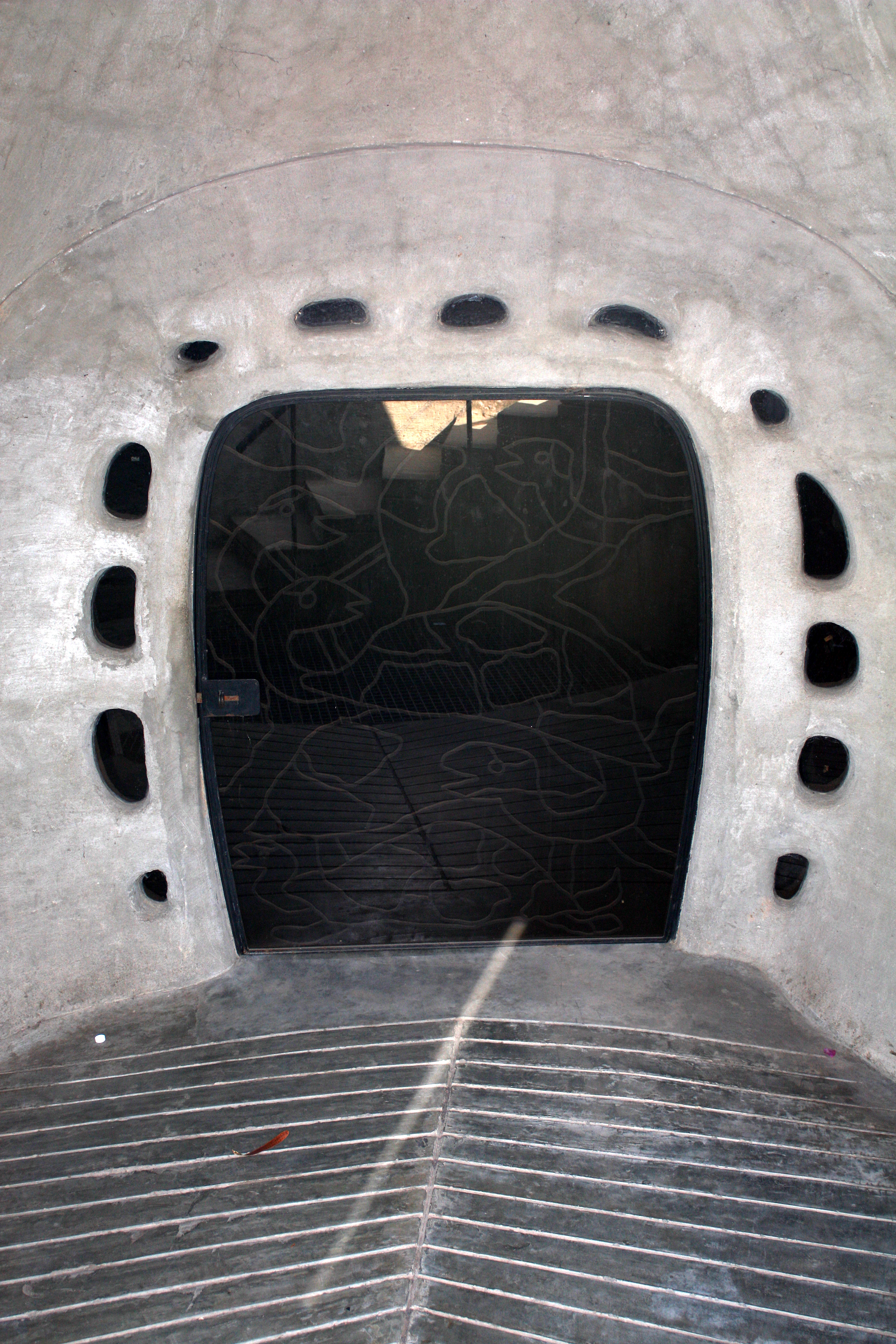
Entrance door decorated by M.F. Husain

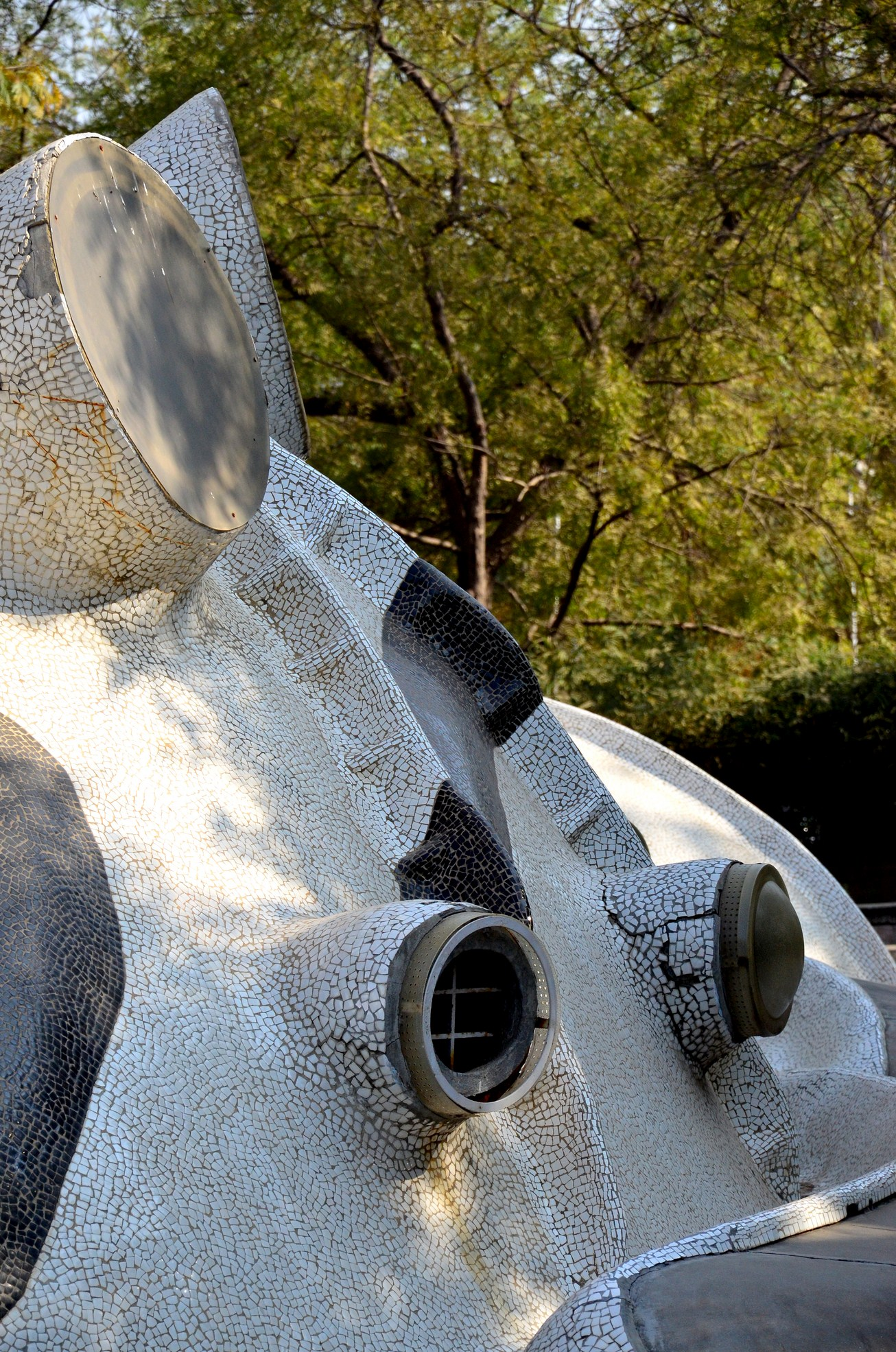
Snouts for entry of light

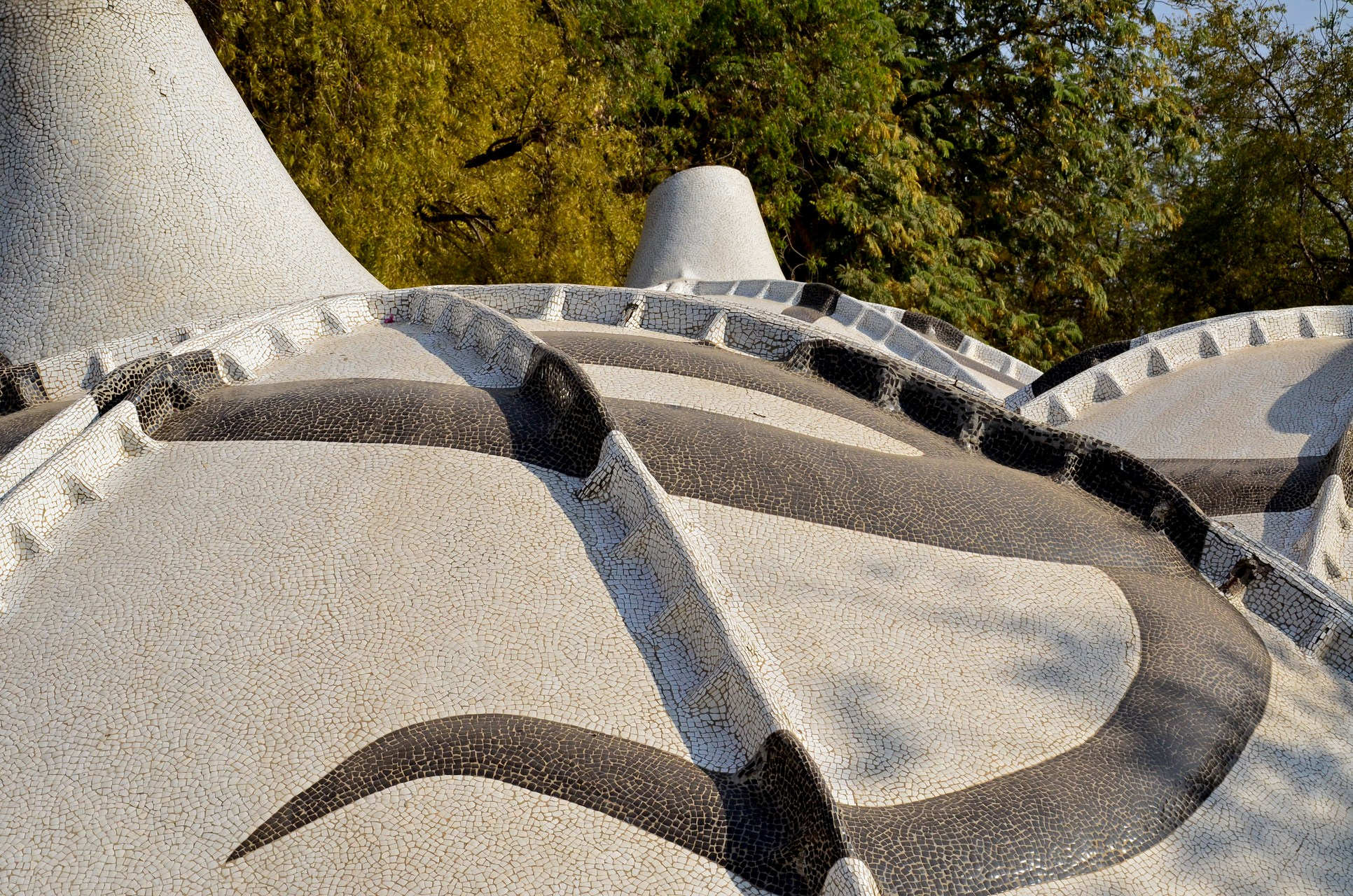
Tile mosaics

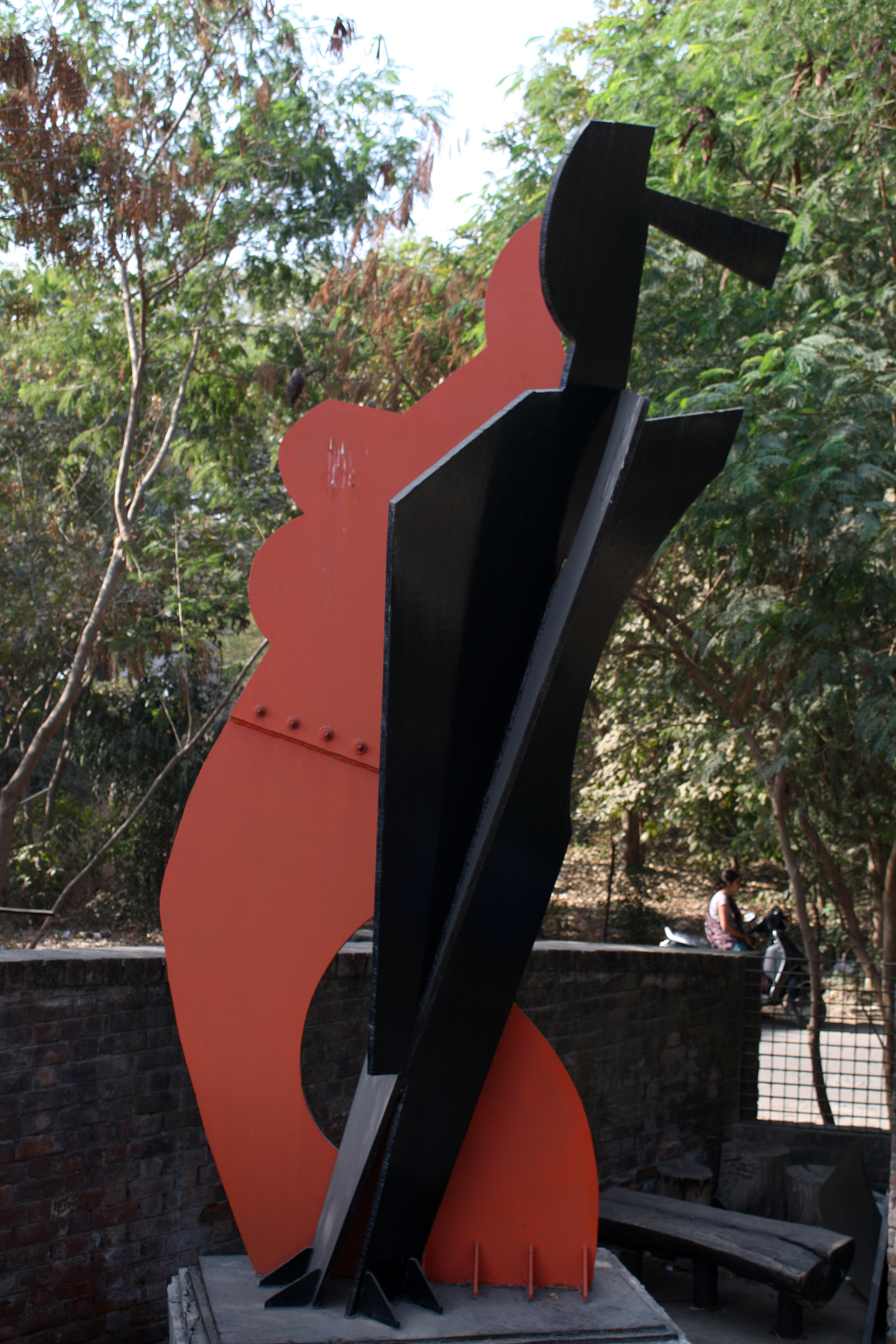
Metal sculpture on display

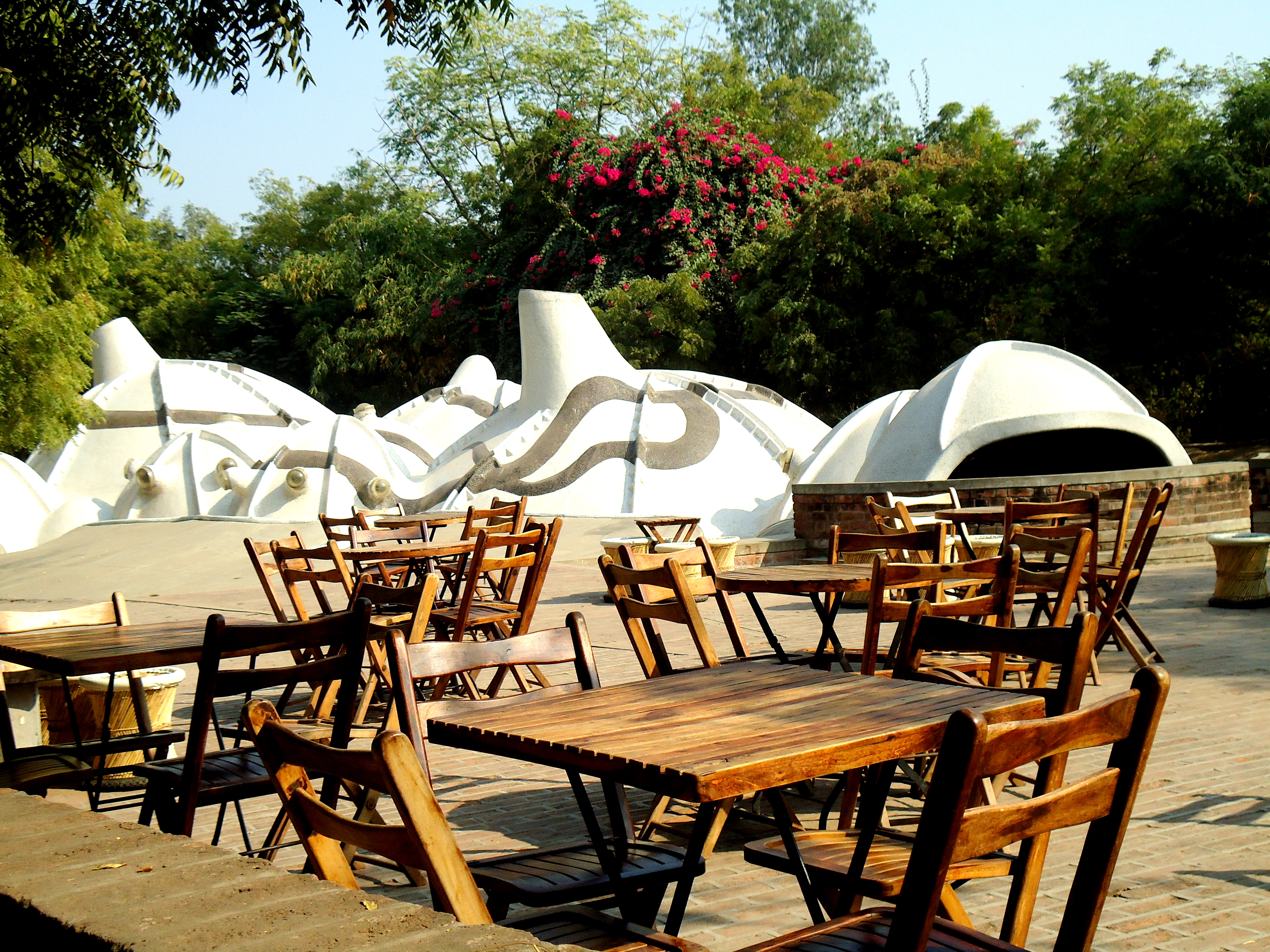
Zen cafe

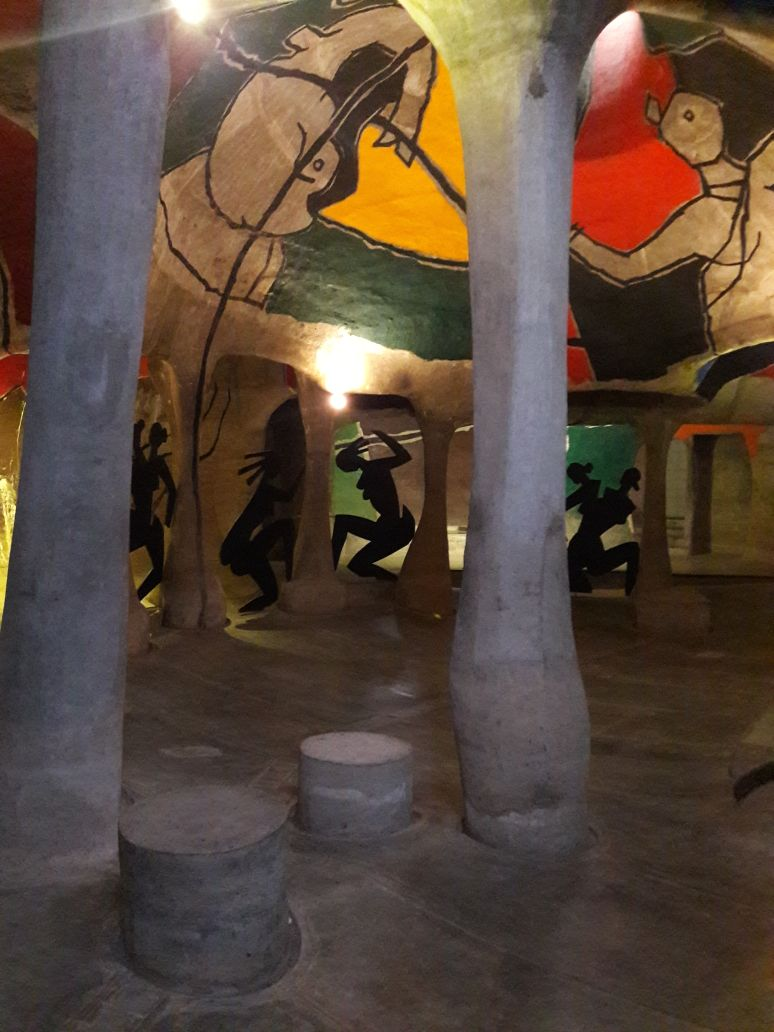
Inside of Hussain Doshi Gufa

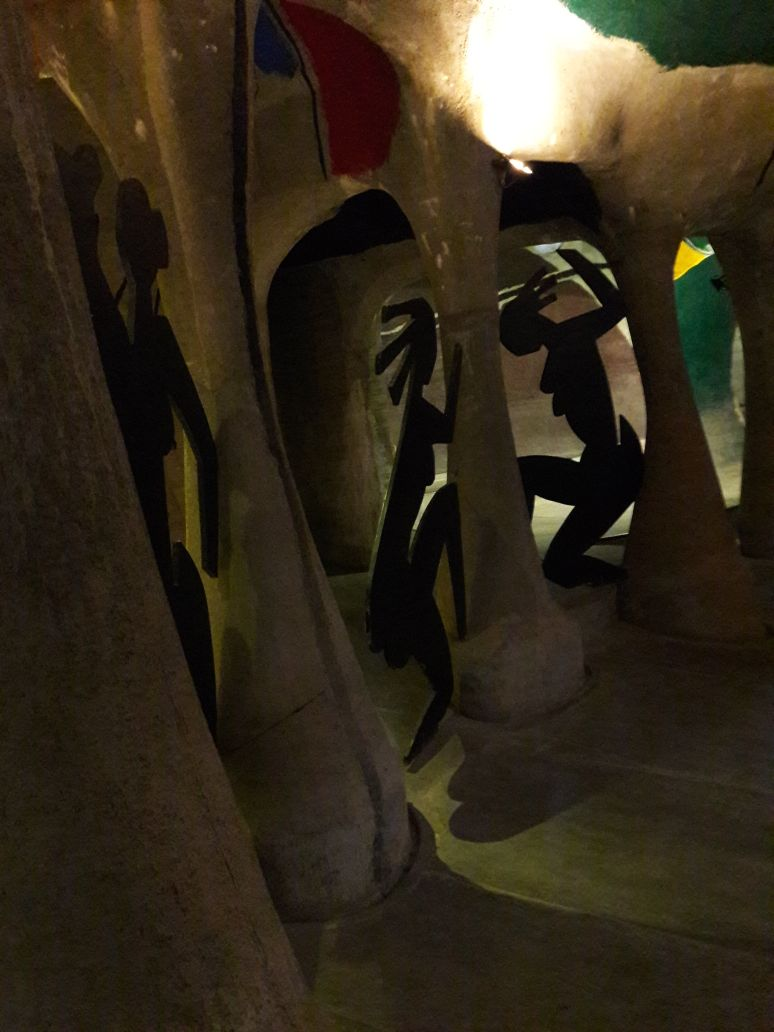
Inside of Hussain Doshi Gufa

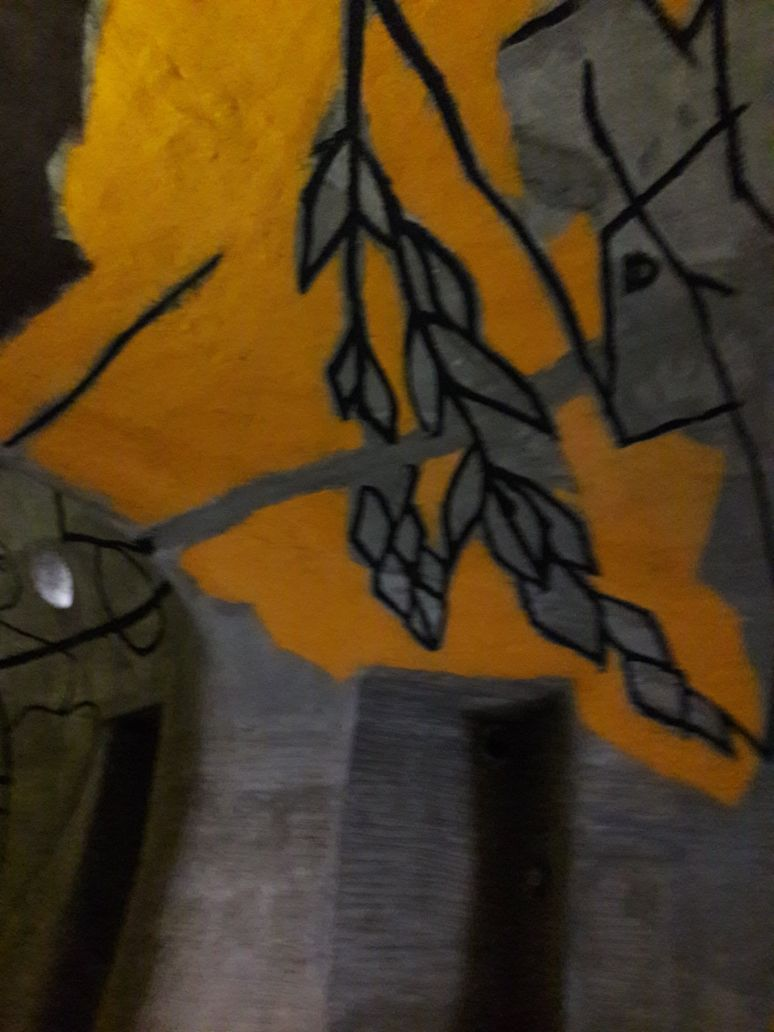
Inside of Hussain Doshi Gufa

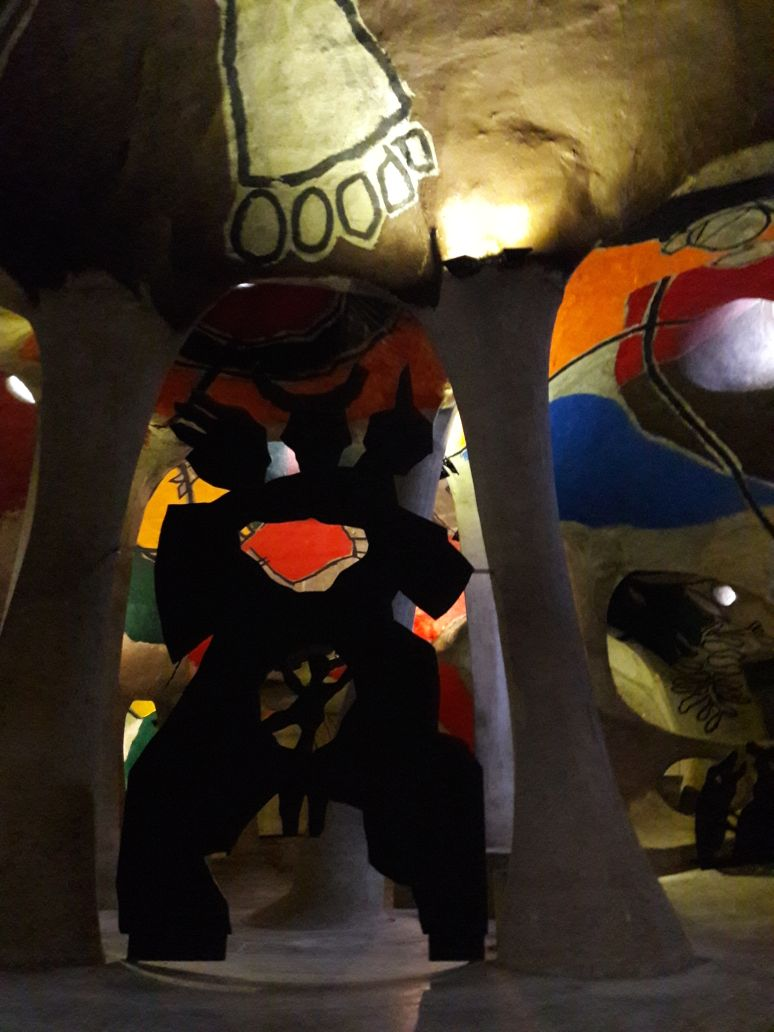
Inside of Hussain Doshi Gufa

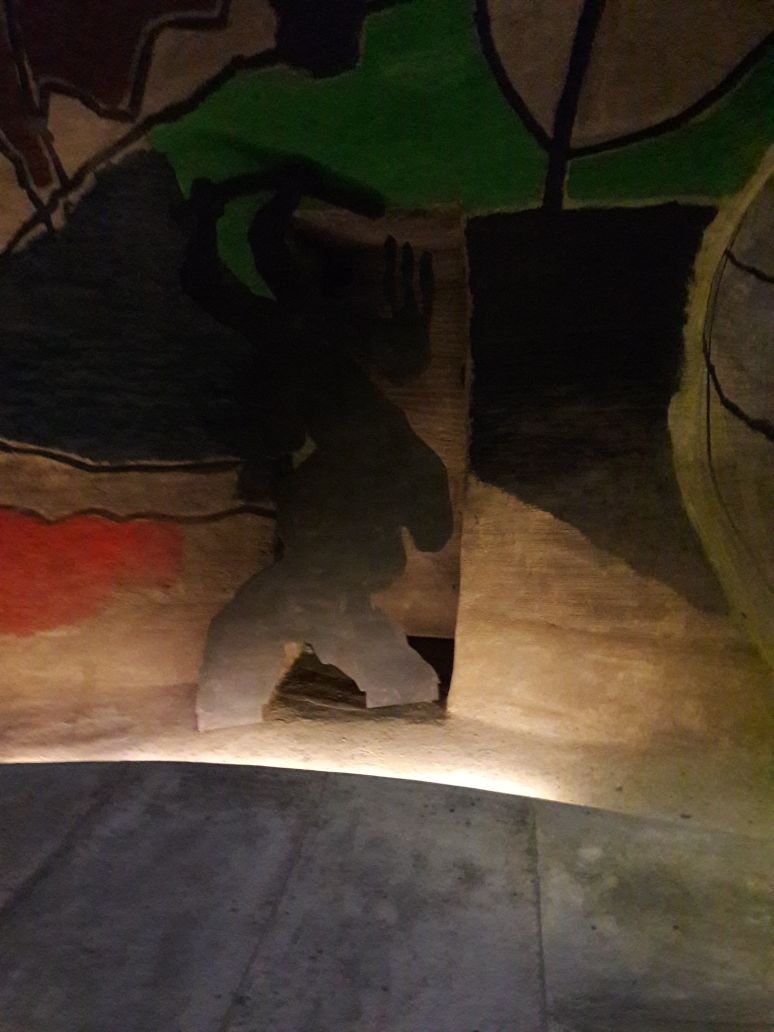
Inside of Hussain Doshi Gufa
