= Ratilal Chandaria =

- Born: October 24, 1922; Nairobi
- Died: October 13, 2013 (aged 90); Mumbai, India
- Occupation: Industrialist
- Spouse: Vijayalakshmi

Ratilal Chandaria (1922-2013) was an industrialist and philanthropist of Indian origin who resided in different parts of the world. He worked to modernize the Gujarati language.

== Life ==
He was born on October 24, 1922, to Premchandbhai and Punjibai. He studied in Nairobi and later moved to Mombasa. He came to India with his parents when World War II started. He left to study and joined the family business thereafter. He married Vijayalakshmi in 1943 at Jamnagar, India. He went back to Nairobi in 1946 and expanded his business activities. He travelled extensively in Africa and Europe and turned his family business into an industry. He moved to Dar-es-Salaam in 1960 and later to London in 1965. He lived in Geneva for a while and later moved to Singapore in 1975. He died on October 13, 2013, in Mumbai. It was a day of Dusshera, the same day he was born, according to the Hindu calendar.

== Philanthropy ==
He extensively worked for the development of the Gujarati language, his mother tongue. He spent 18 years developing a Gujarati dictionary. He founded GujaratiLexicon, Digital Bhagwadgomandal and other initiatives to digitise and contemporise Gujarati. GujaratiLexicon is the largest Gujarati language resource portal in the world, while Bhagwadgomandal is a landmark encyclopedia and lexicon of Gujarati digitised by GujaratiLexicon which is archived in the US Library of Congress and British Library Catalogue.

He cofounded the Institute of Jainology, a UK-based institute specialising in the study of Jainism in 1985 with Nirmal Sethia. He served as chairman until 2012. He served in many social, cultural and religious institutions like Bharatiya Vidya Bhavan, Indian Gymkhana, and the International Forum of Overseas Indians.
