= Cowasjee Jehangir (disambiguation) =

Sir Cowasji Jehangir or (Cowasjee Jehangir) (1879–1962) was the 2nd Baronet of the Jehangir Baronets from India.

Cowasjee Jehangir may also refer to:

- Sir Cowasjee Jehangir, 1st Baronet or Jehangir Cowasji Jehangir Readymoney (1853-1934)
- Sir Cowasjee Jehanghir, 4th Baronet (born 1953) of the Jehangir Baronets
- Sir Cowasjee Jehangir, 5th Baronet (born 1990) of the Jehangir Baronets
- Cowasji Jehangir Readymoney (1812–1878), Indian businessman and philanthropist from Bombay, uncle of the 1st Baronet

== See also ==
- Kawas (disambiguation)
- Jahangir (disambiguation)
- Institutions named after Cowasji Jehangir Readymoney
  - Cowasji Jehangir Hall, Mumbai, India
  - Cowasji Jehangir Convocation Hall, University of Mumbai, India
