= Cowasji =

Cowasji is a given name. Notable people with the name include:

- Cowasji Jehangir (1879–1962), Indian baronet
- Cowasji Jehangir Readymoney (1812–1878), Indian community leader
- Framji Cowasji Banaji (1767–1851), Indian merchant
- Dhunbai Cowasji Jehangir (1860–1940), Indian philanthropist
- Jehangir Cowasji Jehangir Readymoney (1853–1934), Indian baronet
