= Readymoney =

Readymoney or Ready Money may refer to:

- Readymoney Cove - a beach and settlement near Fowey, Cornwall, UK
- Ready Money (film), a 1914 film
- Ready Money Creek, a stream in Alaska

== People with the surname Readymoney ==
- Cowasji Jehangir Readymoney - a community leader, philanthropist and industrialist of Bombay, India
- Jehangir Cowasji Jehangir Readymoney - the son of Cowasji Jehangir Readymoney
