= Kaykaus =

Kaykaus, Keykavus, Kai Kaus, Keikavoos, or Keykavos (Persian: کیکاوس or كيكاووس), may refer to:

== People ==
- Kay Kāvus, legendary king
- Keikavus (Ziyarid), ruled from c. 1050 to 1087, wrote the Qabus-nama
- Kai Ka'us I (Paduspanid ruler), ruled from 1168 to 1184
- Kaykaus I (died 1220)
- Kaykaus II (died 1279/1280)
- Keykavus (Shirvanshah), ruled from 1294 to 1317
- Rukunuddin Kaikaus, Sultan of Bengal
- Ahmad Kaikaus (born 1961), Bangladeshi civil servant

== Places ==
- Keykavus, Chaharmahal and Bakhtiari, Iran
- Keykavus, Khuzestan, Iran
- Keykavus-e Aghajari, Khuzestan Province, Iran

== See also ==
- Kawas (disambiguation)
