= Institute of Psychiatry (disambiguation) =

Institute of Psychiatry may refer to:

- Institute of Psychiatry, Psychology and Neuroscience, previously known as the Institute of Psychiatry, at King's College London, UK
- Centre for Addiction and Mental Health (College Street site), formerly the Clarke Institute of Psychiatry, in Toronto, Canada
- Institute of Psychiatry and Human Behaviour, Goa Medical College, India
- Max Planck Institute of Psychiatry, Munich, Germany
- Central Institute of Psychiatry, Kanke, India
- Somdet Chaopraya Institute of Psychiatry, Bangkok, Thailand
- Institute of Psychiatry at Ain Shams University Faculty of Medicine, Cairo, Egypt
- Stone Institute of Psychiatry at Northwestern Memorial Hospital, Chicago, U.S.
- Cowasjee Jehangir Institute of Psychiatry, Sindh, Pakistan
- Institute of Psychiatry at the Benazir Bhutto Hospital, Rawalpindi, Pakistan
- Institute of Psychiatry at MUSC Health Medical Center, Medical University of South Carolina
