= Kawas =

Kawas, Kavas or Cowas may refer to:

- Kawas (genus), an extinct seal genus
- Kawas (mythology), an Amis spiritual entity, and related terms
- Kawas, Pakistan, a town and union council, Balochistan province, Pakistan
- Kawas, Alabel, a barangay of Alabel, Sarangani, Philippines
- NTPC Kawas, a power plant in Surat, Gujarat, India

== People with the name ==
- Hiba Kawas (born 1972), Lebanese operatic soprano, composer, and academic
- Jeannette Kawas (1946–1995), murdered environmental activist from Honduras
- Samira Kawas, Lebanese producer and actress
- Kavas Jamas Badshah (1858–1931), Indian Civil Service officer, mayor of Ipswich
- Kavasji Jamshedji Petigara (1977–1941), first Indian Deputy Commissioner of Bombay Police
- Cowasjee Jehangir (disambiguation), alternative spelling of Kawasjee Jehangir
- Kavasji Naegamvala (1857–1938), Indian astrophysicist
- Cowaszee Nanabhoy Davar, Indian businessman in the cotton industry
- Kawas Manekshaw Nanavati, Indian naval officer involved in an infamous murder trial
- Kavasji Palanji Khatau 1857–1916), Indian theatre owner
- Cowasji Dinshaw Adenwalla (1827–1900), Indian businessman

== See also ==
- Kavass, often spelled kawas or kawass: a type of Late Ottoman guard
- Kaykaus (disambiguation)
- Cawas (disambiguation)
