= Dhunbai Cowasji Jehangir =

Indian philanthropist

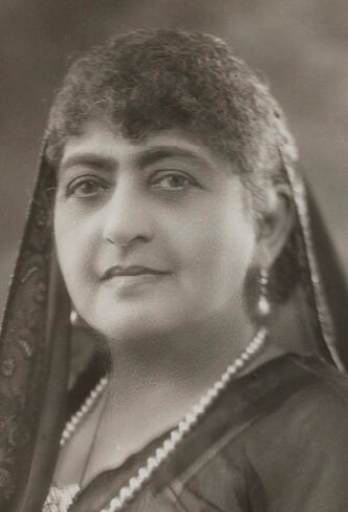
- Dhunbai Cowasji Jehangir, from a portrait by Bassano Ltd, published with her front-page obituary in The Bombay Chronicle in 1940
- Born: Dhunbai Ardeshir Wadia; 1860; Bombay
- Died: 15 July 1940 (aged 79–80)
- Occupation: Philanthropist
- Spouse: Jehangir Cowasji Jehangir Readymoney
- Children: Sir Cowasji Jehangir, 2nd Baronet
- Relatives: Jehangir Sabavala (grandson), Wadia family

Dhunbai Cowasji Jehangir (1860 – 15 July 1940) was an Indian philanthropist and leader of women's organizations, based in Bombay.

== Early life ==
Dhunbai Wadia was born in Bombay, the daughter of Ardeshir Hormusjee Wadia, a member of the Wadia family. Her family were Parsis. She was presented to Queen Victoria in 1885, on her first visit to England.

== Career ==
Jehangir was a co-founder and secretary of the Princess Mary Victoria Gymkhana, a women's social and educational club in Bombay. In 1907, she presided over the All-India Women's Conference at Ahmedabad. She was vice-president of the Bombay chapter of the Indian Women's Council for many years. As a leader of the Bombay branch of the National Baby and Health Week Association in the 1920s, she founded Bombay Baby Week, a week of lectures, demonstrations, and films on child health topics. She represented India in 1924, at the Wembley Empire Exhibition in London. In 1927, she was one of the first women Justices of the Peace in Bombay. She received the gold Kaisar-i-Hind Medal. In 1935 she was president of the Women's Branch of the Indian National Association. She raised funds for women's health, famine relief, and other causes. "There was hardly a movement intended to secure the educational and social progress of women with which the late Dowager Lady Cowasji Jehangir was not actively associated," noted one tribute in 1940.

The Lady Dhunbai Jehangir Home for the Destitute opened in 1938. It was the largest private institution of its kind in Bombay in the 1950s and 1960s.

== Personal life and legacy ==
In 1876, Dhunbai Wadia married banker and industrialist Jehangir Cowasji Jehangir Readymoney. They had three children, all born before 1880, including two daughters, Cooverbai (who died as a young woman) and Bapsey Sabavala, and their son Sir Cowasji Jehangir, 2nd Baronet. Her husband died in 1934, and she died in 1940, aged 79 years. Her Zoroastrian funeral was attended by thousands of mourners.

The Sorabji Ratanji Patel Agiary in Pune includes a hall named for Lady Dhunbai Cowasjee Jehangir. A portrait of Lady Jehangir is prominent at the entrance of the Cowasji Jehangir Hall in Mumbai.

One of Jehangir's grandchildren was the artist Jehangir Sabavala.
