= Cawas =

Cawas is an Indian (Parsi) male given name and surname based on Kay Kāvus, the legendary king of Iran, and may refer to:

- John Cawas, Indian stuntman and actor
- Cawas Billimoria, Indian judoka

== See also ==
- Kawas (disambiguation)
