= National Gallery of Modern Art, Bengaluru =

Art gallery in Bangalore, Karnataka, India

National Gallery of Modern Art (Bangalore)
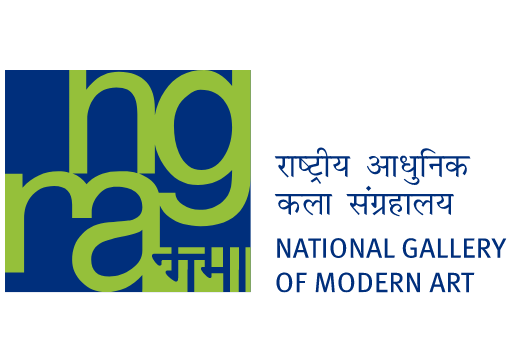

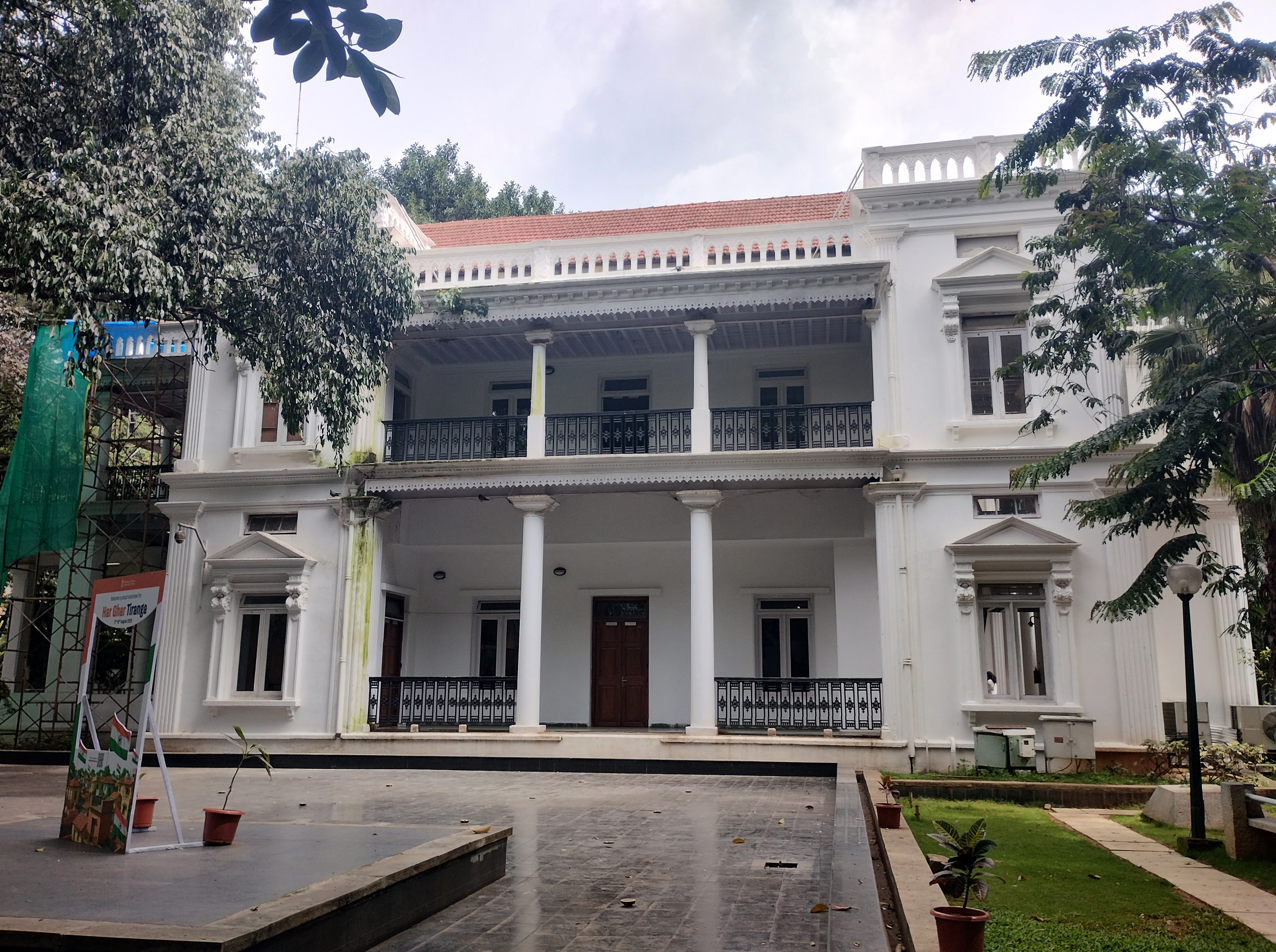
- NGMA in 2025
- Established: 18 February 2009
- Location: Bangalore Urban
- Coordinates: 12.989705°N 77.588150°E
- Type: Art gallery
- Collections: Painting of renowned Indian artists.
- Collection size: 500
- Owner: Government of India
- Parking: On site (no charge)
- Website: https://ngmaindia.gov.in/ngma_bangaluru.asp

National Gallery of Modern Art (NGMA) is an art gallery in Bangalore. It was inaugurated in the year 2009. It showcases modern Indian art and houses paintings by Raja Ravi Verma, Jamini Roy, Amrita Sher-Gil, Rabindranath Tagore and a large number of modern and contemporary artists. Equipped with an auditorium, a public art reference library, a cafeteria, and a museum shop cum facilitation block, the NGMA Bengaluru looks ahead to becoming a hub of art activities and a major cultural centre at Bengaluru. The gallery organizes and hosts talks on art and culture by speakers, seminars, film screenings as well as workshops and guided walks throughout the year.

== History ==
The gallery was being refurbished in 2006 to open as the third site of NGMA. This follows a prolonged period of development and controversy. The sprawling, 100 year old Manikyavelu Mansion once belonged to Kanteerava Narasimharaja Wadiyar the, a Yuvaraja of Mysore. This building was built by the well-known merchant Haji Sir Ismail Sait, who named his sprawling bungalow ‘Ismailia’.

It was later sold to Manickavelu Mudaliar. Mudaliar was not born into aristocracy, but rather married into it. He became a successful business owner after leasing several manganese and chrome mines on lease. According to the documents in the NGMA archives, the building was bought by Mudalier early on in his career. The archivists at the NGMA are certain that Mudalier and his family lived in the mansion for quite some years. However, due to financial problems, the house was put on auction and was acquired by the City Improvement Trust, currently the BDA, and then transferred to the Housing Board in the 1960s. In 2000, the Ministry of Kannada and culture sub-leased the mansion to the Ministry of Culture. It became the chosen location for the southern centre the NGMA. Restoration began in 2003, and opened on 18 February 2009 under the curatorial ship of Sobha Nambisan.

== Building ==
In Bangalore, it is functional in Manikyavelu mansion on Palace road in the city of Bengaluru.

== Collection ==
NGMA Bangalore currently houses approximately 500 exhibits that are spread across a corridor, tiny rooms and large spacious halls that span two floors. You could cover this in between 1 and 2 hours. The exhibits have been displayed - classified into broad categories - according to different time periods, art schools and by artists. One can see paintings by Raja Ravi Verma, Jamini Roy, Amrita Sher-Gil, the Tagore brothers and Rabindranath Tagore and a large number of Modern and Contemporary artists. The NGMA has modern, post-modern and traditional Indian art work. It hosts art work from the 18th Century to present day. Sculptures by the likes of S. Dhanpal and Kanayi Kunhiraman as well as artworks by Arpita Singh and Anjolie Ela Menon are a part of the extensive collection. The display includes Indian miniatures, colonial artists, Bengal School and post-independence artists which led to the birth of modern and post-modern art of today. In addition to permanent display of the paintings and sculptures, this NGMA also showcases national and international exhibitions regularly.

== Gallery ==
=== NGMA in 2025 ===
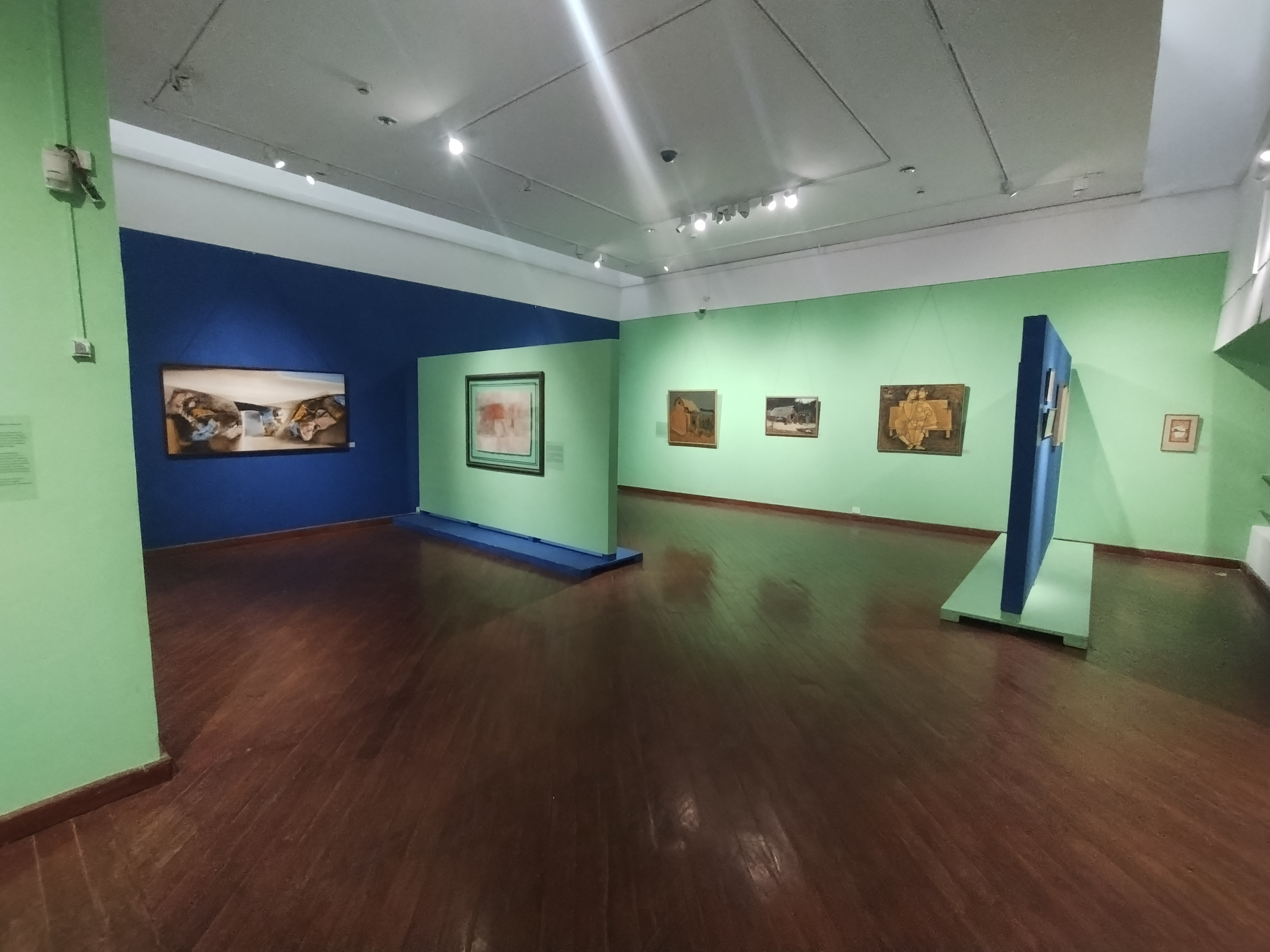

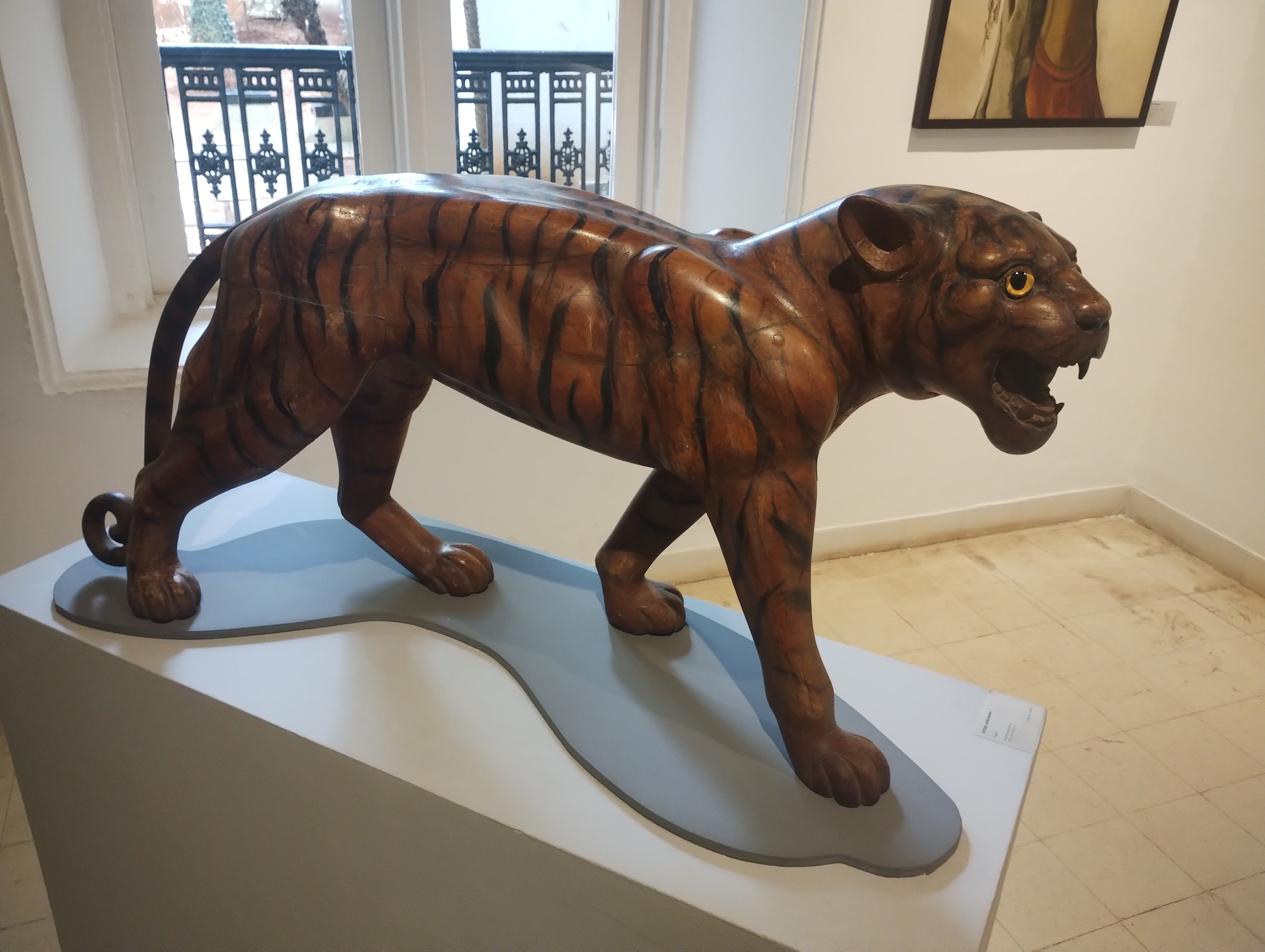

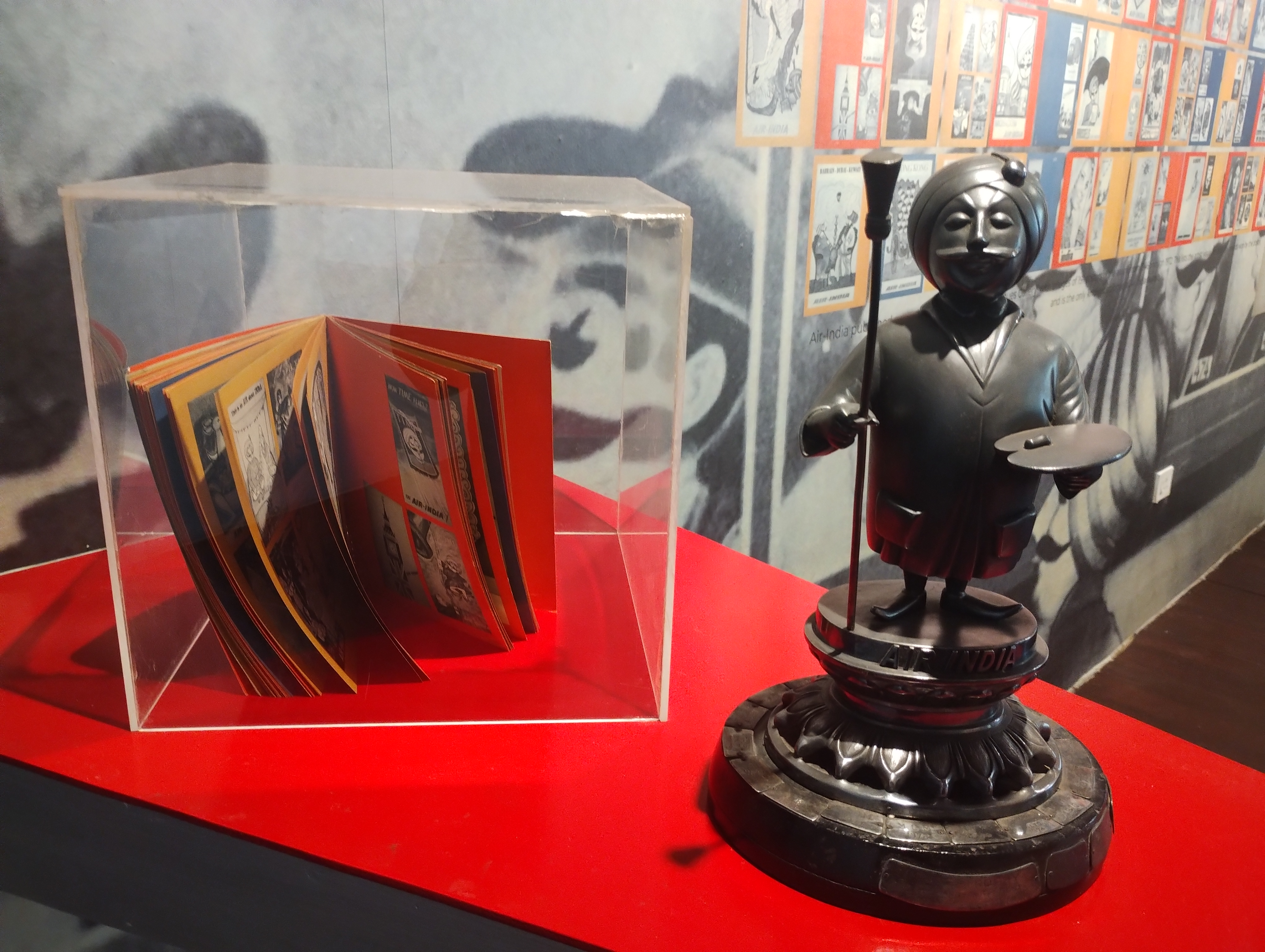

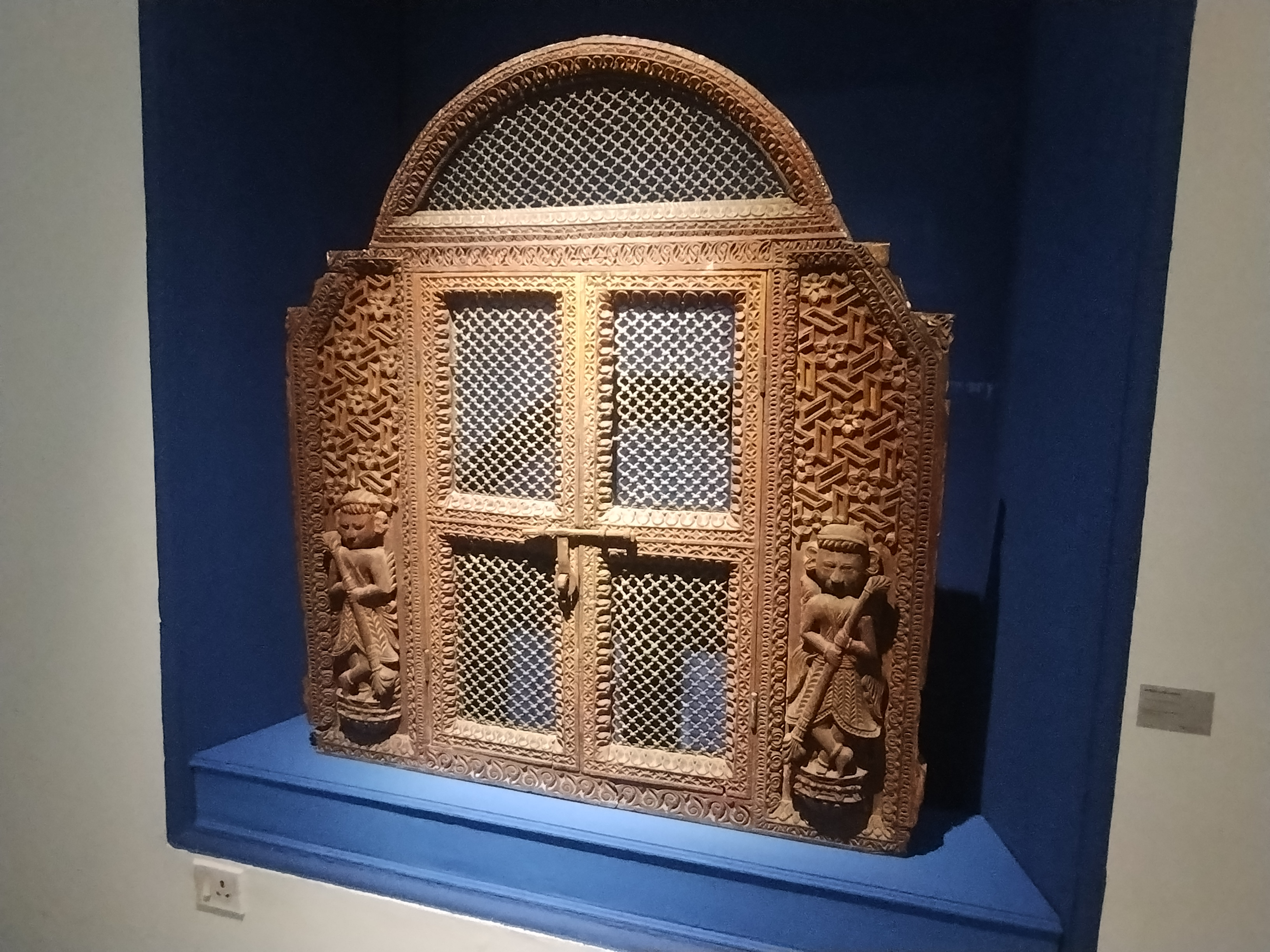

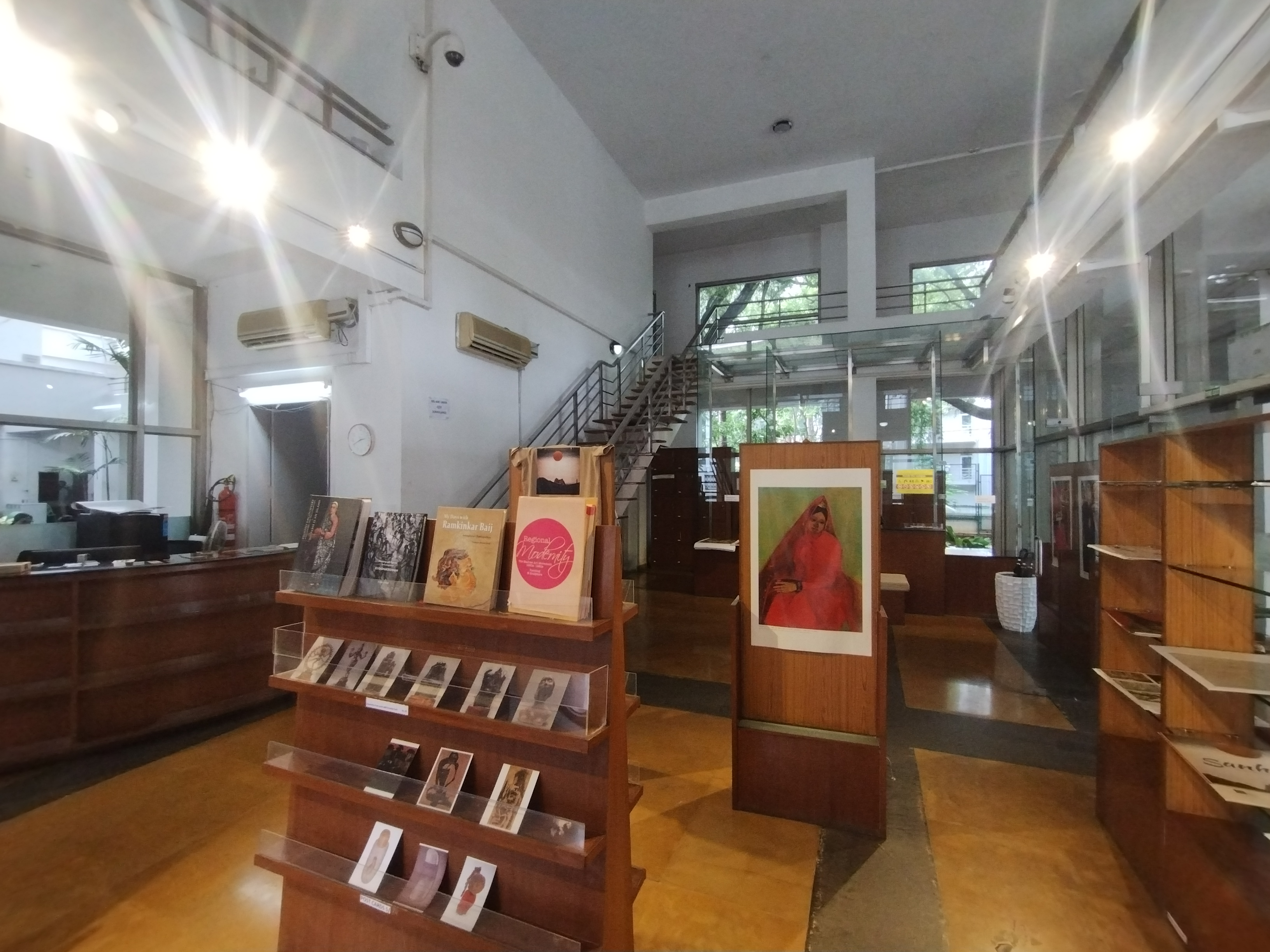

== See also ==
- Kolkata Museum of Modern Art
- National Gallery of Modern Art, Mumbai
- National Gallery of Modern Art, New Delhi
