= Jehangir Hospital =

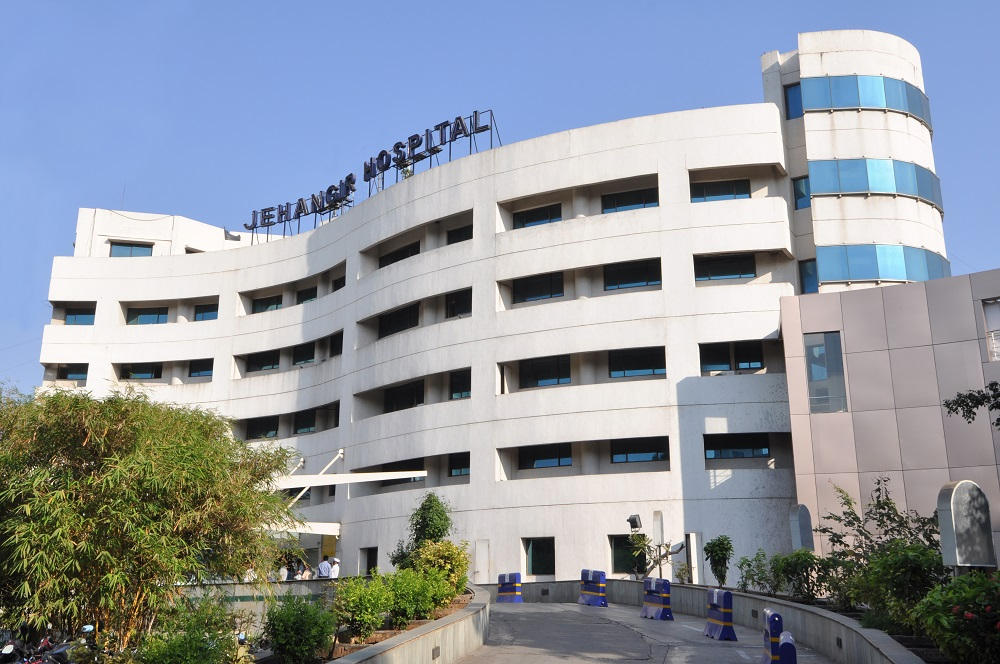
- Jehangir Hospital main building in Pune

- Shown in Pune, Maharashtra

Geography
- Location: 32, Sassoon Road, Pune, Maharashtra, India
- Coordinates: 18°31′49″N 073°52′36″E

Services
- Standards: NABH and NABL
- Emergency department: Available with Ambulance Services
- Beds: 350

History
- Founded: 1946

Links
- Website: www.jehangirhospital.com
- Lists: Hospitals in India

Jehangir Hospital is a 350-bed hospital in Pune, Maharashtra, India. Sir Cowasji Jehangir and Lady Hirabai Jehangir founded the hospital on 6 February 1946.

== History ==
The Jehangir Nursing Home was set by Sir Cowasji and Lady Hirabai who donated the land to start the hospital. The villa was called Ready Money Villa but they named it after their son Jehangir, who died that year. The hospital began with 8 beds and Eduljee H Coyaji was asked to helm Pune city's first private hospital in May 1946.

== Facilities ==
Jehangir Hospital has 350 beds. It has been certified by NABH in 2013 and NABL. It works closely with the Hirabai Cowasji Jehangir Medical Research Institute and the National Aids Research Institute. It handles around 1,00,000 patients annually including international patients who come from countries that include the Middle East and Africa.

== Acquisitions ==
In 2017, Jehangir Hospital acquired the Jog Hospital in Kothrud, a suburb in Pune and have renamed it as Jehangir Specialty Hospital.
