= Readymoney Drinking Fountain =

Drinking fountain in Regent's Park, London

Coordinates: 51°31′58″N 0°09′02″W

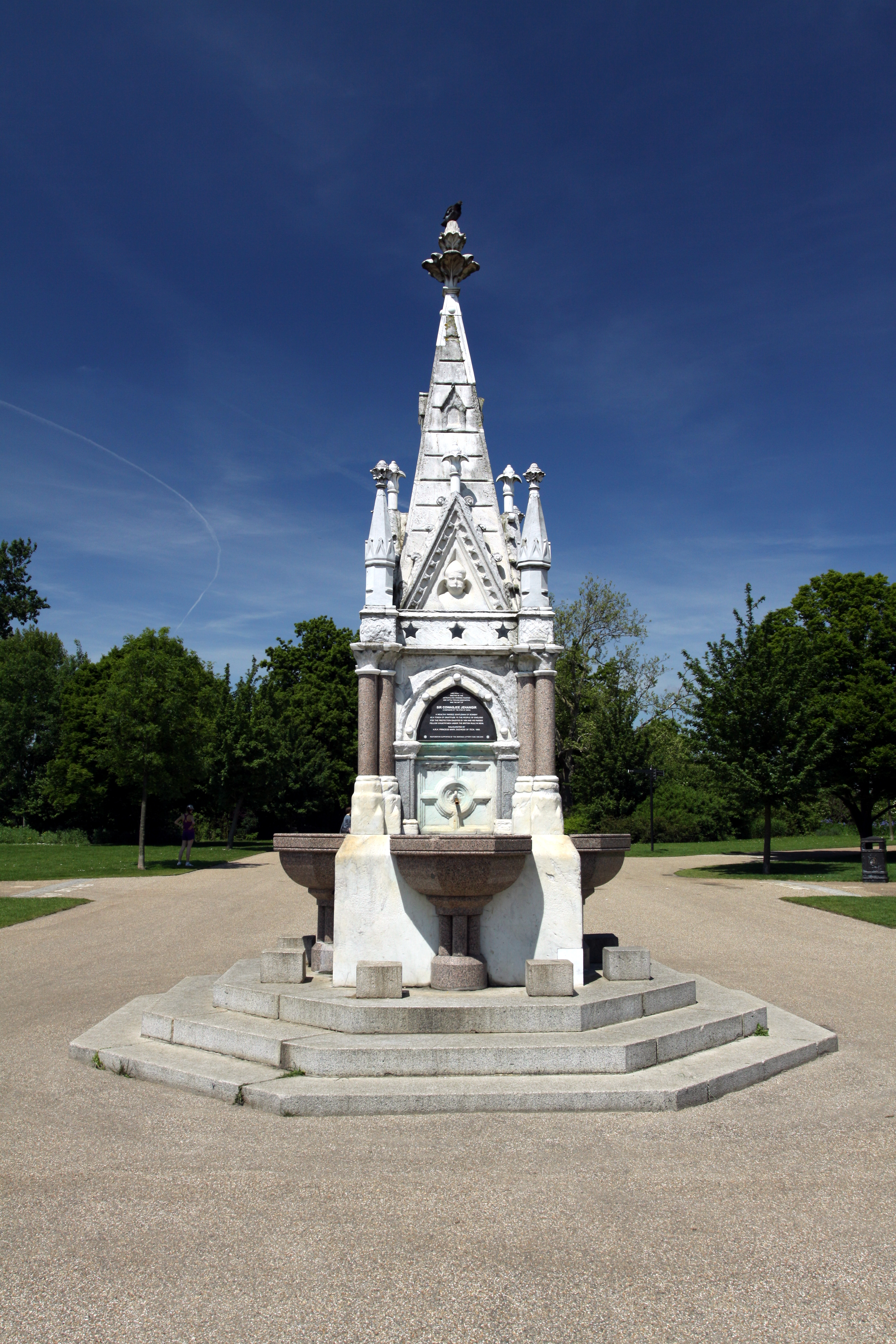
Readymoney Drinking Fountain in 2013

The Readymoney Drinking Fountain, also occasionally known as the Parsee Fountain, is a Grade II listed structure near the middle of the Broad Walk footpath on the east side of Regent's Park, in London. It lies southeast of London Zoo, close to the highest point of Regent's Park, about 41 metres (135 ft) above sea level, in an area with few trees, making it widely visible across the park.

The drinking fountain was erected in 1869, with the £1,400 cost funded by Sir Cowasji Jehangir Readymoney, a successful Parsee businessman and philanthropist from Bombay, as a token of thanks to the people of England for their protection of the Parsees in British India.

The structure was built to the Gothic design of Robert Keirle, who was the architect of the Metropolitan Drinking Fountain and Cattle Trough Association. It was constructed by the sculptor Henry Ross, using 10 tons of white marble from Sicily, and 4 tons of pink and grey granite from Aberdeen.

The main four-sided structure rests on three octagonal steps. The central white marble block has a pink granite basin on each side, with granite standing blocks on the ground beside each basin. Small apertures were included at the base of the central block to allow dogs to drink. Above each basin is a carved marble panel, with one depicting a lion and another a Brahmin bull, topped by a frieze decorated with inlaid stars and a triangular pediment resembling a gable. The central block rises to a gabled spire with a decorative terminal, with three pink granite columnettes rising to a single pinnacle at each corner. Three of the gables have a carved bust, depicting Readymoney, Prince Albert, and Queen Victoria, and the fourth has a clock.

The drinking fountain was unveiled on 1 August 1869 by Princess Mary of Teck; she was a granddaughter of George III, and her daughter later became Queen Mary.

It was listed at Grade II in 1970, and was later restored in 1999–2000, with over £400,000 of funding from the Heritage Lottery Fund. A modern plaque above the basin on the south face of the fountain reads:

"This fountain erected by the Metropolitan Drinking Fountain and Cattle Trough Association was the gift of Sir Cowasjee Jehangir (Companion of the Star of India), a wealthy Parsee gentleman of Bombay, as a token of gratitude to the people of England for the protection enjoyed by him and his Parsee fellow countrymen under the British rule in India.
Inaugurated by H.R.H. Princess Mary, Duchess of Teck, 1869.
Restoration supported by the Heritage Lottery Fund 1999 – 2000.

Further restoration work was undertaken in 2016 and 2017. The water no longer runs, but a modern drinking fountain has been installed nearby.

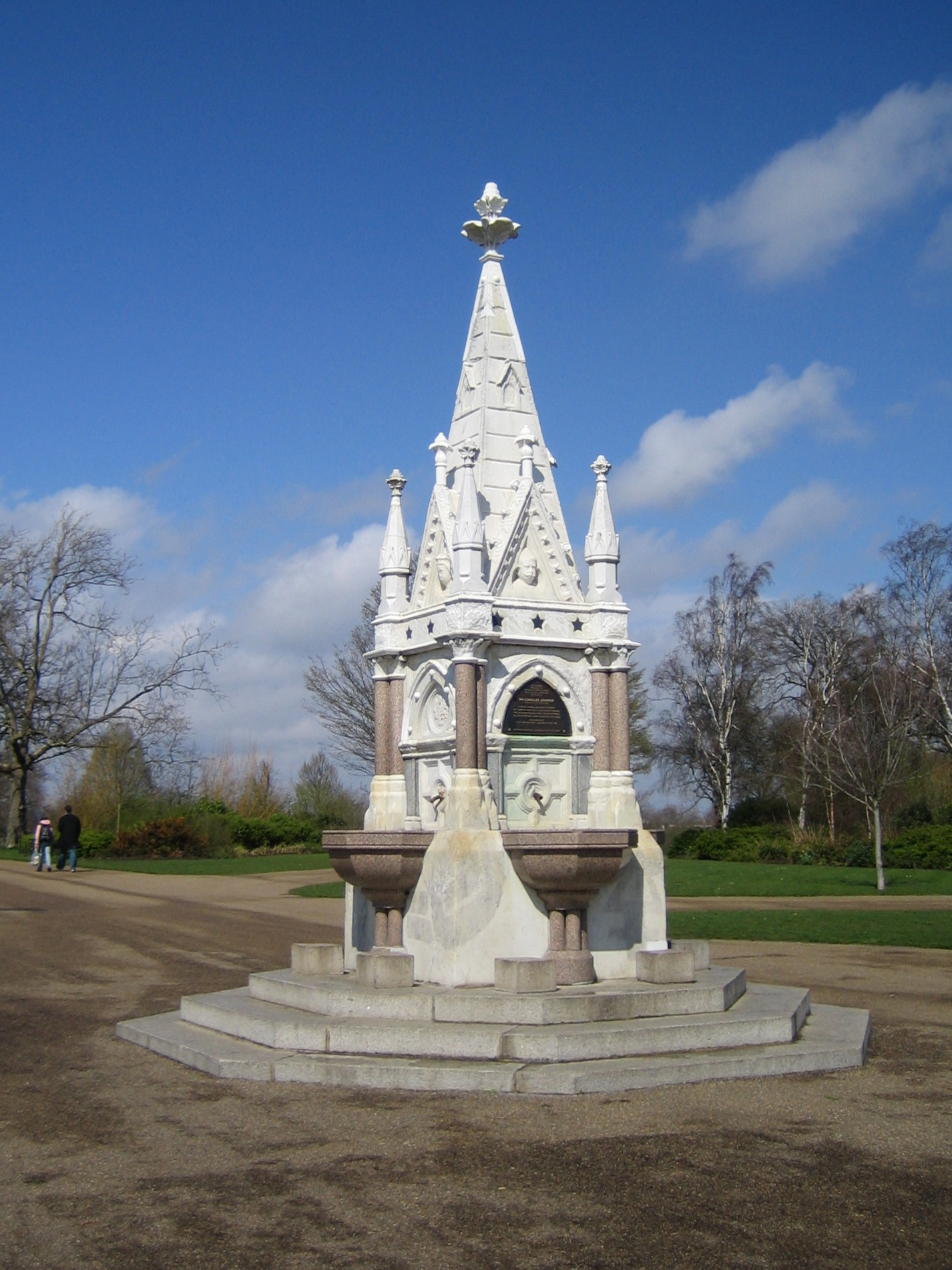
Fountain in 2006

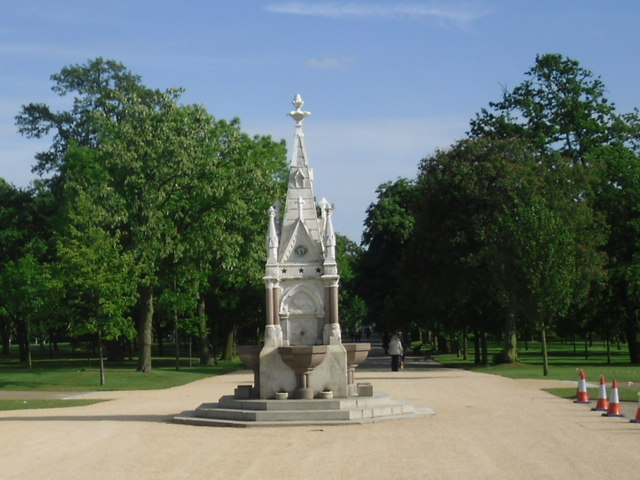
Fountain in 2009

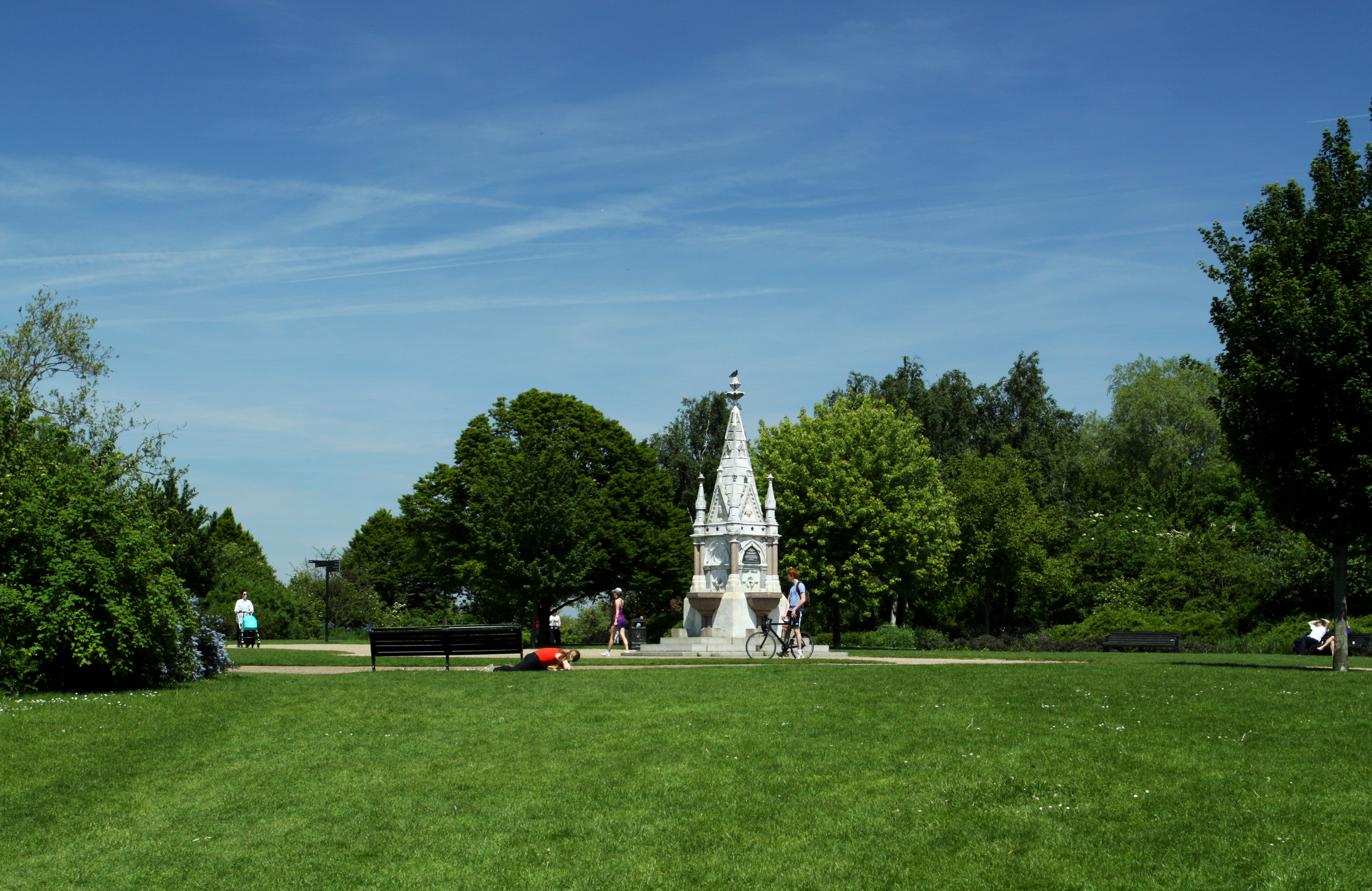
Fountain in 2013
