= Ready Money Creek =

Stream in Yukon–Koyukuk Census Area, Alaska, U.S.

Coordinates: 65°06′35″N 150°54′33″W

Ready Money Creek is a stream in Yukon–Koyukuk Census Area, Alaska, in the United States.

The name was recorded by the United States Geological Survey in 1952.

== See also ==
- List of rivers of Alaska
