= National Gallery of Modern Art, Mumbai =

Art gallery in Mumbai, India

Coordinates: 18.9258°N 72.8313°E

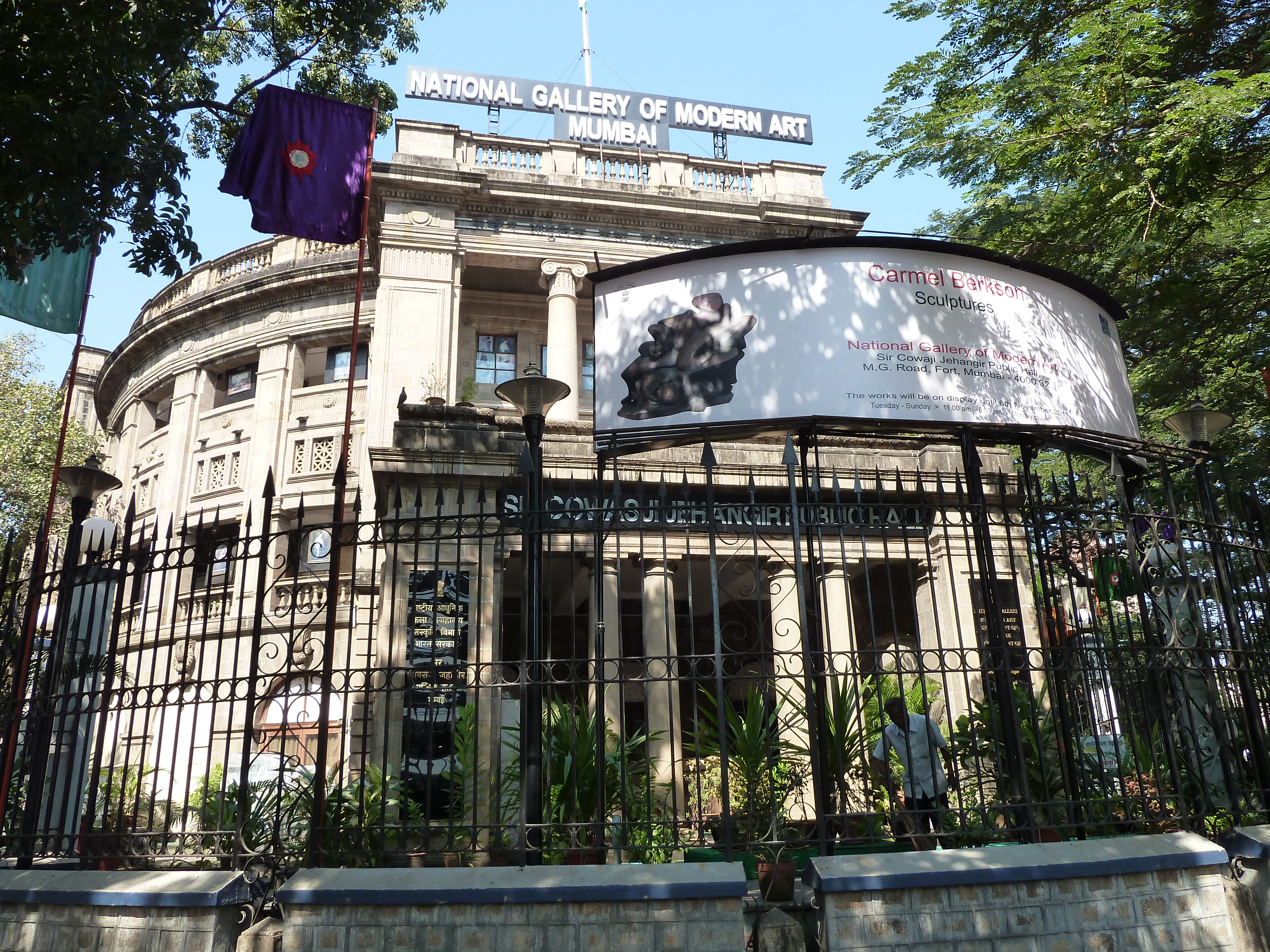
- Entrance to the National Gallery of Modern Art, Mumbai
- Established: 1996
- Location: Mumbai, Maharashtra, India

UNESCO World Heritage Site
- Criteria: Cultural: (ii) (iv)
- Designated: 2018 (43rd session)
- Part of: Victorian Gothic and Art Deco Ensembles of Mumbai
- Reference no.: 1480

National Gallery of Modern Art, Mumbai was opened to the public in 1996. It hosts various exhibitions and art collections of famous artists, sculptors and different civilizations. It is situated in the Cowasji Jehangir Hall, near Regal Cinema in Colaba.

== History ==
The idea of a National art gallery was first mooted in 1949, and further developed by Prime Minister Jawahar Lal Nehru and Maulana Azad, bureaucrats such as Humayun Kabir and the local art community. Vice-president Dr. S.Radhakrishnan formally inaugurated the NGMA in the presence of Prime Minister Jawaharlal Nehru and artists and art lovers of the city on 29 March 1954. The choice of Jaipur House, one of the premier edifices of Lutyens’ Delhi, signified the envisaged high profile of the institution. Designed by Sir Arthur Blomfield, as a residence for the Maharaja of Jaipur, the butterfly-shaped building with a central dome was built in 1936. It was styled after a concept of the Central Hexagon visualised by Sir Edwin Lutyens. It was Lutyens, along with Herbert Baker, who visualized and gave shape to the new capital in Delhi. Along with buildings designed for other princely potentates like Bikaner and Hyderabad, Jaipur House girded the India Gate circle.

NGMA's inauguration was marked by an exhibition of sculptures. Prominent sculptors of the time including Debi Prasad Roy Chowdhury, Ramkinkar Baij, Sankho Chaudhuri, Dhanraj Bhagat, Sarbari Roy Choudhury and others had participated. The show was prepared by NGMA's first curator Herman Goetz. A noted German art historian, Goetz had earlier been responsible for setting up the Baroda Museum.

The Gallery is run and administered as a subordinate office to the Department of Culture, Government of India, and showcases the changing art forms through the passage of the last hundred and fifty years starting from about 1857 in the field of Visual art and Plastic arts.

== Collection ==
- A collection of Pablo Picasso's works
- Egyptian artifacts such as mummies, statues, etc.

== Gallery ==
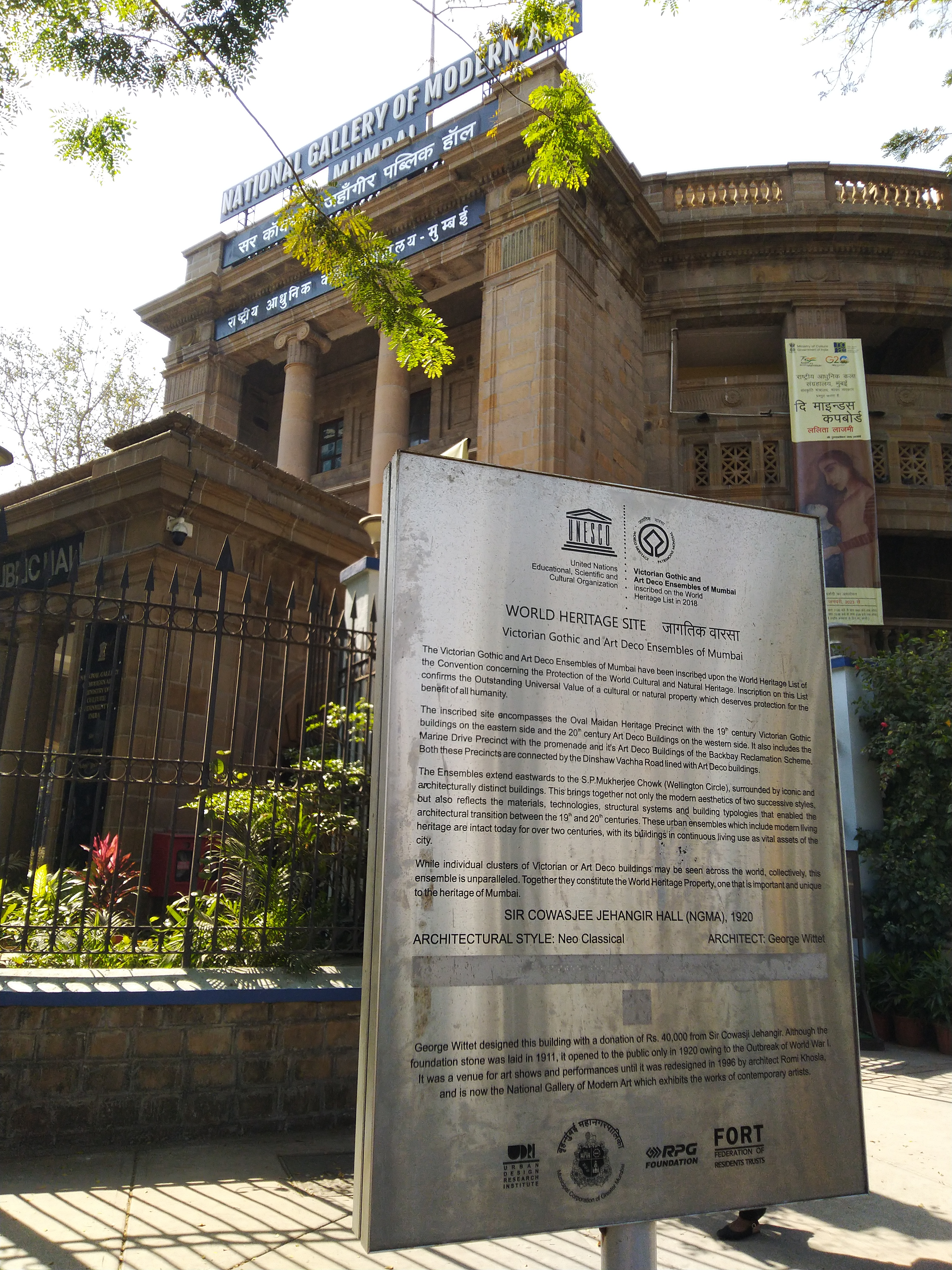
World Heritage Site info about Sir Cowasji Jehangir Public Hall which houses the National Gallery of Modern Art, Mumbai

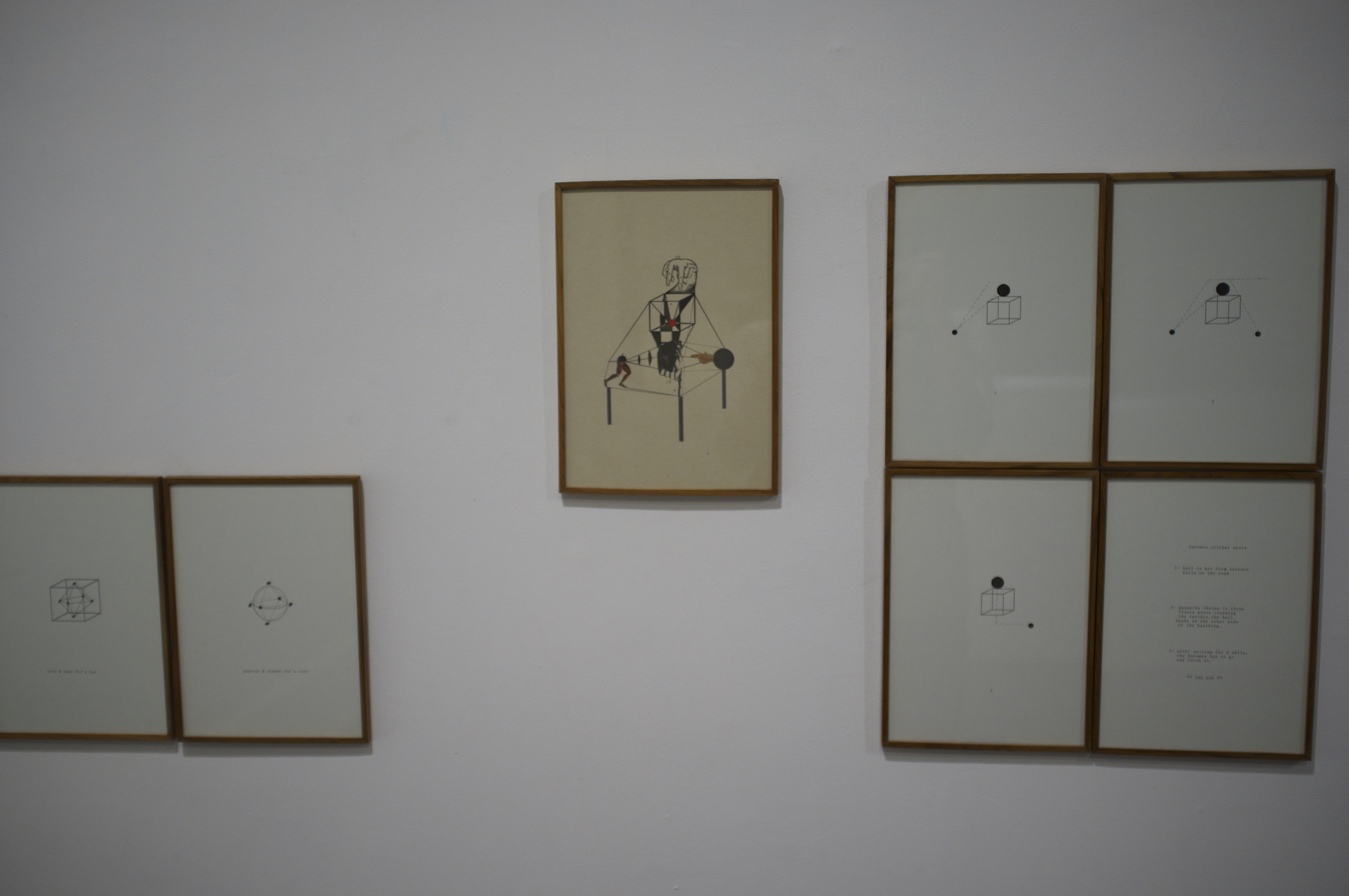
National Gallery of Modern Art, Mumbai, India January 9, 2015

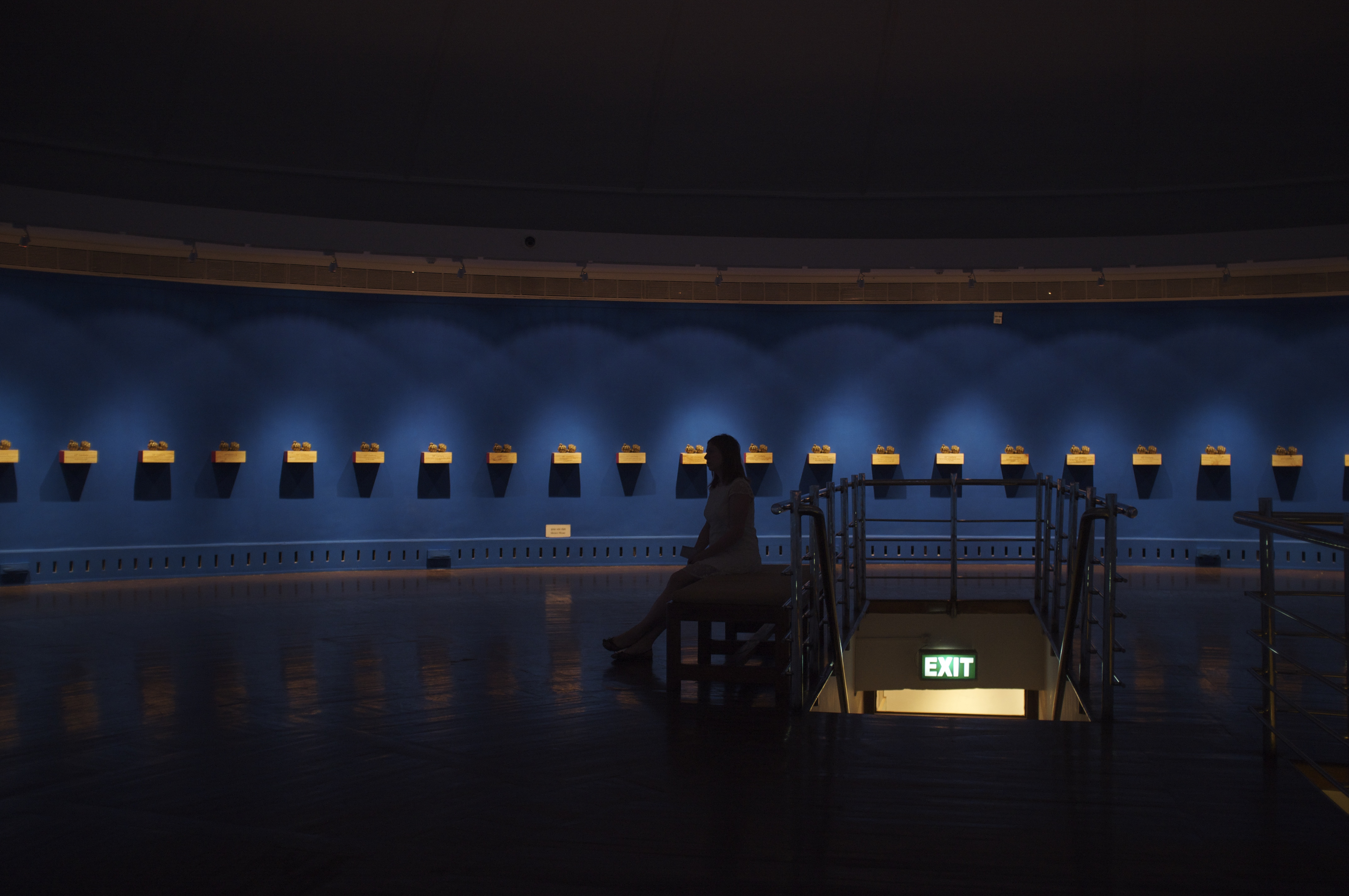
National Gallery of Modern Art, Mumbai, India January 9, 2015

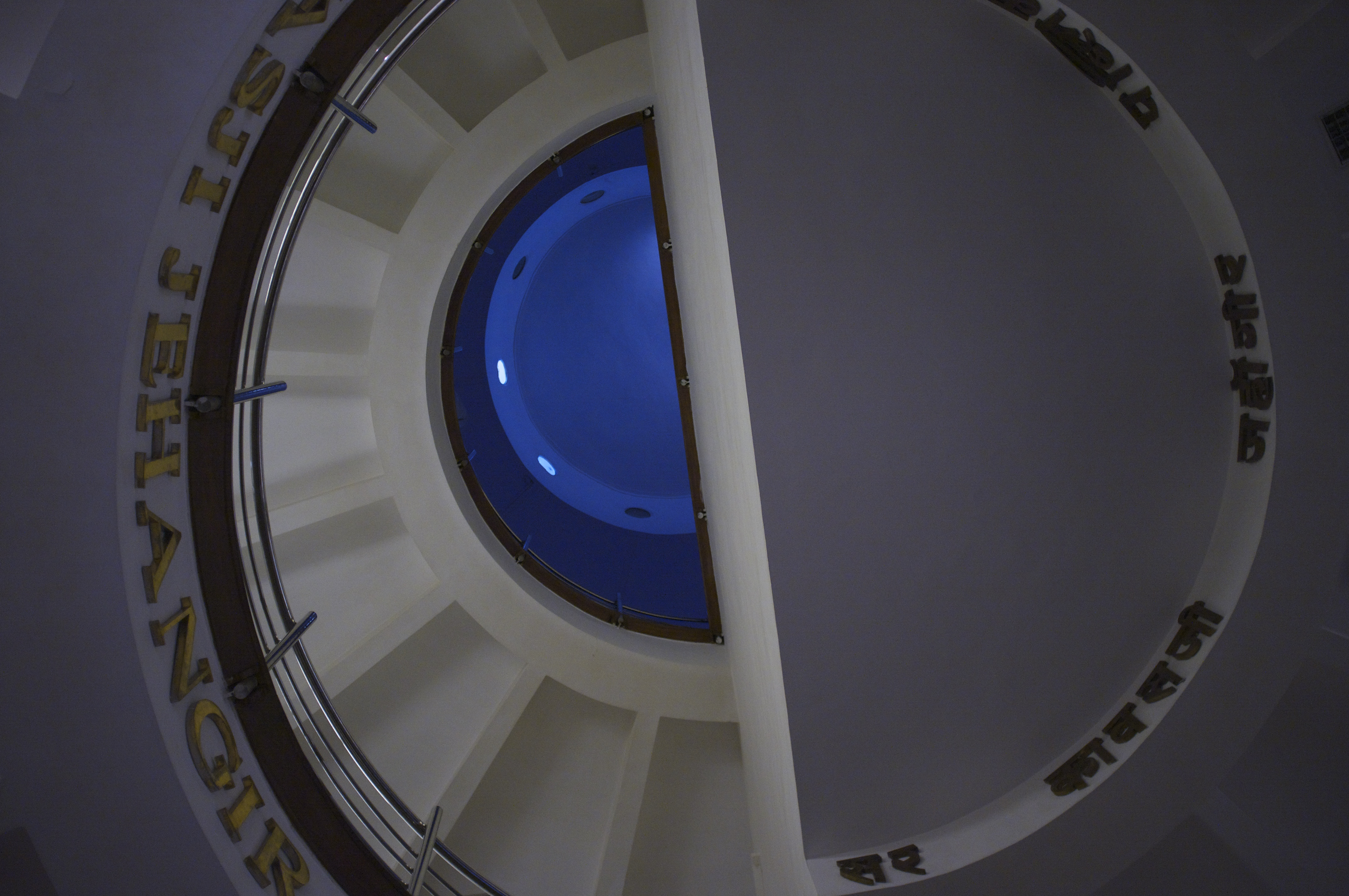
National Gallery of Modern Art, Mumbai, India January 9, 2015

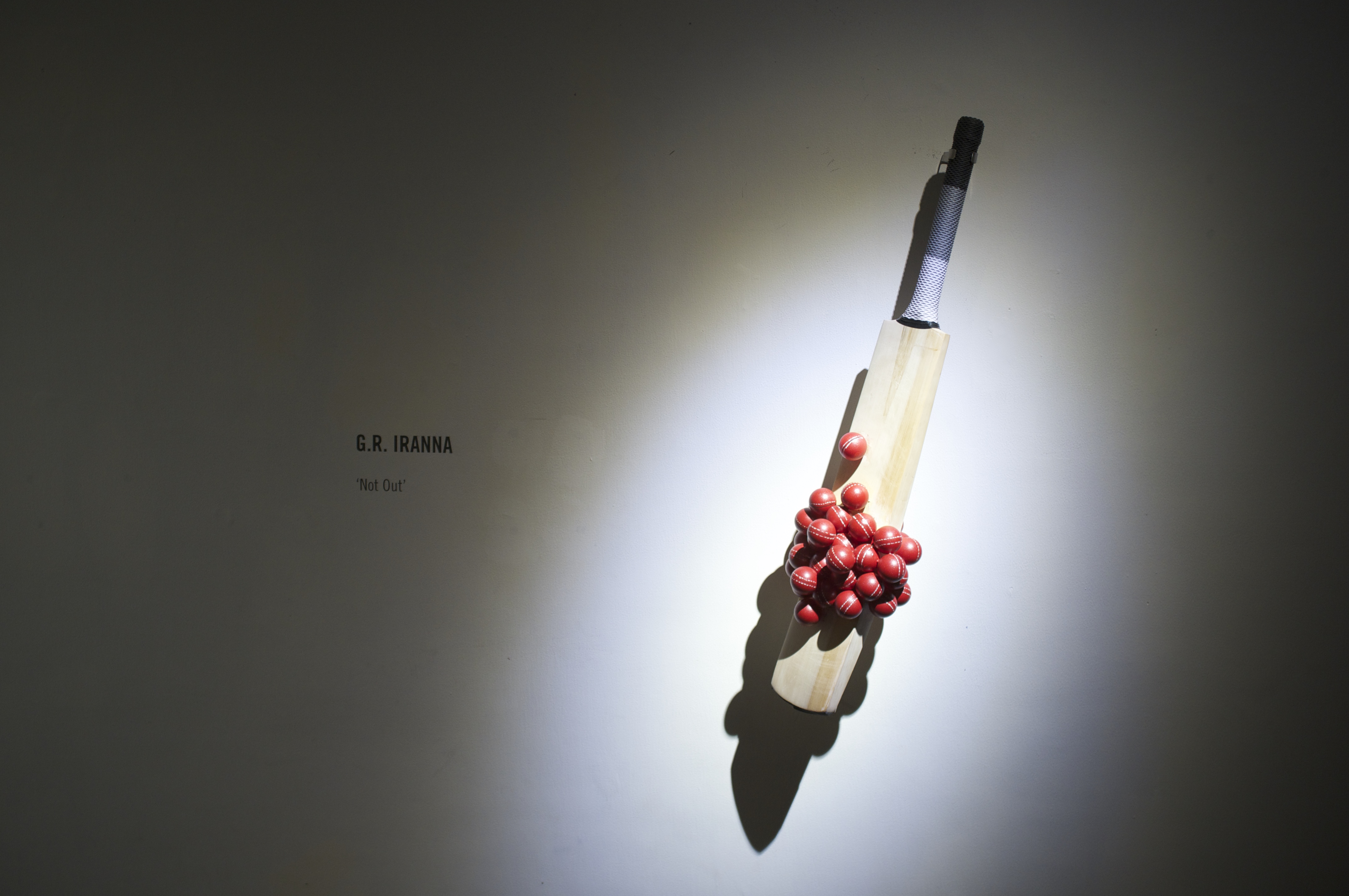
National Gallery of Modern Art, Mumbai, India January 9, 2015

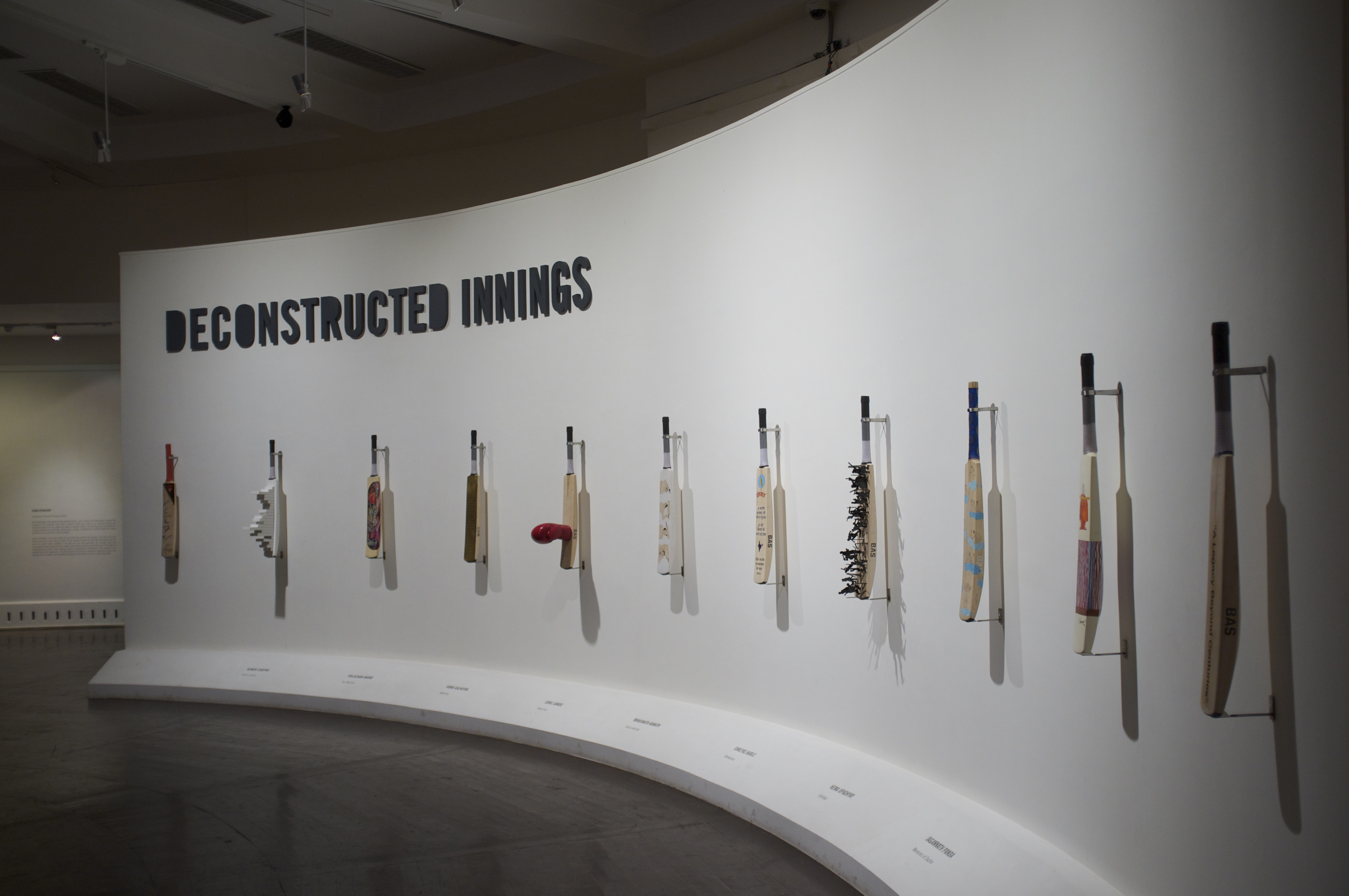
Deconstructed Innings, National Gallery of Modern Art, Mumbai, India January 9, 2015

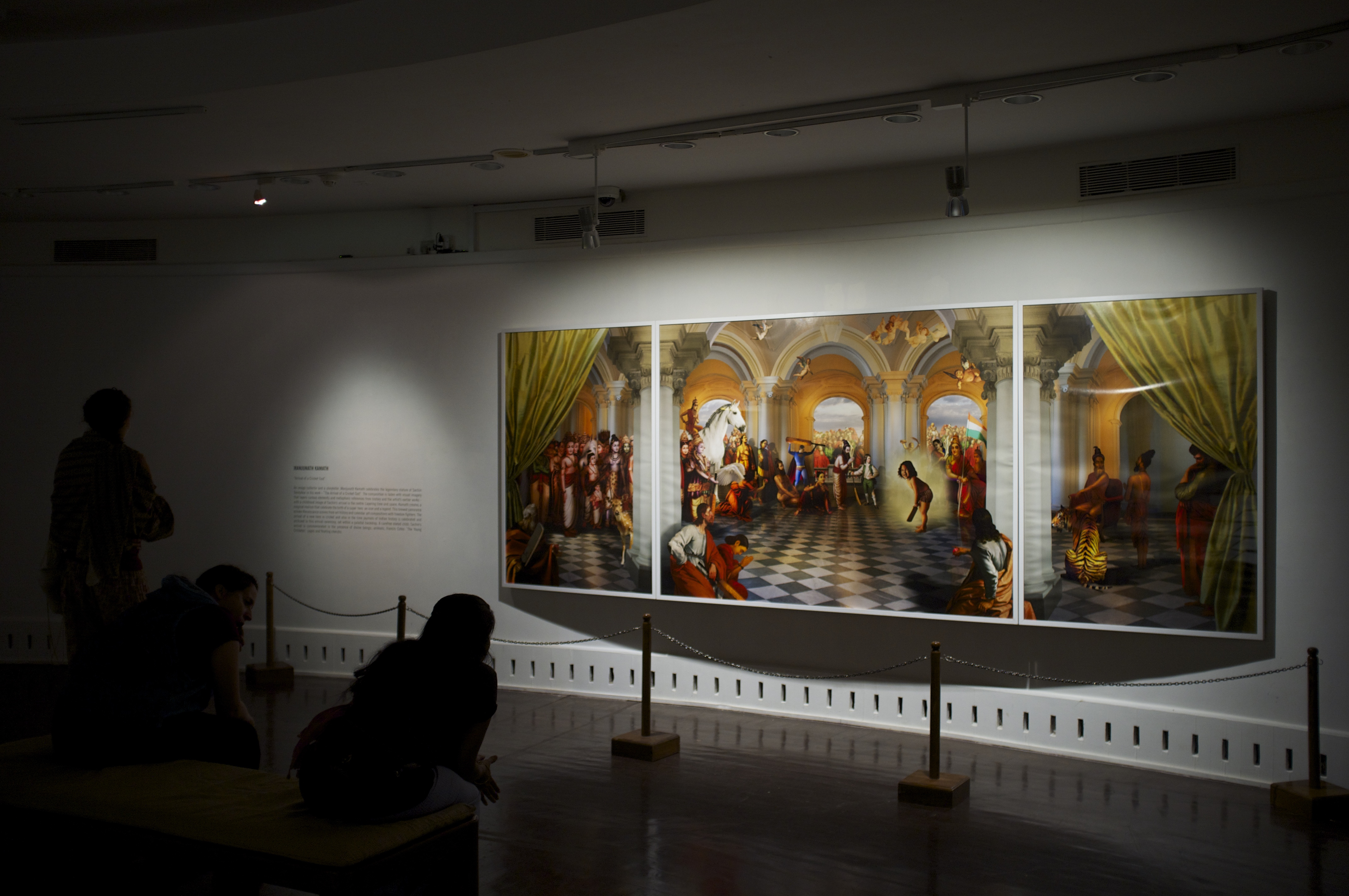
The central figure, a glowing young boy, is Sachin Tendulkar, famed cricketer. Behind him, holding the flag of India is the goddess Saraswati. The American comic book hero, Superman, is seen wielding a cricket bat. Other gods and rishis by Raja Ravi Varma can be seen.

== See also ==
- Kolkata Museum of Modern Art
- National Gallery of Modern Art, Bangalore
- National Gallery of Modern Art, New Delhi
