= Cowasjee Jehangir Institute of Psychiatry =

Geography
- Location: Latifabad suburb of the city of Hyderabad, Sindh, Pakistan
- Coordinates: 25.377219°N 68.332365°E

History
- Former name: Giddu Bandar Mental Hospital
- Opened: 1852

Links
- Lists: Hospitals in Pakistan

Jehangir Institute of Psychiatry is a hospital located in Latifabad suburb of the city of Hyderabad, in Sindh, Pakistan. It was established in 1852 during the British Raj and was named after Jehangir Cowasji Jehangir Readymoney. It is the largest psychiatric hospital in Pakistan. It is locally known as Giddu Bandar Mental Hospital.

== History ==
The Jehangir Institute of Psychiatry was founded by Sir Cowasjee Jehangir (1812-1878) in 1852. He obtained land at Giddu Bandar on which he constructed a hospital for the mentally ill patients of Sindh.

The institute also offers post-graduation study.
