= Jehangir baronets =

Baronetcy in the Baronetage of the United Kingdom

The Jehangir baronetcy, of Bombay, is a title in the Baronetage of the United Kingdom. It was created on 16 July 1908 for Cowasjee Jehanghir, an influential member of the Parsee community in Bombay. He was the nephew and adopted son and heir of the Parsee industrialist Cowasji Jehangir Readymoney.

The Legislative Council of India decided in 1911 that future holders were to assume the name of the 1st Baronet on succeeding.

== Jehangir baronets, of Bombay (1908) ==
- Sir Cowasji Jehangir, 1st Baronet (1853–1934). He was adopted by his childless uncle at a young age. He married Dhunbai, d/o Ardeshir Hormusjee Wadia, of the Wadia family. They had three children, two daughters, Cooverbai Ghaswala and Meherbai Sabavala, and a son, Cowasji, 2nd Baronet.
- Sir Cowasji Jehangir, 2nd Baronet (1879–1962). Born 16 Feb 1879, he married Hilla, daughter of Hormarji Wadia, on 22 February 1911. They had three children, a daughter, Sylla Holmes, and two sons, Jehangir (died 1944) and Hirji (3rd Baronet). The Jehangir Art Gallery in Mumbai and the Jehangir Hospital in Pune are named in memory of their elder son, who died in a car accident in 1944, leaving behind a wife (Mehroo, d/o Sir Dhunjibhoy Bomanjee) but no children.
- Sir Hirji Jehangir, 3rd Baronet (1915–2000). Born 1 November 1915, he married Jinoo, daughter of Kakushroo (Kaikhusrau) Cama, on 10 August 1952. They had two sons, Cowasji (4th Baronet) and Ardeshir.
- Sir Cowasji Jehangir (JHC), 4th Baronet (born 1953). Runs the Jehangir hospital in Pune and a few business companies. He is a trustee in some of the Tata Trusts. Married to Jasmine, daughter of Beji Billimoria since 1988, he is the father of two children, a son Cowasji (b. 1990), and a daughter Simone (b. 1994), named in honour of Simone Tata.

The heir apparent is the present holder's only son, Cowasji Jehangir (born 1990).

== Notes ==
Baronetage of the United Kingdom
Preceded by Leese baronets	Jehangir baronets of Bombay; 16 July 1908	Succeeded by Brunton baronets
