= Keykavus, Khuzestan =

Keykavus كيكاوس
- Village
- Location within Iran
- Coordinates: 30°44′19″N 50°10′12″E
- Country: Iran
- Province: Khuzestan
- County: Behbahan
- Bakhsh: Central
- Rural District: Dodangeh

Population (2006)
  - Total: 446
- Time zone: UTC+3:30 (IRST)
  - Summer (DST): UTC+4:30 (IRDT)

Keykavus (Persian: كيكاوس, also Romanized as Keykāvūs, Kai Kāūs, Keikavoos, and Keykāvos; also known as Keykāvūs-e Bālā and Kni Kāūs) is a village in Dodangeh Rural District, in the Central District of Behbahan County, Khuzestan Province, Iran. At the 2006 census, its population was 446, in 87 families.
