= Kawas, Pakistan =

Coordinates: 30°27′56″N 67°34′56″E

Kawas
- Town and union council
- Interactive map of Kawas
- Country: Pakistan
- Region: Balochistan
- District: Ziarat District
- Time zone: UTC+5 (PST)

Kawas is a town and union council of Ziarat District in the Balochistan province of Pakistan. It is located at 30°27'56N 67°34'56E and has an altitude of 2116m (6945ft). The indigenous tribes settled here are Kakar, Dotani and Tareen (including Raisani).
