= Cowasji Jehangir =

British-Indian Baronet (1879–1962)

Sir Cowasji Jehangir Bt, GBE, KCIE
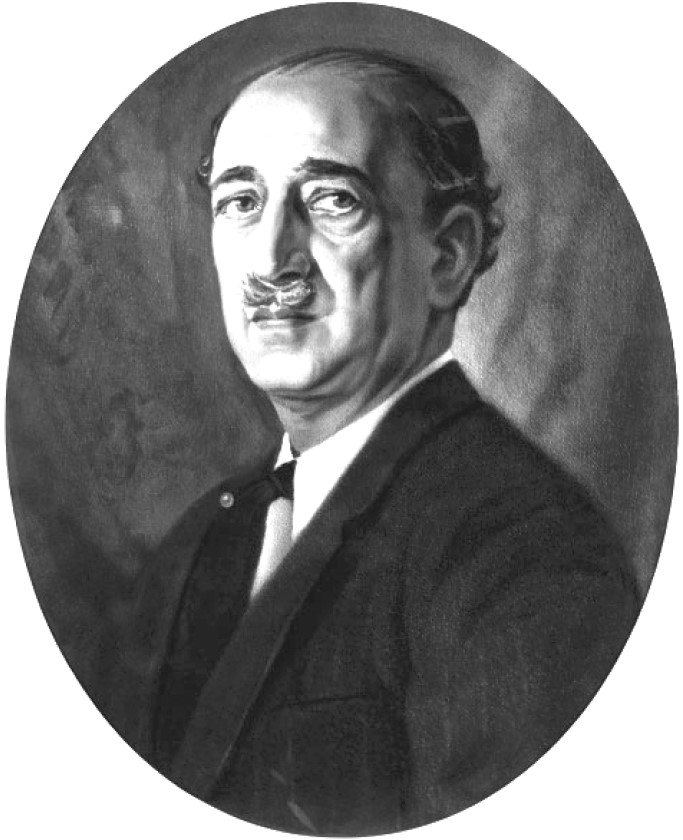
- Born: February 16, 1879
- Died: October 17, 1962 (aged 83)
- Education: St. John's, Cambridge
- Father: Cowasji Jehangir, 1st Bt.

Sir Cowasji Jehangir, 2nd Baronet, (16 February 1879 – 17 October 1962) was a prominent member of the Bombay Parsi community. He was the son of Sir Jehangir Cowasji Jehangir Readymoney, 1st Bt. (1853–1934) and grand-nephew of Sir Cowasji Jehangir Readymoney (1812–1878). He was educated at St John's College, Cambridge.

Cowasji Jehangir campaigned for a prominent role for the Parsi Zoroastrian community in independent India. He had become a member of the "Western India National Liberation Federation", at its founding in 1919, and was elected its president in 1936 and 1937. He was also active in the reactionary "Parsee Central Committee", which was critical of Congress Parsis like Dadabhai Naoroji and Pherozeshah Mehta.

At the second "Round Table Conference" in London during 1930–1932, where the framework for the political and constitutional future of India was laid down, he was one of the three political "liberals" to represent the Parsi community. To the Minorities Committee and the Franchise Committee he advocated a graded franchise based on the standard of education which would have given the Parsis an immense over-representation in future elections. Such a scheme was never taken seriously by any other party in the discussions.

After 1939, when it was apparent that independence was to come in a short while, a large number of Parsis became active in the "Western India National Liberation Federation", whose meetings were often held at his home. As a last-ditch effort, on the eve of independence in 1945, he pleaded to the Viceroy in a telegram not to forget the claims of the Parsis. This appeal, made as the president of the "Parsee Central Association" was nullified by a telegram from a group of Parsis calling themselves the "Freedom Group" which rejected any special privilege for the Parsis.

== Legacy ==
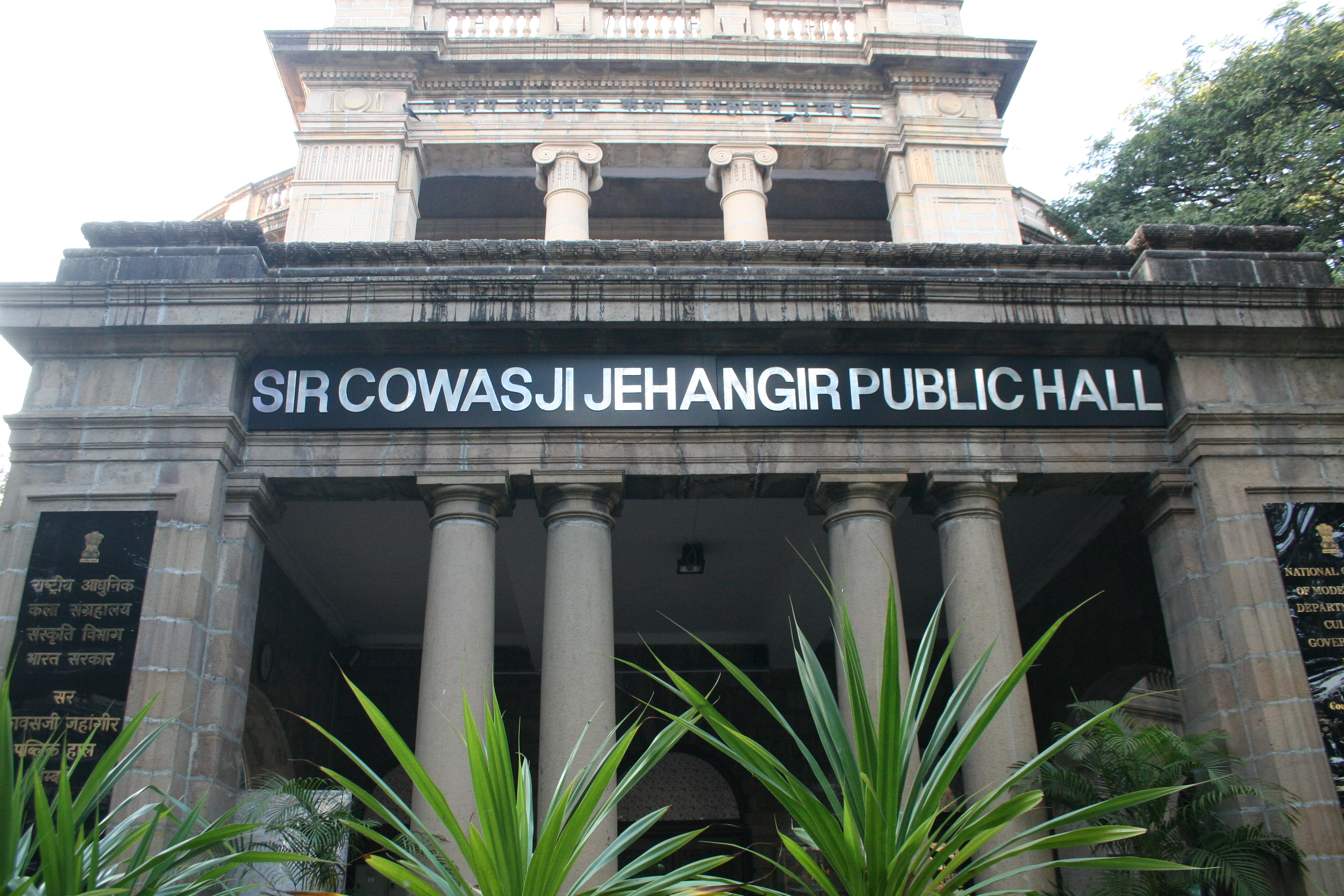
Sir Cowasji Jhangir Public Hall

The Jehangir Art Gallery was established in 1952 in memory of his late son, the Cowasji Jehangir Hall and Jehangir Institute of Psychiatry are named after him. The Readymoney Nursing Home (now Jehangir Hospital) in Pune was founded on property donated by Sir Cowasji and his wife Lady Hirabai. Originally named Readymoney Villa, it was renamed in 1944 after their son Jehangir Cowasji Jehangir, who died in an accident that year.

== See also ==
- Jehangir baronets

Baronetage of the United Kingdom
Preceded by Jehangir Cowasji Jehangir Readymoney	Baronet (of Bombay); 1934–1962	Succeeded by Hirji Jehangir
