= Cowasji Jehangir Hall =

Public hall in Mumbai, India

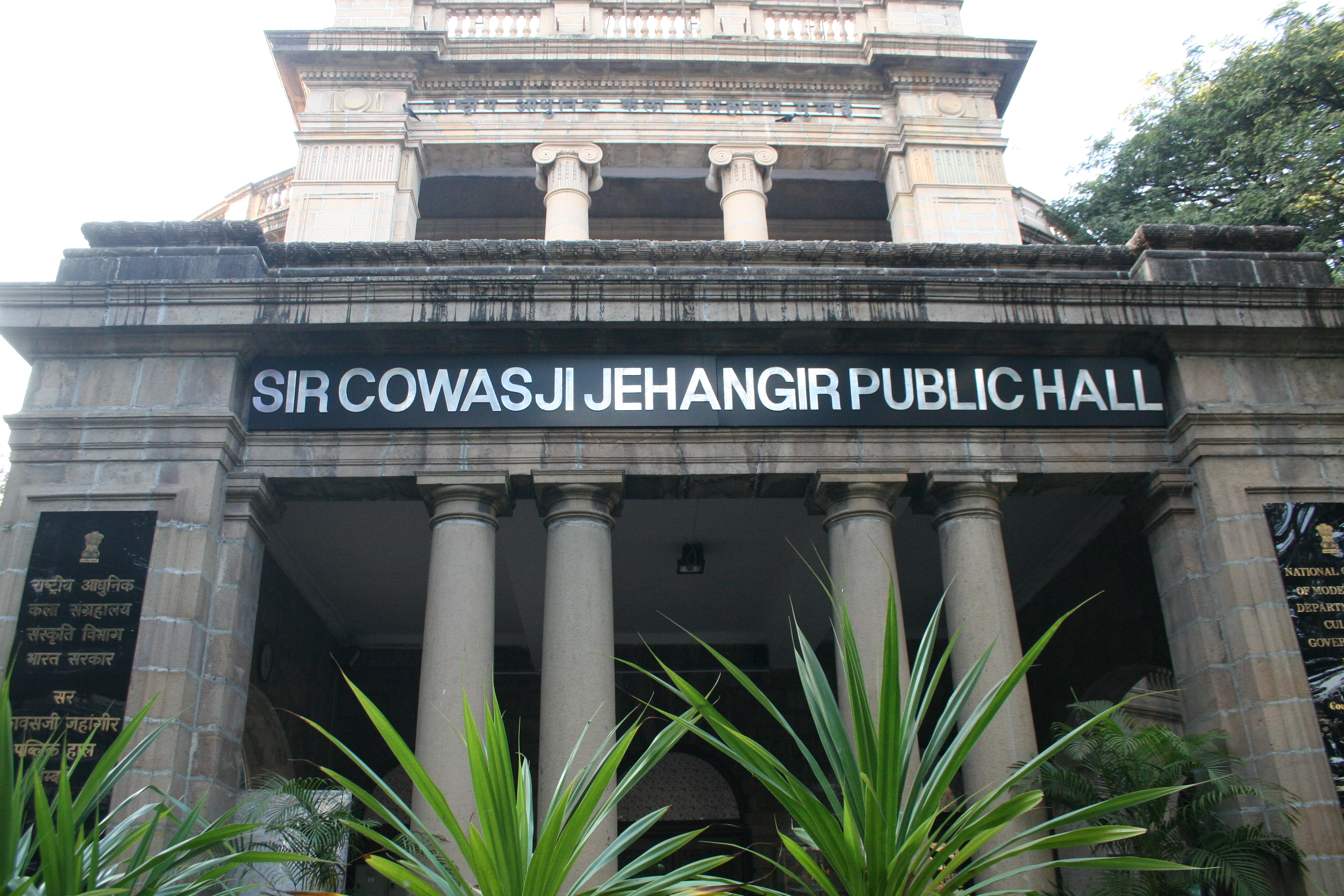

General information
- Location: Mumbai, Maharashtra, India
- Coordinates: 18.9285838°N 72.8284582°E
- Current tenants: National Gallery of Modern Art, Mumbai
- Named for: Sir Cowasji Jehangir
- Completed: 1911

Design and construction
- Architect: George Wittet

Sir Cowasji Jehangir Public Hall is a museum of modern art and was part of the Institute of Science prior to 1996. The hall was built in 1911 by George Wittet and funded by Cowasji Jehangir. It is located in Colaba area of Mumbai, India.

== History ==
In 1911, Cowasji Jehangir Hall was constructed, named after Sir Cowasji Jehangir because major part of funding was done by him, while the rest of the funds were given by another two philanthropists of Mumbai, Sir Jacob Sassoon and Sir Currimbhoy Ibrahim.

In the initial days, this was the only Hall available at Colaba area and the Hall was busy and well maintained till the 1950s. However, in the later period, new auditoriums were built in Mumbai, which fact made this Hall unsought for, at one point of time this venue came under the threat of different kinds of uses, making art lovers upset. It is at that time that National Art Gallery came in the picture to make it a functional museum.

In 1996, the National Gallery of Modern Art, Mumbai was set up in the building.
