= Jehangir Cowasji Jehangir Readymoney =

Sir Jehangir Cowasji Jehangir Readymoney, 1st Baronet, KCIE (8 June 1853 – 26 July 1934) was a prominent member of the Bombay Parsi community.

He was the nephew and heir to the childless Sir Cowasji Jehangir Readymoney (1812–1878). He married Dhunbai (b. 1860 – d. 1940), daughter of Ardeshir Hormusjee Wadia of the Wadia family, another wealthy Bombay-based Parsi family.

Jehangir Cowasji Jehangir Readymoney was knighted in 1895 and created baronet in 1908. He was succeeded by Sir Cowasji Jehangir Readymoney, 2nd Bt. (1879–1962), who however dropped the 'Readymoney' sobriquet.

Baronetage of the United Kingdom
New creation	Baronet (of Bombay); 1908–1934	Succeeded by Cowasji Jehangir
