= Cowasji Jehangir Readymoney =

Indian businessman (1812–1878)

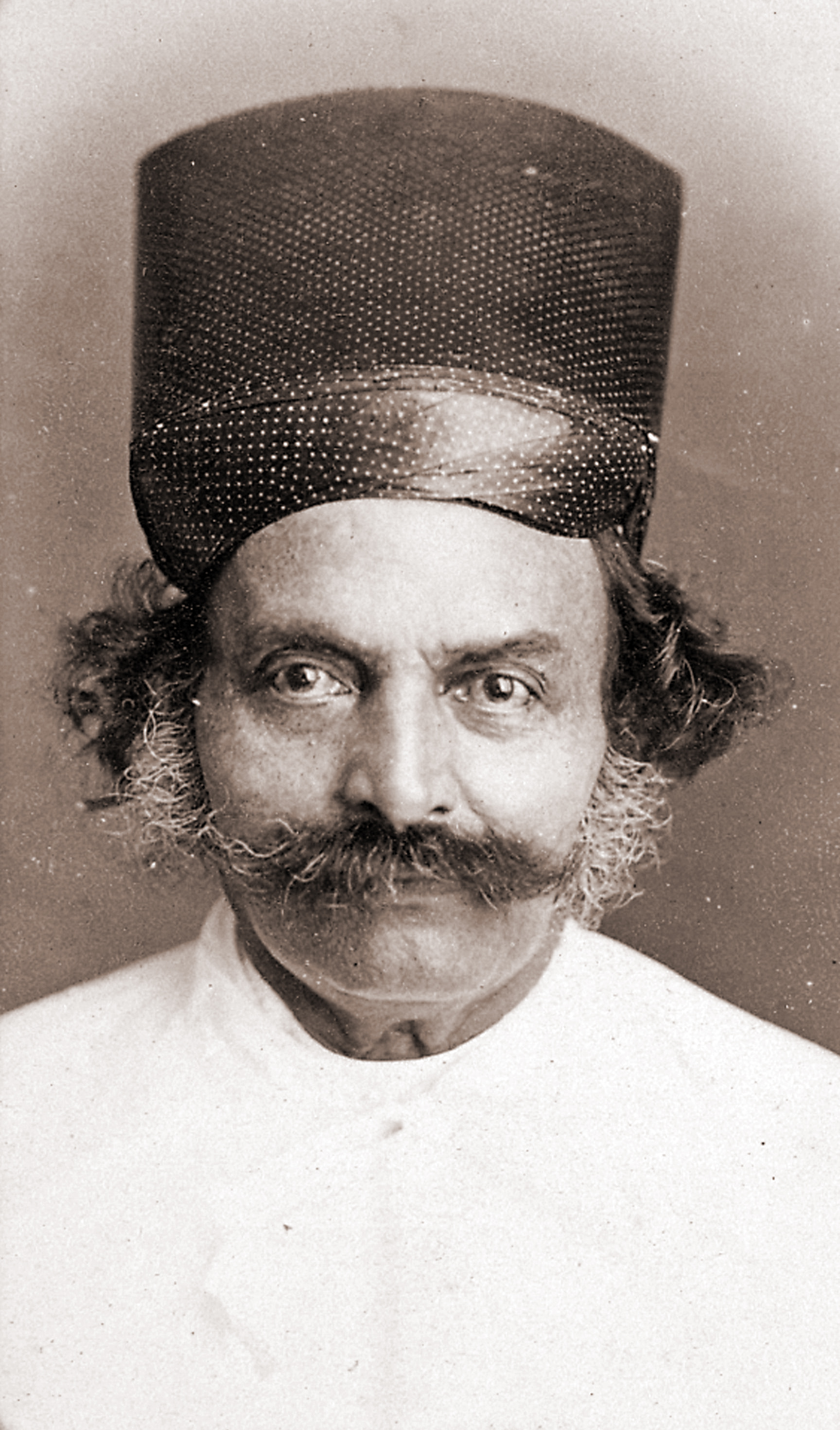
Sir Cowasji Jehangir Readymoney, CSI (1812–1878).

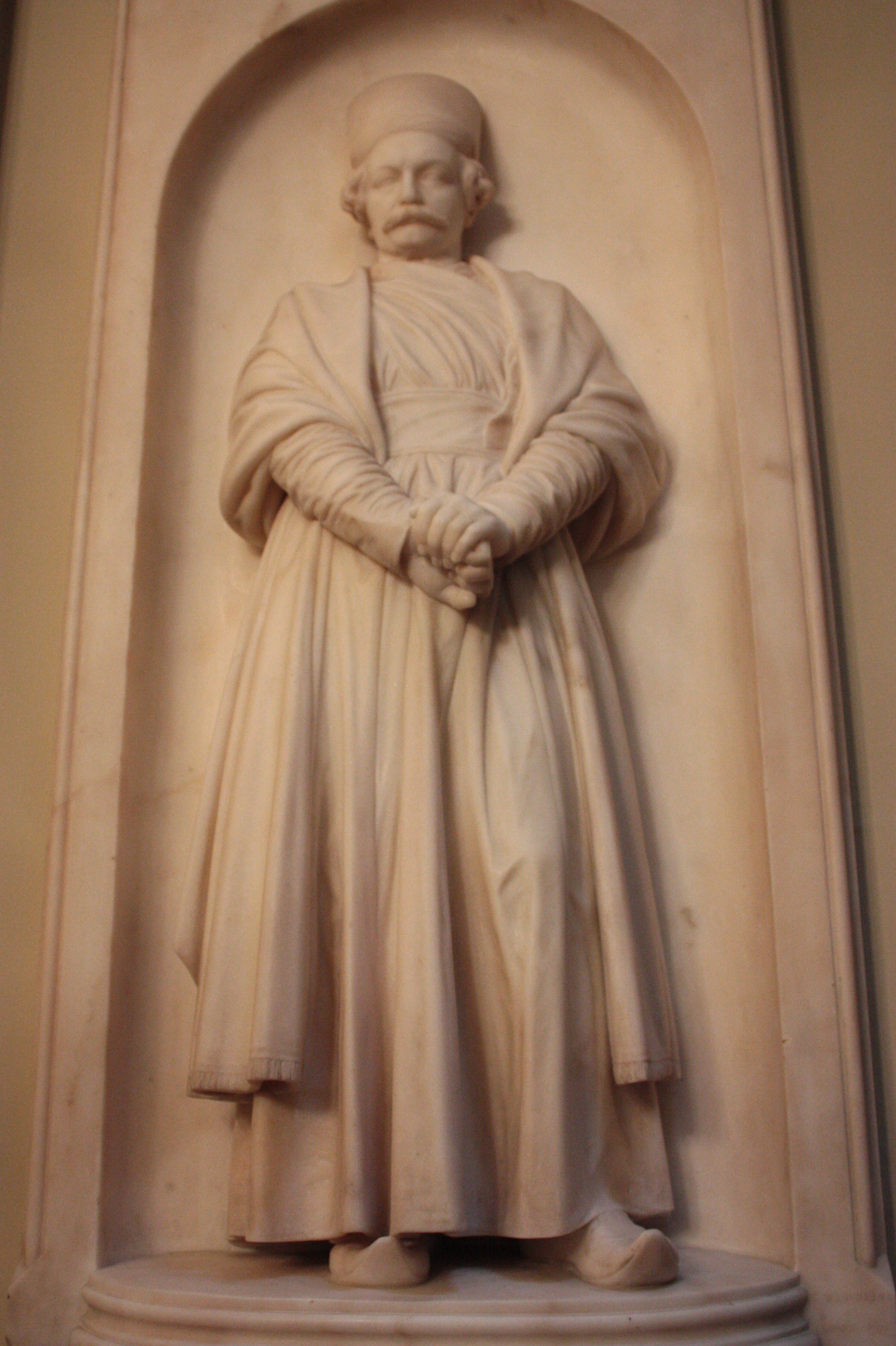
High relief sculpture of Cowasji Jehangir by Thomas Woolner, Old College, University of Edinburgh

Sir Cowasji Jehangir Readymoney, CSI (24 May 1812 – 19 July 1878) was a Parsi community leader, philanthropist and industrialist of Bombay, India.

== Family and background ==
Cowasji Jehangir Readymoney came from a wealthy Parsi family. His great-grandfather and two great-uncles had moved in the early 18th century from Navsari near Surat to Bombay and had become pioneers in the lucrative opium trade with China. The brothers were cash-rich and worked as bankers for various British clients, and they earned for themselves the sobriquet "Readymoney," which they later adopted as a surname.

Among the three brothers, only Hirji Jewanji Readymoney had surviving issue, two daughters. He arranged in the usual Indian way for them to marry into families of their own community and similar background. The girls were married into wealthy Parsi families; the elder married a Banaji, the younger a Dady Sett (or Dadiseth).

In the next generation, the son of the elder daughter, Jehangir Hirji, married the daughter of the younger daughter, Mirbai, again in a match arranged by their families in the usual Indian way. Jehangir Hirji was designated the heir of his grandfather and his two granduncles. He and Mirbai had two sons. The elder was the father of Jehangir Cowasji Jehangir Readymoney and the younger was Cowasji Jehangir, the subject of this page.

== Business career ==
Cowasji Jehangir Readymoney's only formal education was at the (then) well-known school kept by Serjeant Sykes at one of Bombay's forts. At the age of 15, Readymoney entered the firm of Duncan, Gibb & Co. as "godown keeper," or warehouse clerk.

In 1837 Readymoney was promoted to the responsible and lucrative appointment of "guarantee broker" to two leading European firms in Bombay. By 1846 he was able to begin trading on his own account. In 1866 Readymoney was appointed a commissioner of income tax, his tactful management being largely responsible for the fact that this tax, then new to Bombay and unpopular, was levied with unexpected financial success.

== Public service and philanthropy ==
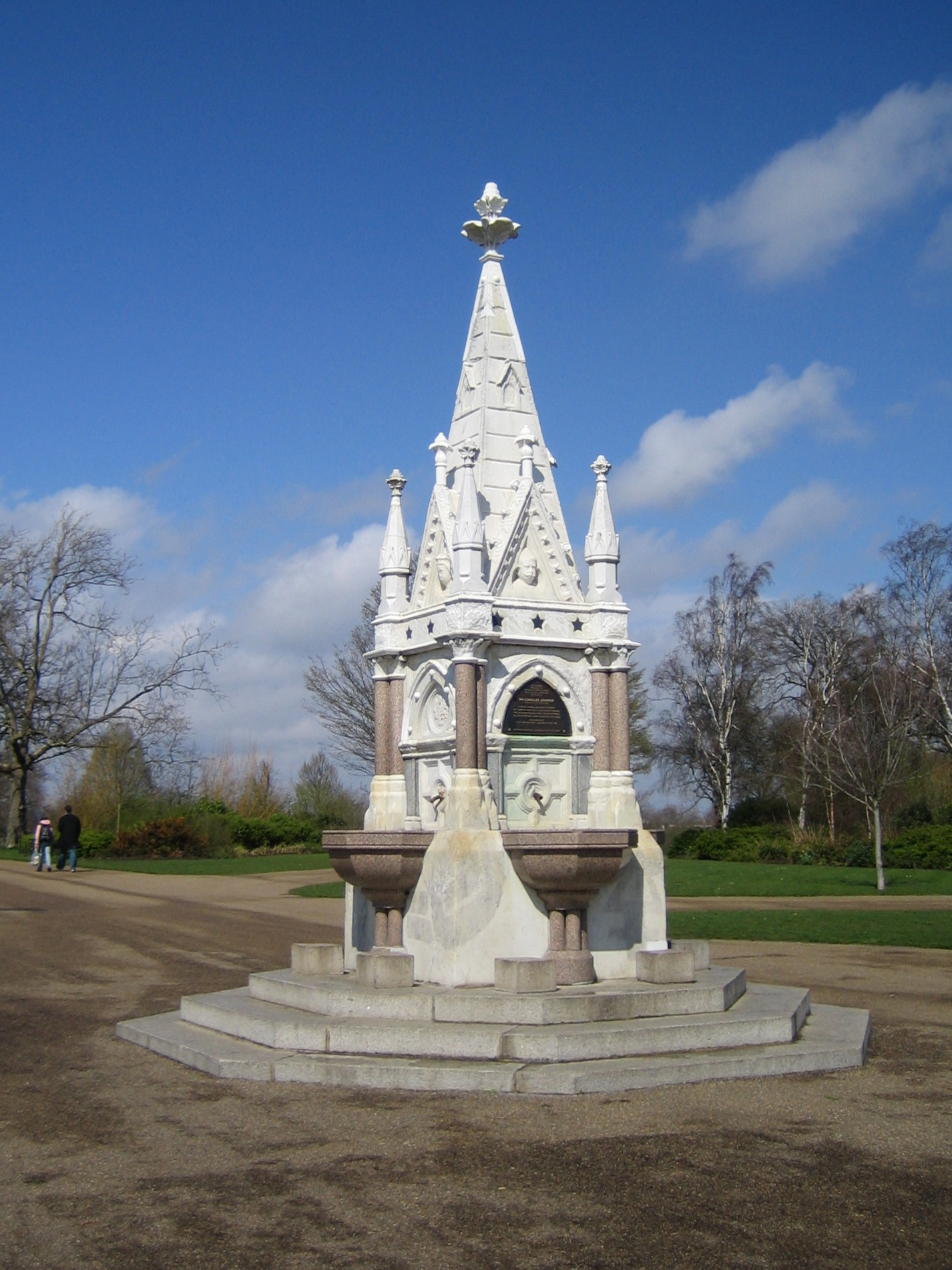
Readymoney Drinking Fountain, erected by Cowasji Jehangir Readymoney in Regent's Park, London

Readymoney was appointed Justice of the Peace for the town and island of Bombay and a member of the Board of Conservancy. He was invested as a Companion of The Most Exalted Order of the Star of India (C.S.I) in 1871. In 1872, he was created a Knight Bachelor of the United Kingdom in recognition of his donations to the Indian Institute in London and other charitable causes in Bombay amounting to approximately £200,000.

Readymoney built colleges, hospitals, insane asylums; founded a refuge for people of "respectability" who found themselves destitute or friendless in Bombay; erected several drinking fountains of artistic merit; gave donations to the Catholic and the Presbyterian missions in India. He financed the erection, in 1869, of the Readymoney Drinking Fountain in Regent's Park, London, which was opened by the Princess of Teck, as a mark of gratitude from the Parsi community to the protection that British rule in India had given them.

Readymoney had a particular association with University of Bombay and he financed the erection of several notable buildings there, including the Convocation Hall designed by Sir George Gilbert Scott. Readymoney was also a member of the university's Faculty of Civil Engineering and its Senate. A statue of Readymoney, by Thomas Woolner, stands on the campus grounds. There is also a small bas-relief sculpture of him at the University of Edinburgh but Readymoney's connection to that establishment is unknown.

During his lifetime, Readymoney was known as the Peabody of Bombay. The reason for this epithet is unknown, but may be a reference to London's Peabody Trust, since Jehangir owned several large housing estates and is said to have identified himself with George Peabody.

== Death ==
After a long illness, Readymoney died in 1878. His nephew and adopted son and heir, Jehangir Cowasji Jehangir Readymoney, was created a Knight Bachelor (in 1895) and a Baronet (in 1908).

== See also ==
- Jehangir Baronets
