= Muhammad Ali Jinnah's 11 August Speech =

1947 Pakistani speech

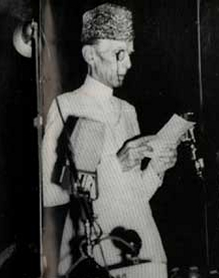
Quaid-e-Azam Muhammad Ali Jinnah at the Constitutional Assembly.

Muhammad Ali Jinnah's 11 August Speech is a speech made by Muhammad Ali Jinnah, founding father of Pakistan and known as Quaid-e-Azam (Great Leader) to the Constituent Assembly of Pakistan. While Pakistan was created as a result of what could be described as "Indian Muslim nationalism", Jinnah was once an ambassador of Hindu-Muslim unity. When the British Raj finally ended, Jinnah, soon-to-be Governor-General of the Dominion of Pakistan, outlined his vision of Pakistan in an address to the Constituent Assembly, delivered on 11 August 1947. He spoke of an inclusive and impartial government, religious freedom, rule of law, and equality for all.

He opened by saying the Assembly had two tasks: Writing a provisional constitution and governing the country meantime. He continued with a list of urgent problems:

- Law and order, so life, property, and religious beliefs are protected for all.
- Bribery
- Black-marketing
- Nepotism

Next, he discussed at length the partition, saying many were dissatisfied with the details but a united India would never have worked. He urged forgiveness of bygone quarrels among Pakistanis, so all can be "[...] first, second and last a citizen of this State with equal rights [...]". Pointing out that England in past centuries had settled its fierce sectarian persecutions, he proposed that "in course of time Hindus would cease to be Hindus and Muslims would cease to be Muslims, not in the religious sense, because that is the personal faith of each individual, but in the political sense as citizens of the State."

He concluded by quoting a friendly, official message from the United States.

== Context ==
Quaid’s 11 August speech was not an ideological fence-jump but a tactical, one-off reconciliatory statement amid the bloodshed and massacre of migrating populations by Hindus and Muslims alike. Dilip Hiro says that "extracts of this speech were widely disseminated" in order to abort the communal violence in Punjab and the NWFP, where Muslims and Sikh-Hindus were butchering each other, which disturbed Jinnah on a personal level, but "the tactic had little, if any, impact on the horrendous barbarity that was being perpetrated on the plains of Punjab."

Pakistan is an ideological state and the only country to have been created in the name of Islam. Indian scholar, Venkat Dhulipala, in his book Creating a New Medina, unequivocally attests that Pakistan was meant to be a new Medina, an Islamic state, and not merely a state for Muslims. It was meant to be ideological from the beginning, with no space for composite nationalism. In an interview, he also says that the speech "was made primarily keeping in mind the tremendous violence that was going on" and that it was "directed at protecting Muslims from even greater violence in areas where they were vulnerable," which was pure "pragmatism." Subsequently, a few months later, when asked about the prospect of opening the "Muslim League to all Pakistanis, irrespective of their religion or creed," the same Jinnah simply refused, saying, "Pakistan was not ready for it."

In a reply to an American journalist, Margaret White, who was the first foreign correspondent to interview Quaid after independence, he boasted, "It’s not just the largest Islamic nation. Pakistan is the fifth-largest nation in the world!" He used the word "Islamic," not "Muslim." This interview was conducted just one month after the creation of Pakistan.

Many of Quaid's post-partition speeches present irrefutable evidence about the Islamic posture of the future constitution. Addressing the Karachi Bar Association on 25 January 1948, he said, "I could not understand a section of people who deliberately wanted to create mischief and made propaganda that the constitution of Pakistan would not be made on the basis of Sharia." He continued, "Islamic principles have no parallels. Today, these principles are as applicable to life as they were 1,300 years ago."

Just a few weeks later, on 14 February 1948, at the Sibi Durbar, he reiterated his ideology of Pakistan, saying, "It is my belief that our salvation lies in following the golden rules of conduct set for us by our great lawgiver, the Prophet (PBUH) of Islam. Let us lay the foundation of our democracy on the basis of truly Islamic ideals and principles."

== 21st century ==
2007 is the 60th anniversary of Jinnah's speech prompted the Pakistani religious minorities, including Christians, Hindus, and Sikhs to hold a large rally to celebrate Jinnah's legacy at the Minar-e-Pakistan calling for the implementation of Jinnah's vision in letter and spirit.

L K Advani, an Indian politician, visited Pakistan in June 2005. He created a scandal in India, by referring to Jinnah as a great leader and described his speech to the Constituent Assembly as a truly secular charter, worthy of emulation. In Jinnah's Mausoleum, he wrote:

There are many people who leave an irreversible stamp on history. But there are few who actually create history. Qaed-e-Azam Mohammed Ali Jinnah was one such rare individual. In his early years, leading luminary of freedom struggle Sarojini Naidu described Jinnah as an ambassador of Hindu-Muslim unity. His address to the Constituent Assembly of Pakistan on 11 August 1947 is really a classic and a forceful espousal of a secular state in which every citizen would be free to follow his own religion. The State shall make no distinction between the citizens on the grounds of faith. My respectful homage to this great man.

Advani came under intense criticism from his party, the Hindu Nationalist Bharatiya Janata Party, which has long blamed Jinnah for being solely responsible for India's partition along communal lines. Ultimately, Advani was forced to quit as party chief, despite vindication from the media.

== See also ==
- Secularism in Pakistan
