= Muhammad Ali Jinnah =

Founder and 1st Governor-General of Pakistan (1876–1948)

Baba-e-Qaum Quaid-e-Azam Muhammad Ali Jinnah
- محمد علی جناح
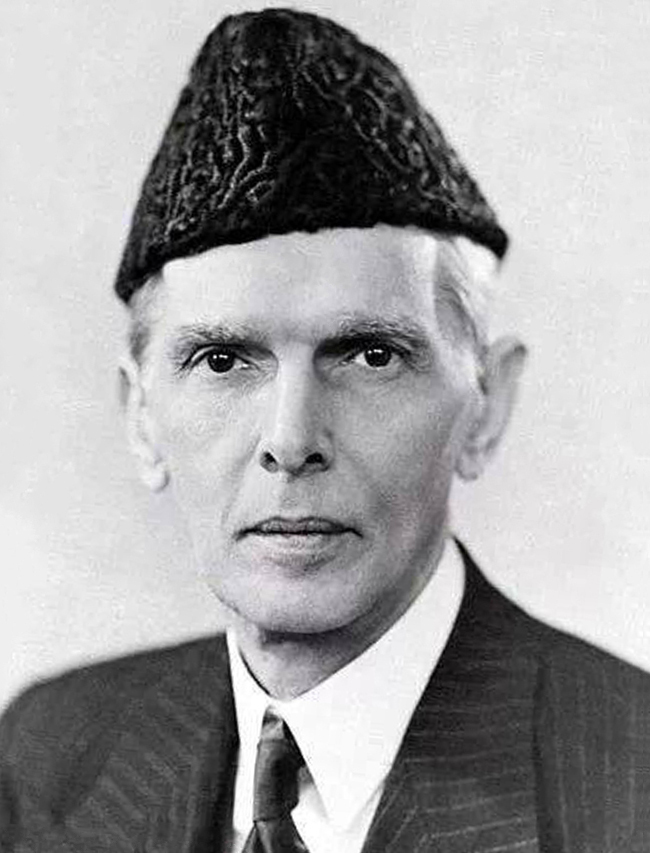
- Formal portrait, c. 1945

1st Governor-General of Pakistan
- In office 14 August 1947 – 11 September 1948
- Monarch: George VI
- Prime Minister: Liaquat Ali Khan
- Preceded by: Position established
- Succeeded by: Khawaja Nazimuddin

1st Speaker of the Constituent Assembly
- In office 11 August 1947 – 11 September 1948
- Deputy: Maulvi Tamizuddin Khan
- Preceded by: Position established
- Succeeded by: Maulvi Tamizuddin Khan

President of the Muslim League
- In office 15 December 1947 – 11 September 1948
- Preceded by: Position established
- Succeeded by: Liaquat Ali Khan

Personal details
- Born: Mahomedali Jinnahbhai; 25 December 1876 Karachi, Bombay Presidency, British India
- Died: 11 September 1948 (aged 71) Karachi, Pakistan
- Resting place: Mazar-e-Quaid
- Party: Muslim League (1947–1948)
- Other political affiliations: Indian National Congress (1906–1920); All-India Muslim League (1913–1947)
- Spouses: Emibai Jinnah (m. 1892; died 1893) Rattanbai Petit (m. 1918; died 1929)
- Relations: Jinnah family
- Children: Dina Wadia
- Parent: Jinnahbhai Poonja (father)
- Education: Lincoln's Inn
- Profession: Barrister; politician

Muhammad Ali Jinnah (Note: Urdu: محمد علی جناح; [mʊɦəmːəd̪ əli d͡ʒɪnɑː(ɦ)]) (born Mahomedali Jinnahbhai; (Note: Gujarati: માહમદ અલી ઝીણાભાઈ; [mɑɦməd̪ əli dʒʱiɳɑbʱəi]) 25 December 1876 – 11 September 1948) was a barrister, statesman, and the founder of Pakistan. He served as the leader of the All-India Muslim League from 1913 until the independence of Pakistan on 14 August 1947, and then as the first Governor-General of Pakistan until his death a year later in 1948.

Born at Wazir Mansion in Karachi, Jinnah was trained as a barrister at Lincoln's Inn in London, England. Upon his return to India, he enrolled at the Bombay High Court, and took an interest in national politics, which eventually replaced his legal practice. Jinnah rose to prominence in the Indian National Congress in the first two decades of the 20th century. In these early years of his political career, Jinnah advocated for Hindu–Muslim unity, helping to shape the 1916 Lucknow Pact between the Congress and the All-India Muslim League, in which Jinnah had also become prominent. Jinnah became a key leader in the All-India Home Rule League, and proposed a fourteen-point constitutional reform plan to safeguard the political rights of Muslims in the Indian subcontinent. In 1920, however, Jinnah resigned from the Congress when it agreed to follow a campaign of satyagraha, which he regarded as political anarchy.

After joining the All-India Muslim League, Jinnah worked for the rights of Muslims in the subcontinent to protect them from the threat of marginalisation in a Hindu-dominated state. In 1940, the Muslim League, led by Jinnah, passed the Lahore Resolution. During the Second World War, the League gained strength while leaders of the Congress were imprisoned, and in the provincial elections held shortly after the war, it won most of the seats reserved for Muslims. Ultimately, the Congress and the Muslim League could not reach a power-sharing formula that would allow the entirety of British India to be united as a single state following independence, leading all parties to agree instead to the independence of a Hindu-majority India, and for a predominantly Muslim state of Pakistan.

As the first governor-general of Pakistan, Jinnah worked to establish the government of the new nation and policies to aid the millions of Muslim migrants who had emigrated from regions that became part of the Dominion of India to Pakistan after the independence of both states, personally supervising the establishment of refugee camps. Jinnah died at age 71 in September 1948, just over a year after Pakistan gained independence from the United Kingdom. He left a deep and respected legacy in Pakistan. Several universities and public buildings in Pakistan bear Jinnah's name. He is revered in Pakistan as the Quaid-e-Azam ("Great Leader") and Baba-e-Qaum ("Father of the Nation"). His birthday is also observed as a national holiday in the country. According to his biographer, Stanley Wolpert, Jinnah remains Pakistan's greatest leader.

== Early years ==
=== Family and childhood ===
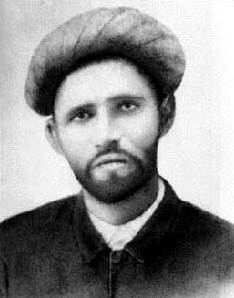
Portrait of Jinnah's father, Jinnahbhai Poonja

Jinnah's given name at birth was Mahomedali Jinnahbhai, and he likely was born on 25 December 1876, (Note: While Jinnah's birthday is celebrated as 25 December 1876, there is reason to doubt that date. Karachi did not then issue birth certificates, no record was kept by his family (birth dates being of little importance to Muslims of the time), and his school records reflect a birth date of 20 October 1875. See Bolitho, p. 3.) to Jinnahbhai Poonja and his wife Mithibai Jinnah, in a rented apartment on the second floor of Wazir Mansion near Karachi, now in Sindh, Pakistan, but then within the Bombay Presidency of British India. Jinnah's paternal grandfather lived in Gondal State in Kathiawar peninsula (now in Gujarat, India). He himself had a background of following Nizari Isma'ili branch of Shia Islam in Gujarat, though he later followed Twelver Shi'a teachings. After his death, his relatives and other witnesses claimed that he had converted later on in life to Sunni Islam.

Jinnah was from a wealthy merchant background. His father was a merchant and was born to a family of textile weavers in the village of Paneli in the princely state of Gondal; his mother was from the nearby village of Dhaffa. They had moved to Karachi in 1875, having married before their departure. Karachi was then enjoying an economic boom: the opening of the Suez Canal in 1869 meant it was 200 nautical miles closer to Europe for shipping than Bombay. Jinnah was the eldest child; he had three brothers and four sisters, including his younger sister Fatima Jinnah and younger brother Ahmed Ali Jinnah. Jinnah was not fluent in Gujarati, his mother-tongue, nor in Urdu; he was more fluent in English. Except for Fatima, little is known of his siblings, where they settled or if they met with their brother as he advanced in his legal and political careers.

As a boy, Jinnah lived for a time in Bombay with an aunt and may have attended the Gokal Das Tej Primary School there, later on studying at the Cathedral and John Connon School. In Karachi, he attended the Sindh Madressatul Islam and the Christian Missionary Society High School. He completed his matriculation from Bombay University. In his later years and especially after his death, a large number of stories about the boyhood of Pakistan's founder were circulated: that he spent all his spare time at the police court, listening to the proceedings, and that he studied his books by the glow of street lights for lack of other illumination. His official biographer, Hector Bolitho, writing in 1954, interviewed surviving boyhood associates, and obtained a tale that the young Jinnah discouraged other children from playing marbles in the dust, urging them to rise up, keep their hands and clothes clean, and play cricket instead.

=== Education in England ===
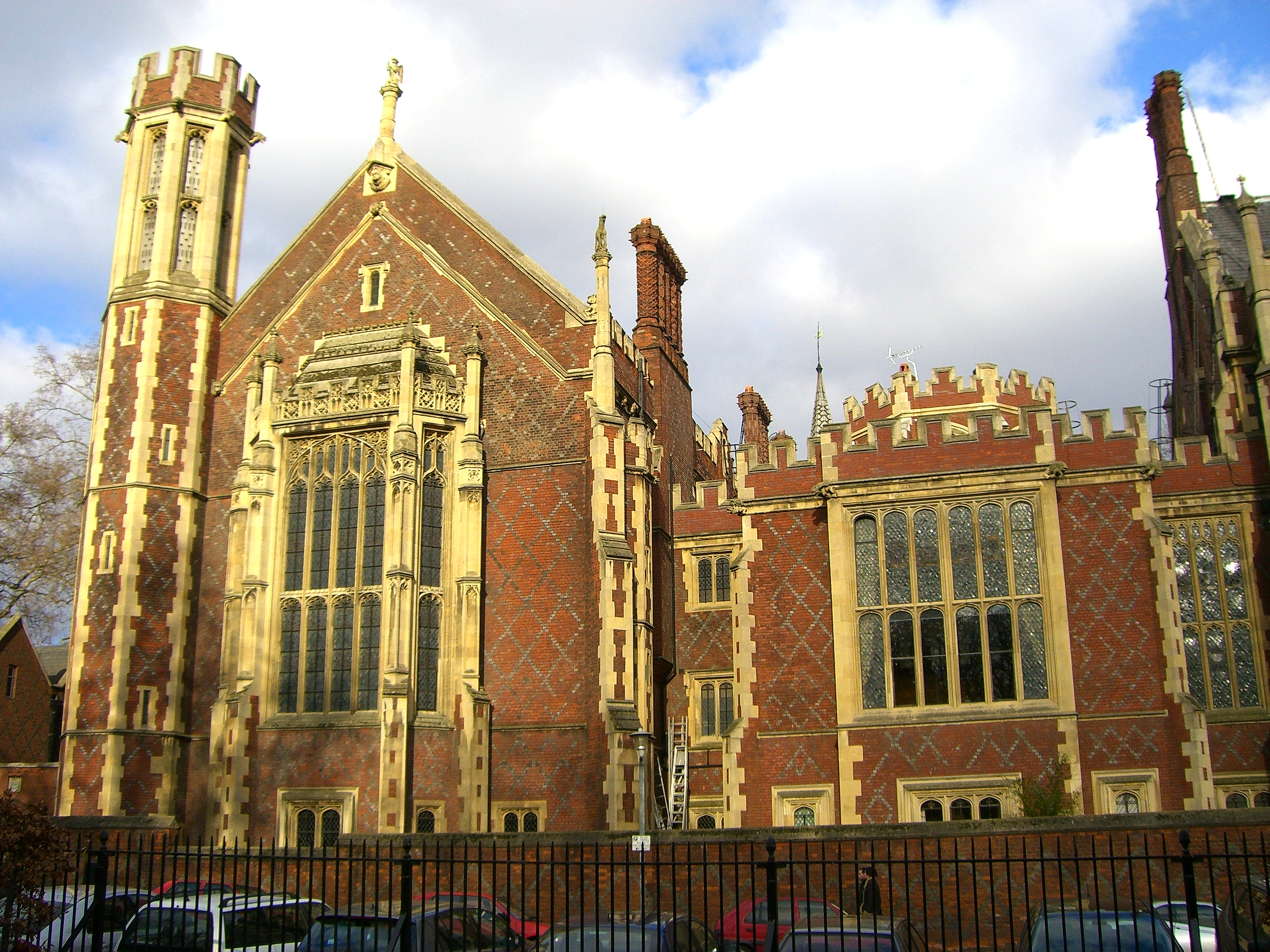
Lincoln's Inn, seen in 2006

In 1892, Sir Frederick Leigh Croft, a business associate of Jinnahbhai Poonja, offered young Jinnah a London apprenticeship with his firm, Graham's Shipping and Trading Company. He accepted the position despite the opposition of his mother, who before he left, had him enter an arranged marriage with his cousin, two years his junior from the ancestral village of Paneli, Emibai Jinnah. Jinnah's mother and first wife both died during his absence in England. Although the apprenticeship in London was considered a great opportunity for Jinnah, one reason for sending him overseas was a legal proceeding against his father, which placed the family's property at risk of being sequestered by the court. In 1893, the Jinnahbhai family moved to Bombay.

Soon after his arrival in London, Jinnah gave up the business apprenticeship to study law, enraging his father, who had, before his departure, given him enough money to live for three years. The aspiring barrister joined Lincoln's Inn, later stating that the reason he chose Lincoln's over the other Inns of Court was that over the main entrance to Lincoln's Inn were the names of the world's great lawgivers, including Muhammad. Jinnah's biographer Stanley Wolpert notes that there is no such inscription, but inside is a mural showing Muhammad and other lawgivers, and speculates that Jinnah may have edited the story in his own mind to avoid mentioning a pictorial depiction which would be offensive to many Muslims. Jinnah's legal education followed the pupillage (legal apprenticeship) system, which had been in force there for centuries. To gain knowledge of the law, he followed an established barrister and learned from what he did, as well as from studying lawbooks. During this period, he shortened his name to Muhammad Ali Jinnah.

During his student years in England, Jinnah was influenced by 19th-century British liberalism, like many other future Indian independence leaders. His main intellectual references were peoples like Jeremy Bentham, John Stuart Mill, Herbert Spencer, and Auguste Comte. This political education included exposure to the idea of the democratic nation, and progressive politics. He became an admirer of the Parsi British Indian political leaders Dadabhai Naoroji and Sir Pherozeshah Mehta. Naoroji had become the first British Member of Parliament of Indian extraction shortly before Jinnah's arrival, triumphing with a majority of three votes in Finsbury Central. Jinnah listened to Naoroji's maiden speech in the House of Commons from the visitor's gallery.

The Western world not only inspired Jinnah in his political life, but also greatly influenced his personal preferences, particularly when it came to dress. Jinnah abandoned local garb for Western-style clothing, and throughout his life he was always impeccably dressed in public. He came to own over 200 suits, which he wore with heavily starched shirts with detachable collars, and as a barrister took pride in never wearing the same silk tie twice. Even when he was dying, he insisted on being formally dressed, "I will not travel in my pyjamas." In his later years he was usually seen wearing a Karakul hat which subsequently came to be known as the "Jinnah cap".

Dissatisfied with the law, Jinnah briefly embarked on a stage career with a Shakespearean company, but resigned after receiving a stern letter from his father. In 1895, at age 19, he became the youngest British Indian to be called to the bar in England. Although he returned to Karachi, he remained there only a short time before moving to Bombay.

== Legal and early political career ==
=== Barrister ===
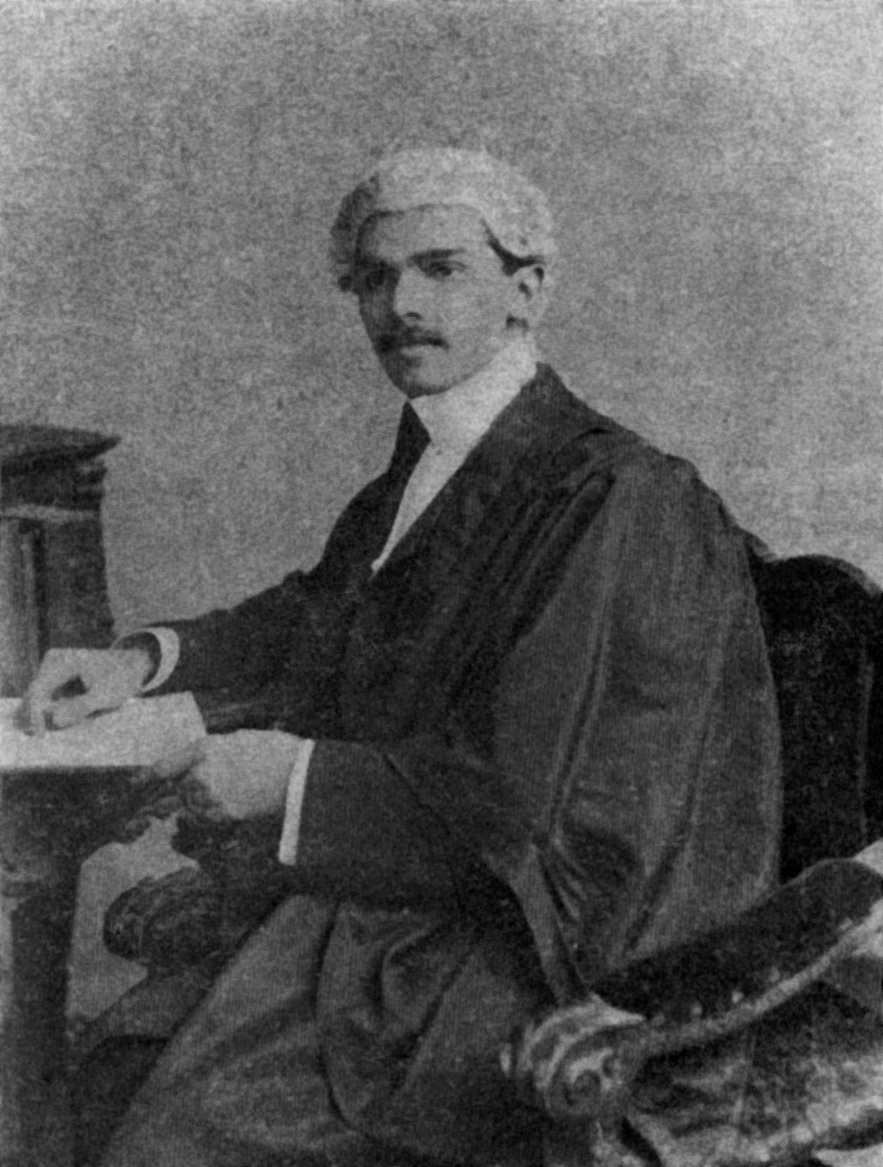
Jinnah as a barrister

At the age of 20, Jinnah began his practice in Bombay, the only Muslim barrister in the city. English had become his principal language and would remain so throughout his life. His first three years in the law, from 1897 to 1900, brought him few briefs. His first step towards a brighter career occurred when the acting Advocate General of Bombay, John Molesworth MacPherson, invited Jinnah to work from his chambers. In 1900, P. H. Dastoor, a Bombay presidency magistrate, left the post temporarily and Jinnah succeeded in getting the interim position. After his six-month appointment period, Jinnah was offered a permanent position on a 1,500 rupee per month salary. Jinnah politely declined the offer, stating that he planned to earn 1,500 rupees a day—a huge sum at that time—which he eventually did. Nevertheless, as Governor-General of Pakistan, he would refuse to accept a large salary, fixing it at 1 rupee per month.

As a lawyer, Jinnah gained fame for his skilled handling of the 1908 "Caucus Case". This controversy arose out of Bombay municipal elections, which Indians alleged were rigged by a "caucus" of Europeans to keep Sir Pherozeshah Mehta out of the council. Jinnah gained great esteem from leading the case for Sir Pherozeshah, himself a noted barrister. It was after his case that Jinnah posted a successful record, becoming well known for his advocacy and legal logic. In 1908, his factional foe in the Indian National Congress, Bal Gangadhar Tilak, was arrested for sedition. Before Tilak unsuccessfully represented himself at trial, he engaged Jinnah in an attempt to secure his release on bail. Jinnah did not succeed, but obtained an acquittal for Tilak when he was charged with sedition again in 1916.

One of Jinnah's fellow barristers from the Bombay High Court remembered that "Jinnah's faith in himself was incredible"; he recalled that on being admonished by a judge with "Mr. Jinnah, remember that you are not addressing a third-class magistrate", Jinnah shot back, "My Lord, allow me to warn you that you are not addressing a third-class pleader." Another of his fellow barristers described him, saying:

He was what God made him, a great pleader. He had a sixth sense: he could see around corners. That is where his talents lay ... he was a very clear thinker ... But he drove his points home—points chosen with exquisite selection—slow delivery, word by word.

=== Trade unionist ===
Jinnah was also a supporter of working class causes and an active trade unionist. He was elected President of All India Postal Staff Union in 1925 whose membership was 70,000. According to All Pakistan Labour Federation's publication Productive Role of Trade Unions and Industrial Relations, being a member of Legislative Assembly, Jinnah pleaded forcefully for rights of workers and struggled for getting a "living wage and fair conditions" for them. He also played an important role in enactment of Trade Union Act of 1926 which gave trade union movement legal cover to organise themselves.

=== Rising leader ===
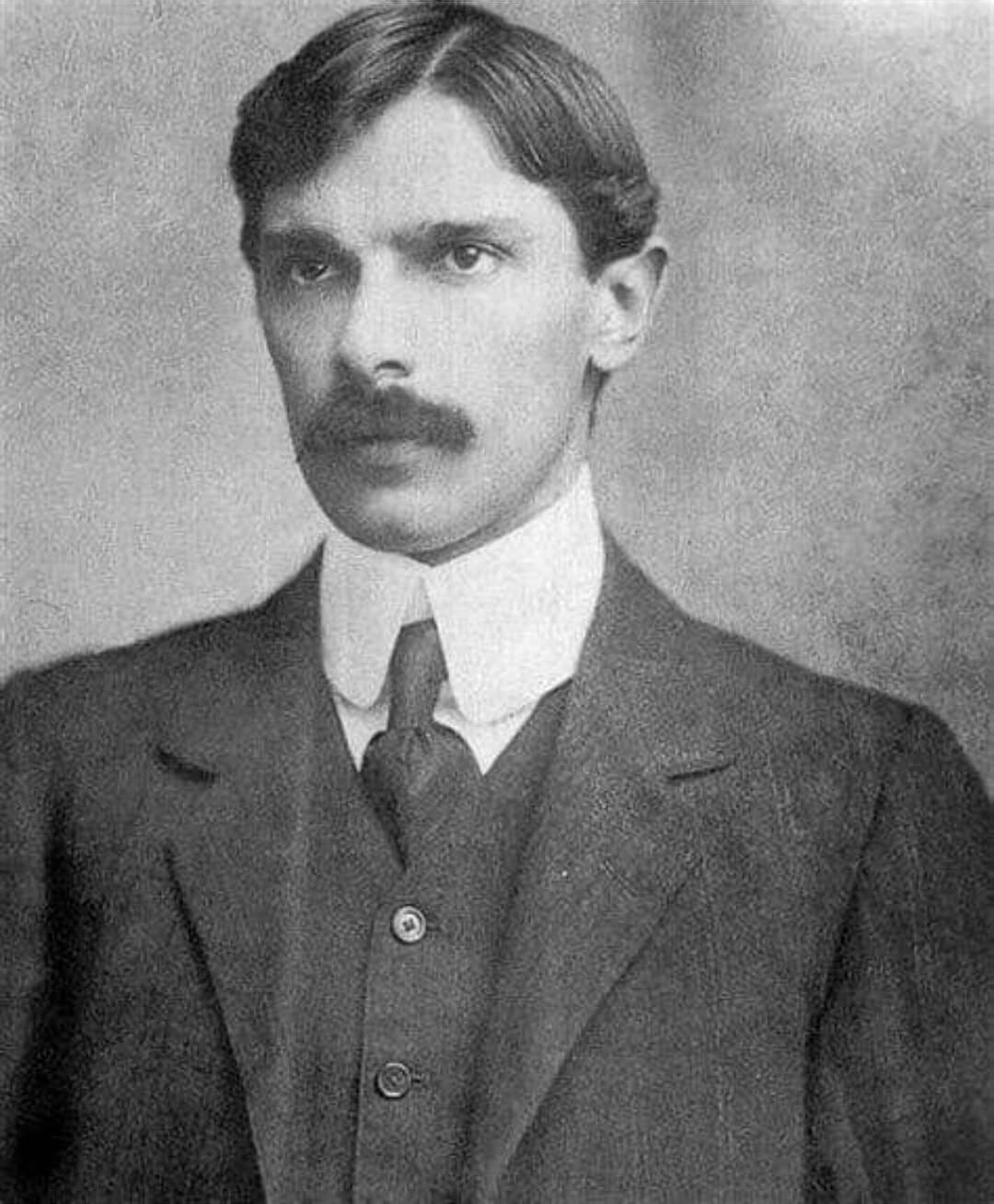
Jinnah in 1910

In 1857, many Indians had risen in revolt against British rule. In the aftermath of the conflict, some Anglo-Indians, as well as Indians in Britain, called for greater self-government for the subcontinent, resulting in the founding of the Indian National Congress in 1885. Most founding members had been educated in Britain, and were content with the minimal reform efforts being made by the government. Muslims were not enthusiastic about calls for democratic institutions in British India, as they constituted a quarter to a third of the population, outnumbered by the Hindus. Early meetings of the Congress contained a minority of Muslims, mostly from the elite.

Jinnah devoted much of his time to his law practice in the early 1900s, but remained politically involved. Jinnah began political life by attending the Congress's twentieth annual meeting, in Bombay in December 1904. He was a member of the moderate group in the Congress, favouring Hindu–Muslim unity in achieving self-government, and following such leaders as Mehta, Naoroji, and Gopal Krishna Gokhale. They were opposed by leaders such as Tilak and Lala Lajpat Rai, who sought quick action towards independence. In 1906, a delegation of Muslim leaders, known as the Simla Delegation, headed by the Aga Khan called on the new Viceroy of India, Lord Minto, to assure him of their loyalty and to ask for assurances that in any political reforms they would be protected from the "unsympathetic [Hindu] majority". Dissatisfied with this, Jinnah wrote a letter to the editor of the newspaper Gujarati, asking what right the members of the delegation had to speak for Indian Muslims, as they were unelected and self-appointed. When many of the same leaders met in Dacca in December of that year to form the All-India Muslim League to advocate for their community's interests, Jinnah was again opposed. The Aga Khan later wrote that it was "freakishly ironic" that Jinnah, who would lead the League to independence, "came out in bitter hostility toward all that I and my friends had done ... He said that our principle of separate electorates was dividing the nation against itself." In its earliest years, however, the League was not influential; Minto refused to consider it as the Muslim community's representative, and it was ineffective in preventing the 1911 repeal of the partition of Bengal, an action seen as a blow to Muslim interests. Jinnah was also appointed to a committee which helped to establish the Indian Military Academy in Dehra Dun.

Although Jinnah initially opposed separate electorates for Muslims, he used this means to gain his first elective office in 1909, as Bombay's Muslim representative on the Imperial Legislative Council. He was a compromise candidate when two older, better-known Muslims who were seeking the post deadlocked. The council, which had been expanded to 60 members as part of reforms enacted by Minto, recommended legislation to the Viceroy. Only officials could vote in the council; non-official members, such as Jinnah, had no vote. Throughout his legal career, Jinnah practised probate law (with many clients from India's nobility), and in 1911 introduced the Wakf Validation Act to place Muslim religious trusts on a sound legal footing under British Indian law. Two years later, the measure passed, the first act sponsored by non-officials to pass the council and be enacted by the Viceroy. Jinnah was also appointed to a committee which helped to establish the Indian Military Academy in Dehra Dun.

In December 1912, Jinnah addressed the annual meeting of the Muslim League although he was not yet a member. He joined the following year, although he remained a member of the Congress as well and stressed that League membership took second priority to the "greater national cause" of an independent India. In April 1913, he again went to Britain, with Gokhale, to meet with officials on behalf of the Congress. Gokhale, a Hindu, later stated that Jinnah "has true stuff in him, and that freedom from all sectarian prejudice which will make him the best ambassador of Hindu–Muslim Unity". Jinnah led another delegation of the Congress to London in 1914, but due to the start of the First World War in August 1914, found officials little interested in Indian reforms. By coincidence, he was in Britain at the same time as a man who would become his great political rival, Mohandas Gandhi, a Hindu lawyer who had become well known for advocating satyagraha, non-violent non-co-operation, while in South Africa. Jinnah attended a reception for Gandhi where the two men met and talked with each other for the first time. Shortly afterwards, Jinnah returned home to India in January 1915.

=== Farewell to Congress ===
Jinnah's moderate faction in the Congress was undermined by the deaths of Mehta and Gokhale in 1915; he was further isolated by the fact that Naoroji was in London, where he remained until his death in 1917. Nevertheless, Jinnah worked to bring the Congress and League together. In 1916, with Jinnah now president of the Muslim League, the two organisations signed the Lucknow Pact, setting quotas for Muslim and Hindu representation in the various provinces. Although the pact was never fully implemented, its signing ushered in a period of co-operation between the Congress and the League. To applaud Jinnah's efforts, Sarojini Naidu described him as an ‘ambassador of Hindu-Muslim unity.' But decades later, the 1946 Calcutta Riots fractured the relationship between the Congress and the Muslim League beyond repair. A few days later, when Wavell invited Sarojini Naidu to dinner, she spoke of Jinnah "rather as of Lucifer … a fallen angel, one who had once promised to be a great leader of Indian freedom but had cast himself out of the Congress heaven."

During the war, Jinnah joined other Indian moderates in supporting the British war effort, hoping that Indians would be rewarded with political freedoms. Jinnah played an important role in the founding of the All India Home Rule League in 1916. Along with political leaders Annie Besant and Tilak, Jinnah demanded "home rule" for India—the status of a self-governing dominion in the Empire similar to Canada, New Zealand and Australia, although, with the war, Britain's politicians were not interested in considering Indian constitutional reform. British Cabinet minister Edwin Montagu recalled Jinnah in his memoirs, "young, perfectly mannered, impressive-looking, armed to the teeth with dialectics, and insistent on the whole of his scheme".

In 1918, Jinnah married his second wife Rattanbai Petit ("Ruttie"), 24 years his junior. She was the fashionable young daughter of his friend Sir Dinshaw Petit, and was part of an elite Parsi family of Bombay. There was great opposition to the marriage from Rattanbai's family and the Parsi community, as well as from some Muslim religious leaders. Rattanbai defied her family and nominally converted to Islam, adopting (though never using) the name Maryam Jinnah, resulting in a permanent estrangement from her family and Parsi society. The couple resided at South Court Mansion in Bombay, and frequently travelled across India and Europe. The couple's only child, daughter Dina, was born on 15 August 1919. The couple separated prior to Ruttie's death in 1929, and subsequently Jinnah's sister Fatima looked after him and his child.

Relations between Indians and British were strained in 1919 when the Imperial Legislative Council extended emergency wartime restrictions on civil liberties; Jinnah resigned from it when it did. There was unrest across India, which worsened after the Jallianwala Bagh massacre in Amritsar, in which British Indian Army troops fired upon a protest meeting, killing hundreds. In the wake of Amritsar, Gandhi, who had returned to India and become a widely respected leader and highly influential in the Congress, called for satyagraha against the British. Gandhi's proposal gained broad Hindu support, and was also attractive to many Muslims of the Khilafat faction. These Muslims, supported by Gandhi, sought retention of the Ottoman caliphate, which supplied spiritual leadership to many Muslims. The caliph was the Ottoman Emperor, who would be deprived of both offices following his nation's defeat in the First World War. Gandhi had achieved considerable popularity among Muslims because of his work during the war on behalf of killed or imprisoned Muslims. Unlike Jinnah and other leaders of the Congress, Gandhi did not wear western-style clothing, did his best to use an Indian language instead of English, and was deeply rooted in Indian culture. Gandhi's local style of leadership gained great popularity with the Indian people. Jinnah criticised Gandhi's Khilafat advocacy, which he saw as an endorsement of religious zealotry. Jinnah regarded Gandhi's proposed satyagraha campaign as political anarchy, and believed that self-government should be secured through constitutional means. He opposed Gandhi, but the tide of Indian opinion was against him. At the 1920 session of the Congress in Nagpur, Jinnah was shouted down by the delegates, who passed Gandhi's proposal, pledging satyagraha until India was independent. Jinnah did not attend the subsequent League meeting, held in the same city, which passed a similar resolution. Because of the action of the Congress in endorsing Gandhi's campaign, Jinnah resigned from it, leaving all positions except in the Muslim League.

== Wilderness years; interlude in England ==
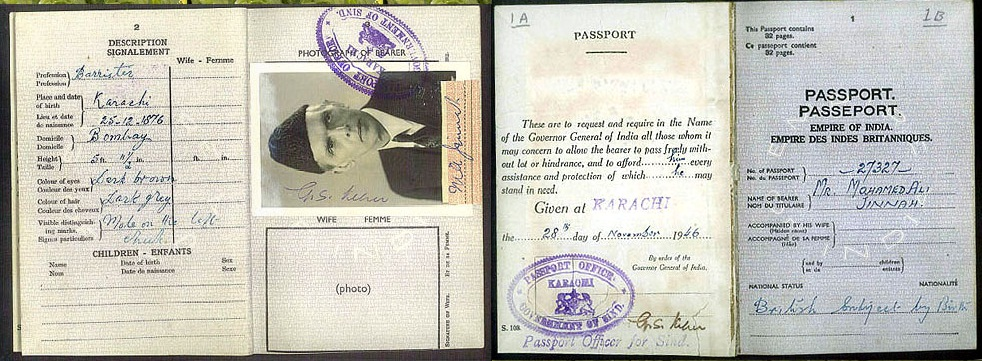
Jinnah's passport

The alliance between Gandhi and the Khilafat faction did not last long, and the campaign of resistance proved less effective than hoped, as India's institutions continued to function. Jinnah sought alternative political ideas, and contemplated organising a new political party as a rival to the Congress. In September 1923, Jinnah was elected as Muslim member for Bombay in the new Central Legislative Assembly. He showed much skill as a parliamentarian, organising many Indian members to work with the Swaraj Party, and continued to press demands for full responsible government. In 1925, as recognition for his legislative activities, he was offered a knighthood by Lord Reading, who was retiring from the Viceroyalty. He replied: "I prefer to be plain Mr Jinnah."

In 1927, the British Government, under Conservative Prime Minister Stanley Baldwin, undertook a decennial review of Indian policy mandated by the Government of India Act 1919. The review began two years early as Baldwin feared he would lose the next election (which he did, in 1929). The Cabinet was influenced by minister Winston Churchill, who strongly opposed self-government for India, and members hoped that by having the commission appointed early, the policies for India which they favoured would survive their government. The resulting commission, led by John Simon, arrived in India in March 1928. They were met with a boycott by India's leaders, Muslim and Hindu alike, angered at the British refusal to include their representatives on the commission. A minority of Muslims, though, withdrew from the League, choosing to welcome the Simon Commission and repudiating Jinnah. Most members of the League's executive council remained loyal to Jinnah, attending the League meeting in December 1927 and January 1928 which confirmed him as the League's permanent president. At that session, Jinnah told the delegates that "A constitutional war has been declared on Great Britain. Negotiations for a settlement are not to come from our side ... By appointing an exclusively white Commission, [Secretary of State for India] Lord Birkenhead has declared our unfitness for self-government."

Birkenhead in 1928 challenged Indians to come up with their own proposal for constitutional change for India; in response, the Congress convened a committee under the leadership of Motilal Nehru. The Nehru Report favoured constituencies based on geography on the ground that being dependent on each other for election would bind the communities closer together. Jinnah, though he believed separate electorates, based on religion, necessary to ensure Muslims had a voice in the government, was willing to compromise on this point, but talks between the two parties failed. He put forth proposals that he hoped might satisfy a broad range of Muslims and reunite the League, calling for mandatory representation for Muslims in legislatures and cabinets. These became known as his Fourteen Points. He could not secure adoption of the Fourteen Points, as the League meeting in Delhi at which he hoped to gain a vote instead dissolved into chaotic argument.

After Baldwin was defeated at the 1929 British parliamentary election, Ramsay MacDonald of the Labour Party became prime minister. MacDonald desired a conference of Indian and British leaders in London to discuss India's future, a course of action supported by Jinnah. Three Round Table Conferences followed over as many years, none of which resulted in a settlement. Jinnah was a delegate to the first two conferences, but was not invited to the last. He remained in Britain for most of the period 1930 through 1934, practising as a barrister before the Privy Council, where he dealt with a number of India-related cases. His biographers disagree over why he remained so long in Britain—Wolpert asserts that had Jinnah been made a Law Lord, he would have stayed for life, and that Jinnah alternatively sought a parliamentary seat. Early biographer Hector Bolitho denied that Jinnah sought to enter the British Parliament, while Jaswant Singh deems Jinnah's time in Britain as a break or sabbatical from the Indian struggle. Bolitho called this period "Jinnah's years of order and contemplation, wedged in between the time of early struggle, and the final storm of conquest".

In 1931, Fatima Jinnah joined her brother in England. From then on, Muhammad Ali Jinnah would receive personal care and support from her as he aged and began to suffer from the lung ailments which would eventually kill him. She lived and travelled with him, and became a close advisor. Muhammad Jinnah's daughter, Dina, was educated in England and India. Jinnah later became estranged from Dina after she decided to marry a Parsi, Neville Wadia from a prominent business family. When Jinnah urged Dina to marry a Muslim, she reminded him that he had married a woman not raised in his faith. Jinnah continued to correspond cordially with his daughter, but their personal relationship was strained, and she did not come to Pakistan in his lifetime, but only for his funeral.

== Return to politics ==
The early 1930s saw a resurgence in Indian Muslim nationalism, which came to a head with the Pakistan Declaration. In 1933, Indian Muslims, especially from the United Provinces, began to urge Jinnah to return and take up again his leadership of the Muslim League, an organisation which had fallen into inactivity. He remained titular president of the League, (Note: Jinnah was permanent president of the League from 1919 to 1930, when the position was abolished. He was also sessional president in 1916, 1920, and from 1924 until his death in 1948. See Jalal, p. 36.) but declined to travel to India to preside over its 1933 session in April, writing that he could not possibly return there until the end of the year.

Among those who met with Jinnah to seek his return was Liaquat Ali Khan, who would be a major political associate of Jinnah in the years to come and the first prime minister of Pakistan. At Jinnah's request, Liaquat discussed the return with a large number of Muslim politicians and confirmed his recommendation to Jinnah. In early 1934, Jinnah relocated to the subcontinent, though he shuttled between London and India on business for the next few years, selling his house in Hampstead and closing his legal practice in Britain.

Muslims of Bombay elected Jinnah, though then absent in London, as their representative to the Central Legislative Assembly in October 1934. The British Parliament's Government of India Act 1935 gave considerable power to India's provinces, with a weak central parliament in New Delhi, which had no authority over such matters as foreign policy, defence, and much of the budget. Full power remained in the hands of the Viceroy, however, who could dissolve legislatures and rule by decree. The League reluctantly accepted the scheme, though expressing reservations about the weak parliament. The Congress was much better prepared for the provincial elections in 1937, and the League failed to win a majority even of the Muslim seats in any of the provinces where members of that faith held a majority. It did win a majority of the Muslim seats in Delhi, but could not form a government anywhere, though it was part of the ruling coalition in Bengal. The Congress and its allies formed the government even in the North-West Frontier Province (N.W.F.P.), where the League won no seats despite the fact that almost all residents were Muslim.

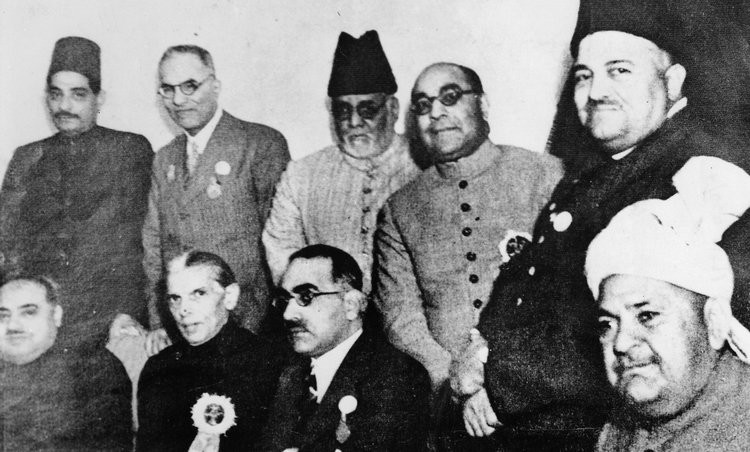
Jinnah (front, left) with the Working Committee of the Muslim League after a meeting in Lucknow, October 1937

According to Jaswant Singh, "the events of 1937 had a tremendous, almost a traumatic effect upon Jinnah". Despite his beliefs of twenty years that Muslims could protect their rights in a united India through separate electorates, provincial boundaries drawn to preserve Muslim majorities, and by other protections of minority rights, Muslim voters had failed to unite, with the issues Jinnah hoped to bring forward lost amid factional fighting. Singh notes the effect of the 1937 elections on Muslim political opinion, "when the Congress formed a government with almost all of the Muslim MLAs sitting on the Opposition benches, non-Congress Muslims were suddenly faced with this stark reality of near-total political powerlessness. It was brought home to them, like a bolt of lightning, that even if the Congress did not win a single Muslim seat ... as long as it won an absolute majority in the House, on the strength of the general seats, it could and would form a government entirely on its own ..."

In the next two years, Jinnah worked to build support among Muslims for the League. He secured the right to speak for the Muslim-led Bengali and Punjabi provincial governments in the central government in New Delhi ("the centre"). He worked to expand the League, reducing the cost of membership to two annas (1/8 of a rupee), half of what it cost to join the Congress. He restructured the League along the lines of the Congress, putting most power in a Working Committee, which he appointed. By December 1939, Liaquat estimated that the League had three million two-anna members.

== Struggle for Pakistan ==
=== Background to independence ===
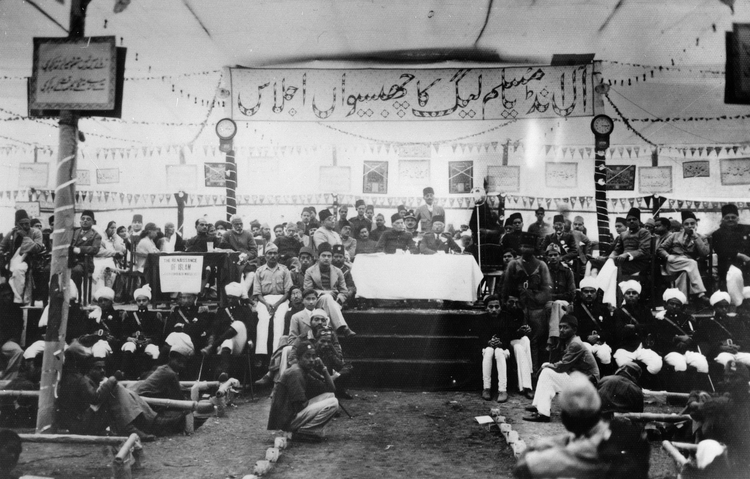
Jinnah addresses the Muslim League session at Patna, 1938

Until the late 1930s, most Muslims of the British Raj expected, upon independence, to be part of a unitary state encompassing all of British India, as did the Hindus and others who advocated self-government. Despite this, other nationalist proposals were being made. In a speech given at Allahabad to a League session in 1930, Sir Muhammad Iqbal called for a state for Muslims in British India. Choudhary Rahmat Ali published a pamphlet in 1933 advocating a state "Pakistan" in the Indus Valley, with other names given to Muslim-majority areas elsewhere in India. Jinnah and Iqbal corresponded in 1936 and 1937; in subsequent years, Jinnah credited Iqbal as his mentor and used Iqbal's imagery and rhetoric in his speeches.

Although many leaders of the Congress sought a strong central government for an Indian state, some Muslim politicians, including Jinnah, were unwilling to accept this without powerful protections for their community. Other Muslims supported the Congress, which officially advocated a secular state upon independence, though the traditionalist wing (including politicians such as Madan Mohan Malaviya and Vallabhbhai Patel) believed that an independent India should enact laws such as banning the slaughter of cows and making Hindi a national language. The failure of the Congress leadership to disavow Hindu communalists worried Congress-supporting Muslims. Nevertheless, the Congress enjoyed considerable Muslim support up to about 1937.

Events which separated the communities included the failed attempt to form a coalition government including the Congress and the League in the United Provinces following the 1937 election. According to historian Ian Talbot, "The provincial Congress governments made no effort to understand and respect their Muslim populations' cultural and religious sensibilities. The Muslim League's claims that it alone could safeguard Muslim interests thus received a major boost. Significantly it was only after this period of Congress rule that it [the League] took up the demand for a Pakistan state ..."

Balraj Puri in his journal article about Jinnah suggests that the Muslim League president, after the 1937 vote, turned to the idea of partition in "sheer desperation". Historian Akbar S. Ahmed suggests that Jinnah abandoned hope of reconciliation with the Congress as he "rediscover[ed] his own Islamic roots, his own sense of identity, of culture and history, which would come increasingly to the fore in the final years of his life". Jinnah also increasingly adopted Muslim dress in the late 1930s. In the wake of the 1937 balloting, Jinnah demanded that the question of power sharing be settled on an all-India basis, and that he, as president of the League, be accepted as the sole spokesman for the Muslim community.

=== Iqbal's influence on Jinnah ===
There is only one way out. Muslims should strengthen Jinnah's hands. They should join the Muslim League. Indian question, as is now being solved, can be countered by our united front against both the Hindus and the English. Without it, our demands are not going to be accepted. People say our demands smack of communalism. This is sheer propaganda. These demands relate to the defence of our national existence.... The united front can be formed under the leadership of the Muslim League. And the Muslim League can succeed only on account of Jinnah. Now none but Jinnah is capable of leading the Muslims.

— Muhammad Iqbal, 1938

The well documented influence of Iqbal on Jinnah, with regard to taking the lead in creating Pakistan, has been described as "significant", "powerful" and even "unquestionable" by scholars. Iqbal has also been cited as an influential force in convincing Jinnah to end his self-imposed exile in London and re-enter the politics of India. Initially, however, Iqbal and Jinnah were opponents, as Iqbal believed Jinnah did not care about the crises confronting the Muslim community during the British Raj. According to Akbar S. Ahmed, this began to change during Iqbal's final years prior to his death in 1938. Iqbal gradually succeeded in converting Jinnah over to his view, who eventually accepted Iqbal as his mentor. Ahmed comments that in his annotations to Iqbal's letters, Jinnah expressed solidarity with Iqbal's view: that Indian Muslims required a separate homeland.

Iqbal's influence also gave Jinnah a deeper appreciation for Muslim identity. The evidence of this influence began to be revealed from 1937 onwards. Jinnah not only began to echo Iqbal in his speeches, he started using Islamic symbolism and began directing his addresses to the underprivileged. Ahmed noted a change in Jinnah's words: while he still advocated freedom of religion and protection of the minorities, the model he was now aspiring to was that of the Prophet Muhammad, rather than that of a secular politician. Ahmed further avers that those scholars who have painted the later Jinnah as secular have misread his speeches which, he argues, must be read in the context of Islamic history and culture. Accordingly, Jinnah's imagery of the Pakistan began to become clear that it was to have an Islamic nature. This change has been seen to last for the rest of Jinnah's life. He continued to borrow ideas "directly from Iqbal—including his thoughts on Muslim unity, on Islamic ideals of liberty, justice and equality, on economics, and even on practices such as prayers".

In a speech in 1940, two years after the death of Iqbal, Jinnah expressed his preference for implementing Iqbal's vision for an Islamic Pakistan even if it meant he himself would never lead a nation. Jinnah stated, "If I live to see the ideal of a Muslim state being achieved in India, and I was then offered to make a choice between the works of Iqbal and the rulership of the Muslim state, I would prefer the former."

=== Second World War and Lahore Resolution ===
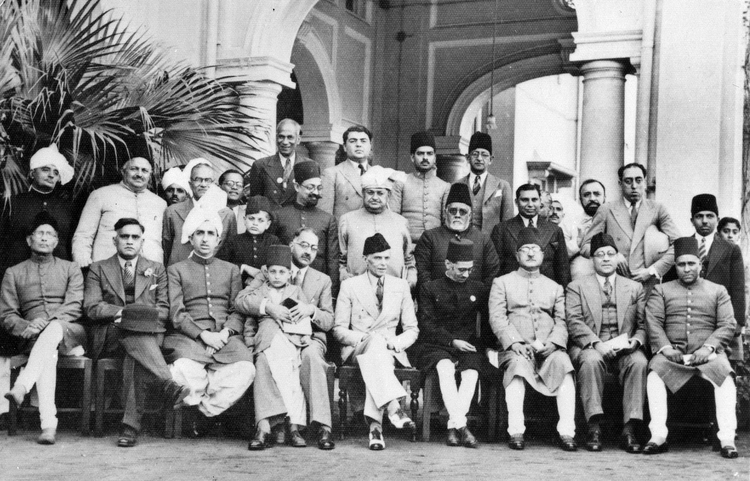
The leaders of the Muslim League, 1940. Jinnah is seated at centre.

On 3 September 1939, British Prime Minister Neville Chamberlain announced the commencement of war with Nazi Germany. The following day, the Viceroy, Lord Linlithgow, without consulting Indian political leaders, announced that India had entered the war along with Britain. There were widespread protests in India. After meeting with Jinnah and with Gandhi, Linlithgow announced that negotiations on self-government were suspended for the duration of the war. The Congress on 14 September demanded immediate independence with a constituent assembly to decide a constitution; when this was refused, its eight provincial governments resigned on 10 November and governors in those provinces thereafter ruled by decree for the remainder of the war. Jinnah, on the other hand, was more willing to accommodate the British, and they in turn increasingly recognised him and the League as the representatives of India's Muslims. Jinnah later stated, "after the war began, ... I was treated on the same basis as Mr Gandhi. I was wonderstruck why I was promoted and given a place side by side with Mr Gandhi." Although the League did not actively support the British war effort, neither did they try to obstruct it.

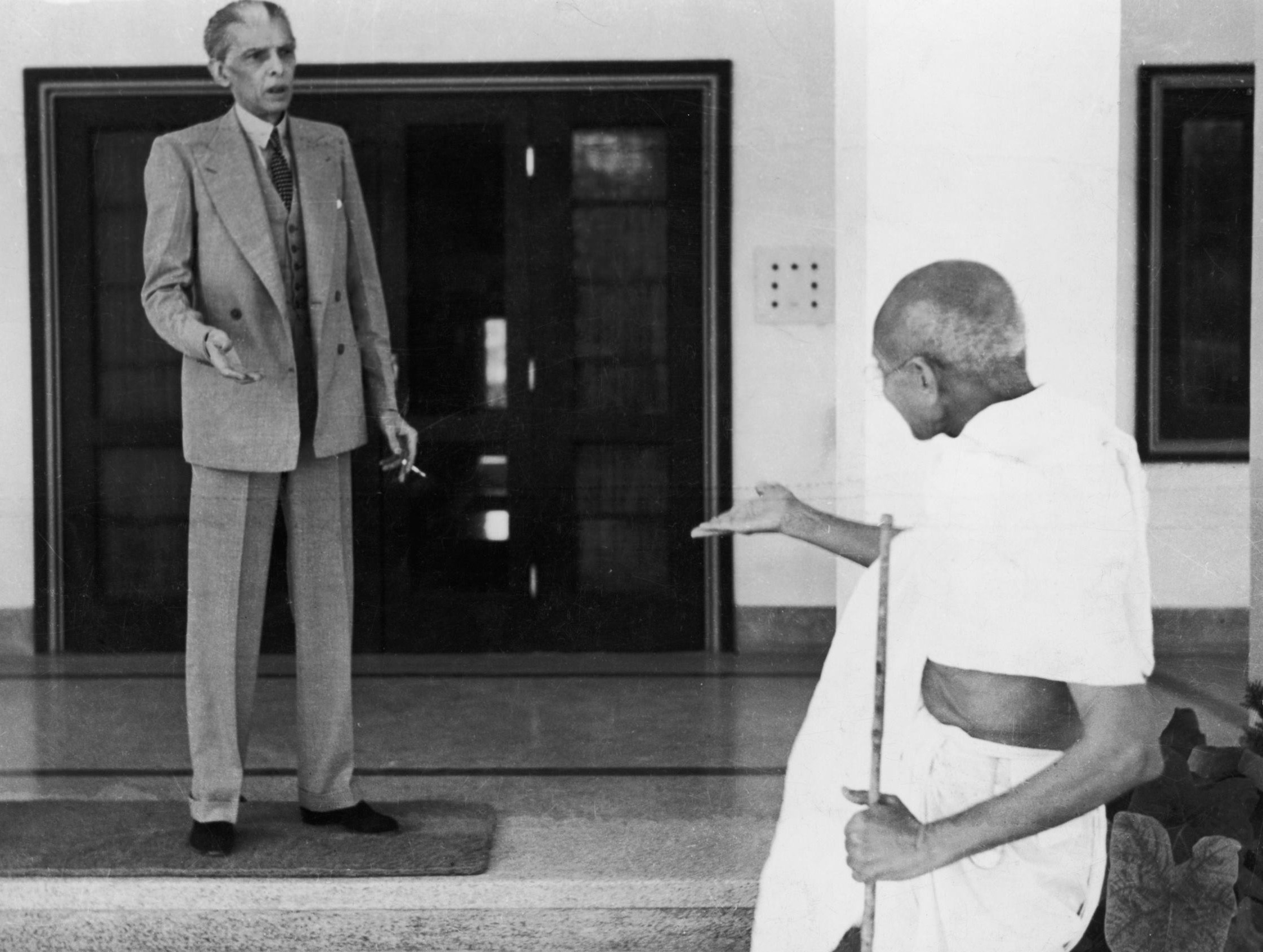
Jinnah and Gandhi arguing after a meeting between them in Delhi, November 1939

With the British and Muslims to some extent co-operating, the Viceroy asked Jinnah for an expression of the Muslim League's position on self-government, confident that it would differ greatly from that of the Congress. To come up with such a position, the League's Working Committee met for four days in February 1940 to set out terms of reference to a constitutional sub-committee. The Working Committee asked that the sub-committee return with a proposal that would result in "independent dominions in direct relationship with Great Britain" where Muslims were dominant. On 6 February, Jinnah informed the Viceroy that the Muslim League would be demanding partition instead of the federation contemplated in the 1935 Act. The Lahore Resolution (sometimes called the "Pakistan Resolution", although it does not contain that name), based on the sub-committee's work, embraced the two-nation theory and called for a union of the Muslim-majority provinces in the northwest of British India, with complete autonomy. Similar rights were to be granted to the Muslim-majority areas in the east, and unspecified protections given to Muslim minorities in other provinces. The resolution was passed by the League session in Lahore on 23 March 1940.

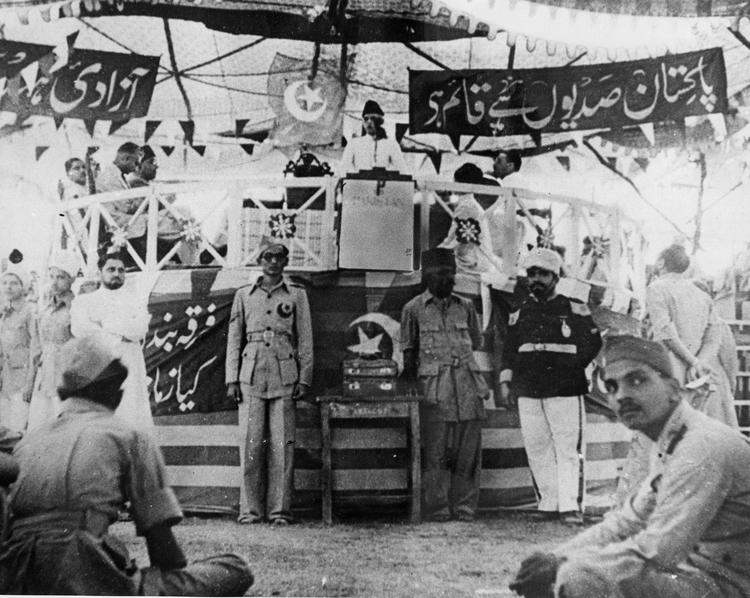
Jinnah makes a speech in New Delhi, 1943

Gandhi's reaction to the Lahore Resolution was muted; he called it "baffling", but told his disciples that Muslims, in common with other people of India, had the right to self-determination. Leaders of the Congress were more vocal; Jawaharlal Nehru referred to Lahore as "Jinnah's fantastic proposals" while Chakravarti Rajagopalachari deemed Jinnah's views on partition "a sign of a diseased mentality". Linlithgow met with Jinnah in June 1940, soon after Winston Churchill became the British prime minister, and in August offered both the Congress and the League a deal whereby in exchange for full support for the war, Linlithgow would allow Indian representation on his major war councils. The Viceroy promised a representative body after the war to determine India's future, and that no future settlement would be imposed over the objections of a large part of the population. This was satisfactory to neither the Congress nor the League, though Jinnah was pleased that the British had moved towards recognising Jinnah as the representative of the Muslim community's interests. Jinnah was reluctant to make specific proposals as to the boundaries of Pakistan, or its relationships with Britain and with the rest of the subcontinent, fearing that any precise plan would divide the League.

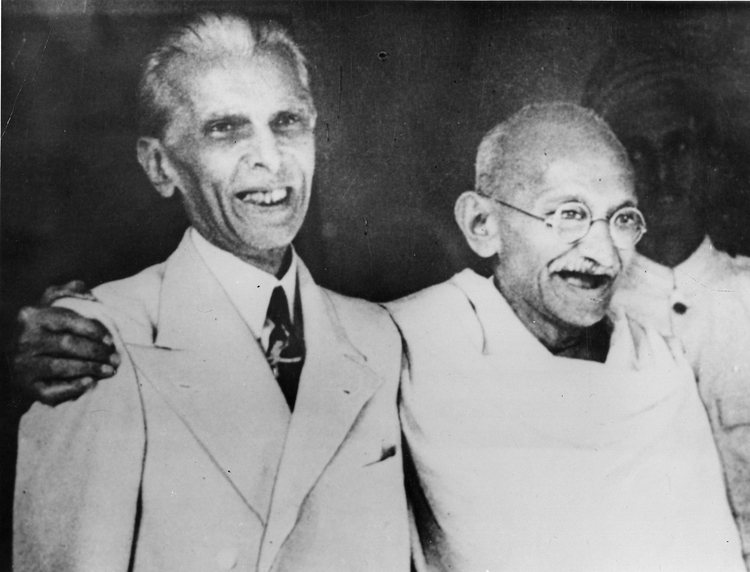
Jinnah with Mahatma Gandhi in Bombay, September 1944

The Japanese attack on Pearl Harbor in December 1941 brought the United States into the war. In the following months, the Japanese advanced in Southeast Asia, and the British Cabinet sent a mission led by Sir Stafford Cripps to try to conciliate the Indians and cause them to fully back the war. Cripps proposed giving some provinces what was dubbed the "local option" to remain outside of an Indian central government either for a period of time or permanently, to become dominions on their own or be part of another confederation. The Muslim League was far from certain of winning the legislative votes that would be required for mixed provinces such as Bengal and Punjab to secede, and Jinnah rejected the proposals as not sufficiently recognising Pakistan's right to exist. The Congress also rejected the Cripps plan, demanding immediate concessions which Cripps was not prepared to give. Despite the rejection, Jinnah and the League saw the Cripps proposal as recognising Pakistan in principle.

The Congress followed the failed Cripps mission by demanding, in August 1942, that the British immediately "Quit India", proclaiming a mass campaign of satyagraha until they did. The British promptly arrested most major leaders of the Congress and imprisoned them for the remainder of the war. Gandhi, however, was placed on house arrest in one of the Aga Khan's palaces prior to his release for health reasons in 1944. With the Congress leaders absent from the political scene, Jinnah warned against the threat of Hindu domination and maintained his Pakistan demand without going into great detail about what that would entail. Jinnah also worked to increase the League's political control at the provincial level. He helped to found the newspaper Dawn in the early 1940s in Delhi; it helped to spread the League's message and eventually became the major English-language newspaper of Pakistan. He also started living in Delhi on Aurangzeb Road (now Dr. A.P.J. Abdul Kalam Road), near Birla House where Mahatma Gandhi stayed and Jinnah was neighbours with the wealthiest man in Delhi at the time, Sir Sobha Singh. His house is now the Embassy of Netherlands in India and is known as Jinnah House by most.

In September 1944, Jinnah hosted Gandhi, recently released from confinement, at his home on Malabar Hill in Bombay. Two weeks of talks between them followed, which resulted in no agreement. Jinnah insisted on Pakistan being conceded prior to the British departure and to come into being immediately, while Gandhi proposed that plebiscites on partition occur sometime after a united India gained its independence. In early 1945, Liaquat and the Congress leader Bhulabhai Desai met, with Jinnah's approval, and agreed that after the war, the Congress and the League should form an interim government with the members of the Executive Council of the Viceroy to be nominated by the Congress and the League in equal numbers. When the Congress leadership were released from prison in June 1945, they repudiated the agreement and censured Desai for acting without proper authority.

=== Postwar ===
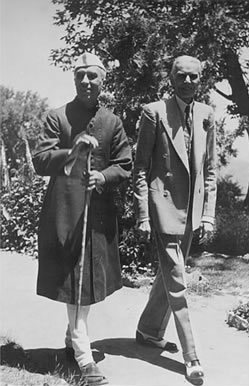
Nehru (left) and Jinnah walk together at Simla, 1946

Field Marshal Viscount Wavell succeeded Linlithgow as Viceroy in 1943. In June 1945, following the release of the Congress leaders, Wavell called for a conference, and invited the leading figures from the various communities to meet with him at Simla. He proposed a temporary government along the lines which Liaquat and Desai had agreed. However, Wavell was unwilling to guarantee that only the League's candidates would be placed in the seats reserved for Muslims. All other invited groups submitted lists of candidates to the Viceroy. Wavell cut the conference short in mid-July without further seeking an agreement; with a British general election imminent, Churchill's government did not feel it could proceed.

British voters returned Clement Attlee and his Labour Party to government later in July. Attlee and his Secretary of State for India, Lord Frederick Pethick-Lawrence, immediately ordered a review of the Indian situation. Jinnah had no comment on the change of government, but called a meeting of his Working Committee and issued a statement calling for new elections in India. The League held influence at the provincial level in the Muslim-majority states mostly by alliance, and Jinnah believed that, given the opportunity, the League would improve its electoral standing and lend added support to his claim to be the sole spokesman for the Muslims. Wavell returned to India in September after consultation with his new masters in London; elections, both for the centre and for the provinces, were announced soon after. The British indicated that formation of a constitution-making body would follow the votes.

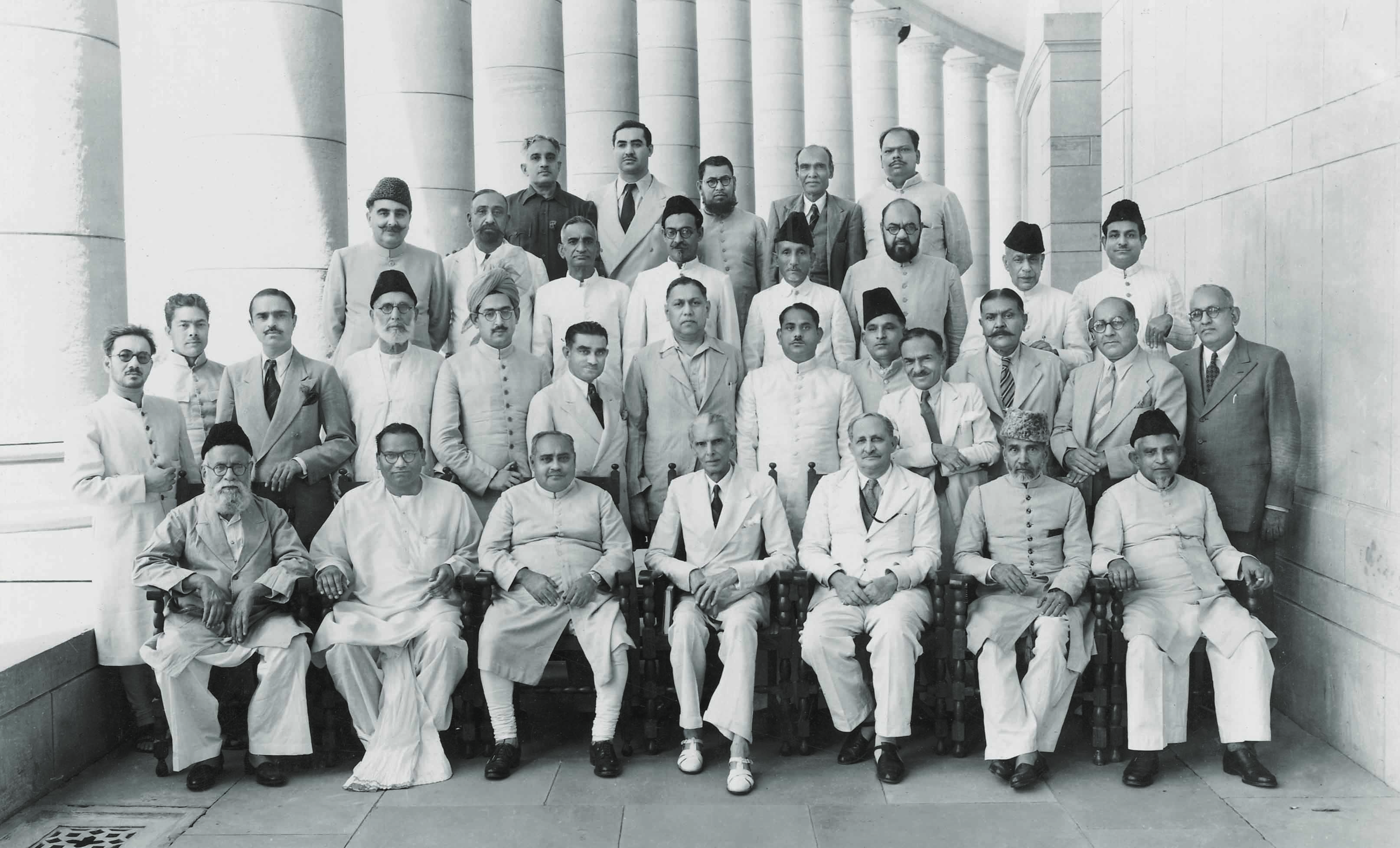
Jinnah with Muslim League leaders in the corridor of the Central Legislative Assembly in New Delhi in 1946.

The Muslim League declared that they would campaign on a single issue: Pakistan. Speaking in Ahmedabad, Jinnah echoed this, "Pakistan is a matter of life or death for us." In the December 1945 elections for the Constituent Assembly of India, the League won every seat reserved for Muslims. In the provincial elections in January 1946, the League took 75% of the Muslim vote, an increase from 4.4% in 1937. According to his biographer Bolitho, "This was Jinnah's glorious hour: his arduous political campaigns, his robust beliefs and claims, were at last justified." Wolpert wrote that the League election showing "appeared to prove the universal appeal of Pakistan among Muslims of the subcontinent". The Congress dominated the central assembly nevertheless, though it lost four seats from its previous strength.

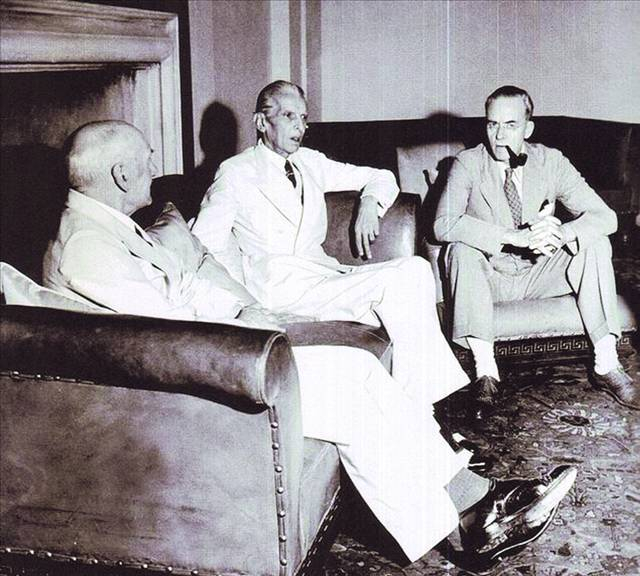
Jinnah with Stafford Cripps (right) and Pethick-Lawrence (left)

In February 1946, the British Cabinet resolved to send a delegation to India to negotiate with leaders there. This Cabinet Mission included Cripps and Pethick-Lawrence. The highest-level delegation to try to break the deadlock, it arrived in New Delhi in late March. Little negotiation had been done since the previous October because of the elections in India. The British in May released a plan for a united Indian state comprising substantially autonomous provinces, and called for "groups" of provinces formed on the basis of religion. Matters such as defence, external relations and communications would be handled by a central authority. Provinces would have the option of leaving the union entirely, and there would be an interim government with representation from the Congress and the League. Jinnah and his Working Committee accepted this plan in June, but it fell apart over the question of how many members of the interim government the Congress and the League would have, and over the Congress's desire to include a Muslim member in its representation. Before leaving India, the British ministers stated that they intended to inaugurate an interim government even if one of the major groups was unwilling to participate.

The Congress soon joined the new Indian ministry. The League was slower to do so, not entering until October 1946. In agreeing to have the League join the government, Jinnah abandoned his demands for parity with the Congress and a veto on matters concerning Muslims. The new ministry met amid a backdrop of rioting, especially in Calcutta. The Congress wanted the Viceroy to immediately summon the constituent assembly and begin the work of writing a constitution and felt that the League ministers should either join in the request or resign from the government. Wavell attempted to save the situation by flying leaders such as Jinnah, Liaquat, and Jawaharlal Nehru to London in December 1946. At the end of the talks, participants issued a statement that the constitution would not be forced on any unwilling parts of India. On the way back from London, Jinnah and Liaquat stopped in Cairo for several days of pan-Islamic meetings.

The Congress endorsed the joint statement from the London conference over the angry dissent from some elements. The League refused to do so, and took no part in the constitutional discussions. Jinnah had been willing to consider some continued links to Hindustan (as the Hindu-majority state which would be formed on partition was sometimes referred to), such as a joint military or communications. However, by December 1946, he insisted on a fully sovereign Pakistan with dominion status.

Following the failure of the London trip, Jinnah was in no hurry to reach an agreement, considering that time would allow him to gain the undivided provinces of Bengal and Punjab for Pakistan, but these wealthy, populous provinces had sizeable non-Muslim minorities, complicating a settlement. The Attlee ministry desired a rapid British departure from the subcontinent, but had little confidence in Wavell to achieve that end. Beginning in December 1946, British officials began looking for a viceregal successor to Wavell, and soon fixed on Admiral Lord Mountbatten of Burma, a war leader popular among Conservatives as the great-grandson of Queen Victoria and among Labour for his political views.

=== Mountbatten and independence ===
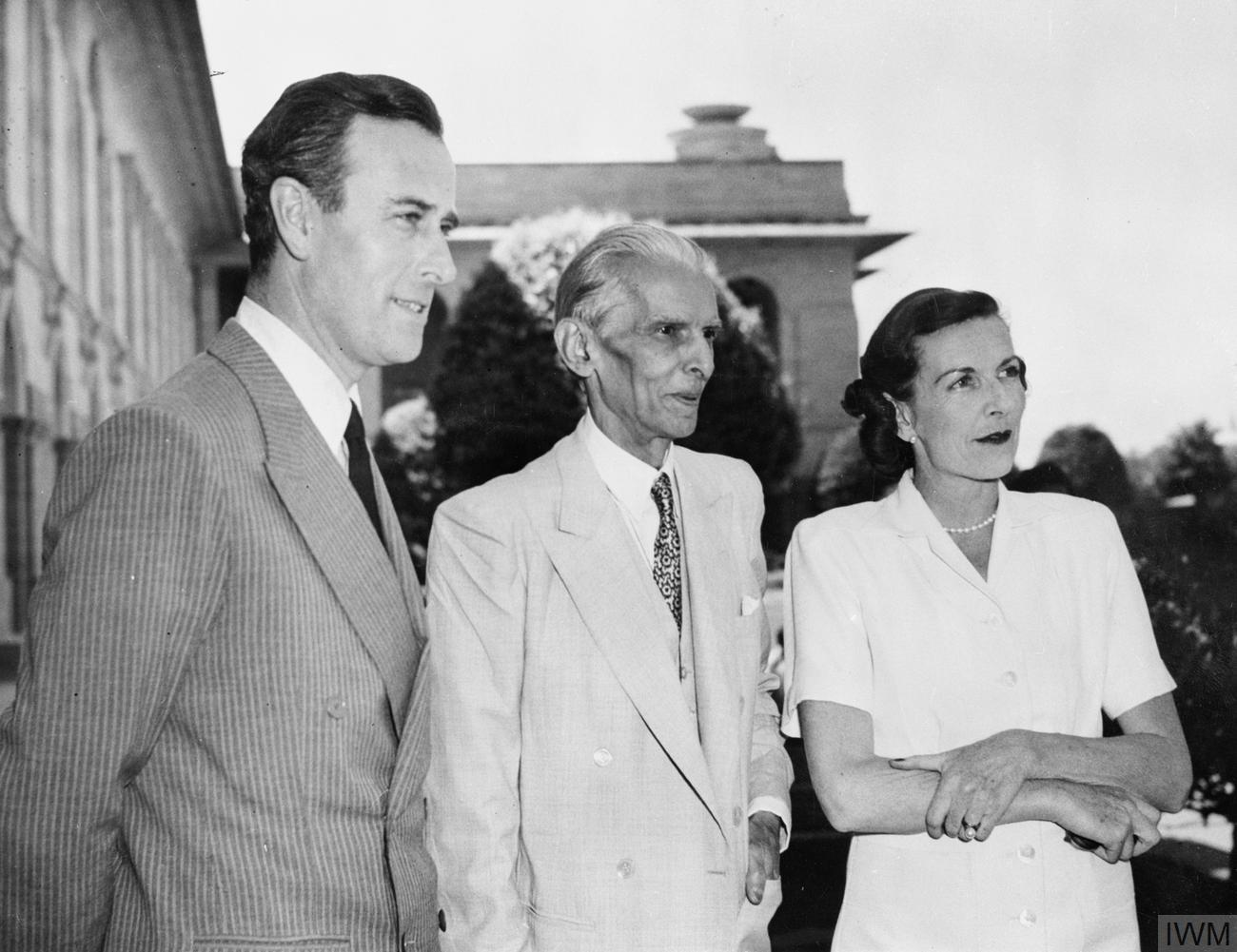
Lord Louis Mountbatten and his wife Edwina Mountbatten with Jinnah in 1947

On 20 February 1947, Attlee announced Mountbatten's appointment, and that Britain would transfer power in India not later than June 1948. Mountbatten took office as Viceroy on 24 March 1947, two days after his arrival in India. By then, the Congress had come around to the idea of partition. Nehru stated in 1960, "the truth is that we were tired men and we were getting on in years ... The plan for partition offered a way out and we took it." Leaders of the Congress decided that having loosely tied Muslim-majority provinces as part of a future India was not worth the loss of the powerful government at the centre which they desired. However, the Congress insisted that if Pakistan were to become independent, Bengal and Punjab would have to be divided.

Mountbatten had been warned in his briefing papers that Jinnah would be his "toughest customer" who had proved a chronic nuisance because "no one in this country [India] had so far gotten into Jinnah's mind". The men met over six days beginning on 5 April. The sessions began lightly when Jinnah, photographed between Louis and Edwina Mountbatten, quipped "A rose between two thorns" which the Viceroy took, perhaps gratuitously, as evidence that the Muslim leader had pre-planned his joke but had expected the vicereine to stand in the middle. Mountbatten was not favourably impressed with Jinnah, repeatedly expressing frustration to his staff about Jinnah's insistence on Pakistan in the face of all argument.

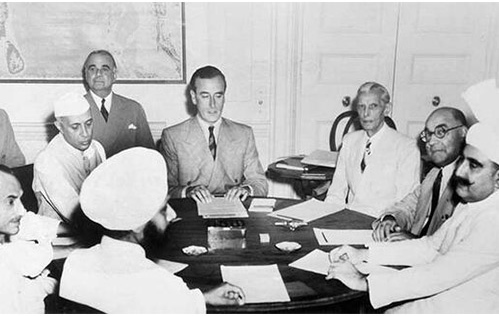
Mountbatten meets Jinnah, Nehru and other leaders to plan the Partition of India

Jinnah feared that at the end of the British presence in the subcontinent, they would turn control over to the Congress-dominated constituent assembly, putting Muslims at a disadvantage in attempting to win autonomy. He demanded that Mountbatten divide the army prior to independence, which would take at least a year. Mountbatten had hoped that the post-independence arrangements would include a common defence force, but Jinnah saw it as essential that a sovereign state should have its own forces. Mountbatten met with Liaquat the day of his final session with Jinnah, and concluded, as he told Attlee and the Cabinet in May, that "it had become clear that the Muslim League would resort to arms if Pakistan in some form were not conceded." The Viceroy was also influenced by negative Muslim reaction to the constitutional report of the assembly, which envisioned broad powers for the post-independence central government.

On 2 June 1947, the final plan was given by the Viceroy to Indian leaders: on 15 August, the British would turn over power to two dominions. The provinces would vote on whether to continue in the existing constituent assembly or to have a new one, that is, to join Pakistan. Bengal and Punjab would also vote, both on the question of which assembly to join, and on the partition. A boundary commission would determine the final lines in the partitioned provinces. Plebiscites would take place in the North-West Frontier Province (which did not have a League government despite an overwhelmingly Muslim population), and in the majority-Muslim Sylhet district of Assam, adjacent to eastern Bengal. On 3 June, Mountbatten, Nehru, Jinnah and Sikh leader Baldev Singh made the formal announcement by radio. Jinnah concluded his address with "Pakistan Zindabad" (Long live Pakistan), which was not in the script. Some listeners misunderstood his Urdu as "Pakistan's in the bag!". In the weeks which followed Punjab and Bengal cast the votes which resulted in partition. Sylhet and the N.W.F.P. voted to cast their lots with Pakistan, a decision joined by the assemblies in Sind and Baluchistan.

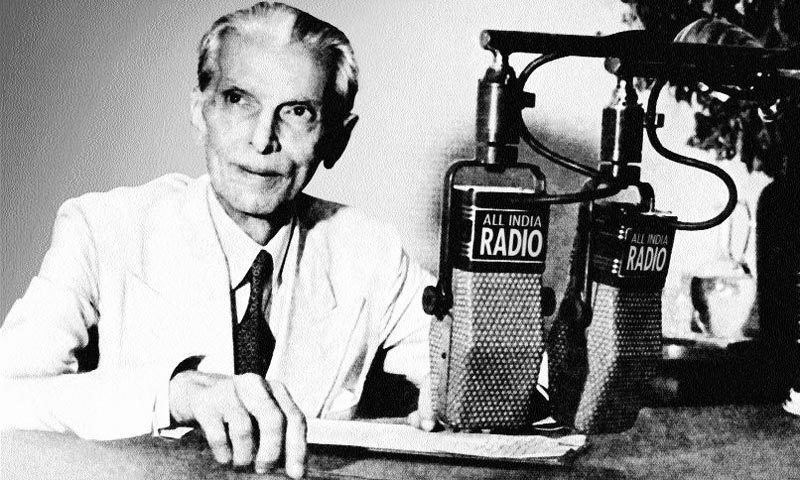
Jinnah announcing the creation of Pakistan over All India Radio on 3 June 1947

On 4 July 1947, Liaquat asked Mountbatten on Jinnah's behalf to recommend to the British king, George VI, that Jinnah be appointed Pakistan's first governor-general. This request angered Mountbatten, who had hoped to have that position in both dominions—he would be India's first post-independence governor-general—but Jinnah felt that Mountbatten would be likely to favour the new Hindu-majority state because of his closeness to Nehru. In addition, the governor-general would initially be a powerful figure, and Jinnah did not trust anyone else to take that office. Although the Boundary Commission, led by British lawyer Sir Cyril Radcliffe, had not yet reported, there were already massive movements of populations between the nations-to-be, as well as sectarian violence. Jinnah arranged to sell his house in Bombay and procured a new one in Karachi. On 7 August, Jinnah, with his sister and close staff, flew from Delhi to Karachi in Mountbatten's plane, and as the plane taxied, he was heard to murmur, "That's the end of that." On 11 August, he presided over the new constituent assembly for Pakistan at Karachi, and addressed them, "You are free; you are free to go to your temples, you are free to go to your mosques or to any other place of worship in this State of Pakistan ... You may belong to any religion or caste or creed—that has nothing to do with the business of the State ... I think we should keep that in front of us as our ideal and you will find that in course of time Hindus would cease to be Hindus and Muslims would cease to be Muslims, not in the religious sense, because that is the personal faith of each individual, but in the political sense as citizens of the State." On 14 August, Pakistan became independent; Jinnah led the celebrations in Karachi. One observer wrote, "here indeed is Pakistan's King Emperor, Archbishop of Canterbury, Speaker and Prime Minister concentrated into one formidable Quaid-e-Azam."

== Governor-General of Pakistan ==
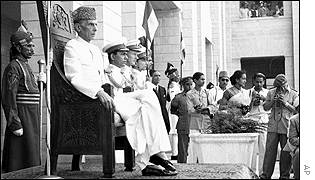
Jinnah during the oath taking ceremony as Governor General

The Radcliffe Commission, dividing Bengal and Punjab, completed its work and reported to Mountbatten on 12 August; the last Viceroy held the maps until the 17th, not wanting to spoil the independence celebrations in both nations. There had already been ethnically charged violence and movement of populations; publication of the Radcliffe Line dividing the new nations sparked mass migration, murder, and ethnic cleansing. Many on the "wrong side" of the lines fled or were murdered, or murdered others, hoping to make facts on the ground which would reverse the commission's verdict. Radcliffe wrote in his report that he knew that neither side would be happy with his award; he declined his fee for the work. Christopher Beaumont, Radcliffe's private secretary, later wrote that Mountbatten "must take the blame—though not the sole blame—for the massacres in the Punjab in which between 500,000 to a million men, women and children perished". Jinnah did what he could for the eight million people who migrated to Pakistan; although by now over 70 and frail from lung ailments, he travelled across West Pakistan and personally supervised the provision of aid. According to Ahmed, "What Pakistan needed desperately in those early months was a symbol of the state, one that would unify people and give them the courage and resolve to succeed."

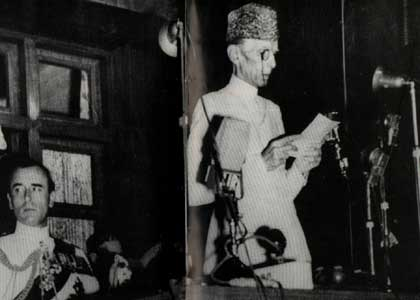
Jinnah speaking at the Constituent Assembly of Pakistan on 14 August 1947

Among the restive regions of the new nation was the North-West Frontier Province. The referendum there in July 1947 had been tainted by low turnout as less than 10 per cent of the population were allowed to vote. On 22 August 1947, just after a week of becoming governor general, Jinnah dissolved the elected government of Khan Abdul Jabbar Khan. Later on, Abdul Qayyum Khan was put in place by Jinnah in the Pashtun-dominated province despite him being a Kashmiri. On 12 August 1948, the Babrra massacre in Charsadda occurred, resulting in the death of 400 people aligned with the Khudai Khidmatgar movement.

Along with Liaquat and Abdur Rab Nishtar, Jinnah represented Pakistan's interests in the Division Council to appropriately divide public assets between India and Pakistan. Pakistan was supposed to receive one-sixth of the assets of the government before independence, carefully divided by agreement, even specifying how many sheets of paper each side would receive. The new Indian state, however, was slow to deliver, hoping for the collapse of the nascent Pakistani government, and reunion. Few members of the Indian Civil Service and the Indian Police Service had chosen Pakistan, resulting in staff shortages. Partition meant that for some farmers, the markets to sell their crops were on the other side of an international border. There were shortages of machinery, not all of which was made in Pakistan. In addition to the massive refugee problem, the new government sought to save abandoned crops, establish security in a chaotic situation, and provide basic services. According to economist Yasmeen Niaz Mohiuddin in her study of Pakistan, "although Pakistan was born in bloodshed and turmoil, it survived in the initial and difficult months after partition only because of the tremendous sacrifices made by its people and the selfless efforts of its great leader."

The princely states of India were advised by the departing British to choose whether to join Pakistan or India. Most did so prior to independence, but the holdouts contributed to what have become lasting divisions between the two nations. Indian leaders were angered at Jinnah's attempts to convince the princes of Jodhpur, Udaipur, Bhopal and Indore to accede to Pakistan—the latter three princely states did not border Pakistan. Jodhpur bordered it and had both a Hindu majority population and a Hindu ruler. The coastal princely state of Junagadh, which had a majority Hindu population, did accede to Pakistan in September 1947, with its ruler's dewan, Sir Shah Nawaz Bhutto, personally delivering the accession papers to Jinnah. But two of three vassal states that were subject to the suzerainty of Junagadh—Mangrol and Babariawad—declared their independence from Junagadh and acceded to India. In response, the Nawab of Junagarh militarily occupied the two states. Subsequently, the Indian Army occupied the principality in November, forcing its former leaders, including Bhutto, to flee to Pakistan, beginning the politically influential Bhutto family.

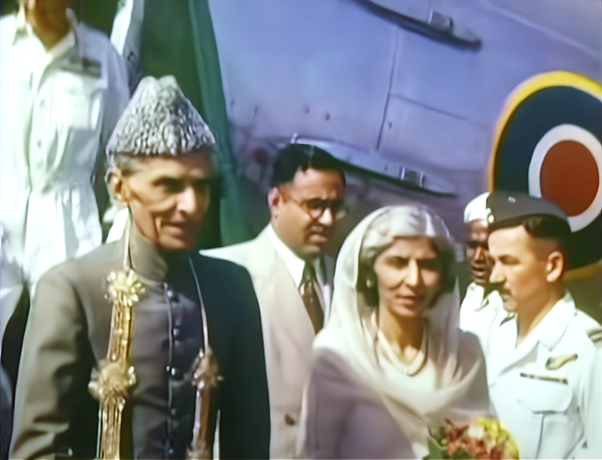
Jinnah, accompanied by his sister Fatima Jinnah, arrived in Lahore in 1948 to discuss the Kashmir crisis

The most contentious of the disputes was, and continues to be, that over the princely state of Kashmir. It had a Muslim-majority population and a Hindu maharaja, Sir Hari Singh, who stalled his decision on which nation to join. With the population in revolt in October 1947, aided by Pakistani irregulars, the maharaja acceded to India; Indian troops were airlifted in. Jinnah objected to this action, and ordered that Pakistani troops move into Kashmir. The Pakistani Army was still commanded by British officers, and the commanding officer, General Sir Douglas Gracey, refused the order, stating that he would not move into what he considered the territory of another nation without approval from higher authority, which was not forthcoming. Jinnah withdrew the order. This did not stop the violence there, which broke into the First Kashmir War.

Some historians allege that Jinnah's courting the rulers of Hindu-majority states and his gambit with Junagadh are evidence of ill-intent towards India, as Jinnah had promoted separation by religion, yet tried to gain the accession of Hindu-majority states. In his book Patel: A Life, Rajmohan Gandhi asserts that Jinnah hoped for a plebiscite in Junagadh, knowing Pakistan would lose, in the hope the principle would be established for Kashmir. However, when Mountbatten proposed to Jinnah that, in all the princely States where the ruler did not accede to a Dominion corresponding to the majority population (which would have included Junagadh, Hyderabad and Kashmir), the accession should be decided by an 'impartial reference to the will of the people', Jinnah rejected the offer.

In February 1948, in a radio talk broadcast addressed to the people of the US, Jinnah expressed his views regarding Pakistan's constitution to be in the following way:

The Constitution of Pakistan is yet to be framed by the Pakistan Constituent Assembly, I do not know what the ultimate shape of the constitution is going to be, but I am sure that it will be of a democratic type, embodying the essential principles of Islam. Today these are as applicable in actual life as these were 1300 years ago. Islam and its idealism have taught us democracy. It has taught equality of man, justice and fair play to everybody. We are the inheritors of these glorious traditions and are fully alive to our responsibilities and obligations as framers of the future constitution of Pakistan.

In March, Jinnah, despite his declining health, made his only post-independence visit to East Bengal, the eastern wing of Pakistan. In a speech before a crowd estimated at 300,000, Jinnah stated (in English) that Urdu alone should be the national language, believing a single language was needed for a nation to remain united. The Bengali-speaking people of East Pakistan strongly opposed this policy, and in 1971, the official language issue was one of several factors in the secession of the region to form Bangladesh.

== Illness and death ==
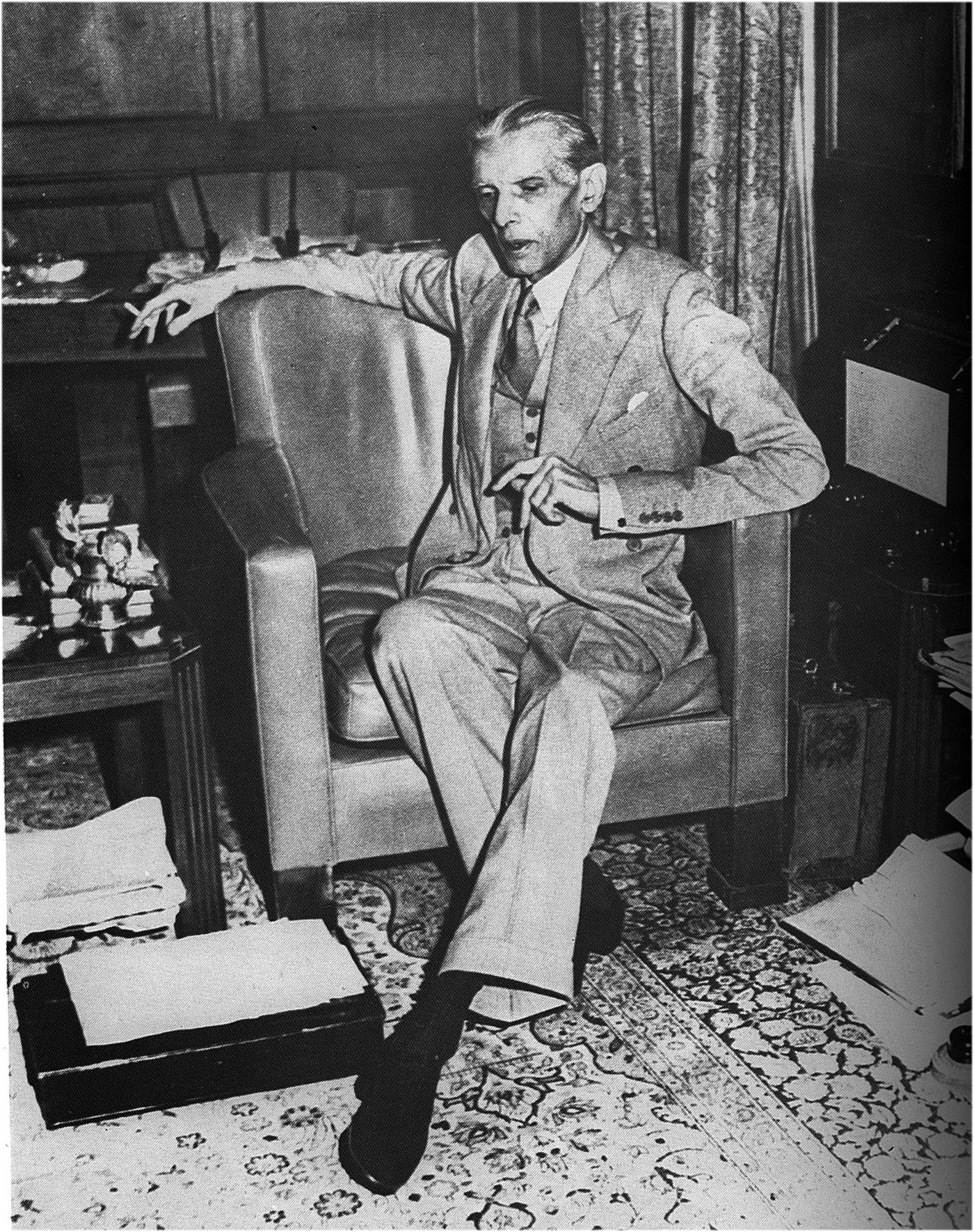
Jinnah smoking a cigarette

From the 1930s, Jinnah suffered from tuberculosis; only his sister and a few others close to him were aware of his condition. Jinnah believed public knowledge of his lung ailments would hurt him politically. In a 1938 letter, he wrote to a supporter that "you must have read in the papers how during my tours ... I suffered, which was not because there was anything wrong with me, but the irregularities [of the schedule] and over-strain told upon my health". Many years later, Mountbatten stated that if he had known Jinnah was so physically ill, he would have stalled, hoping Jinnah's death would avert partition. Fatima Jinnah later wrote, "even in his hour of triumph, the Quaid-e-Azam was gravely ill ... He worked in a frenzy to consolidate Pakistan. And, of course, he totally neglected his health ..." Jinnah was a heavy smoker who worked with a tin of Craven "A" cigarettes at his desk, of which he had smoked 50 or more a day for the previous 30 years, as well as a box of Cuban cigars. As his health got worse, he took longer and longer rest breaks in the private wing of Government House in Karachi, where only he, Fatima and the servants were allowed. In June 1948, he and Fatima flew to Quetta, in the mountains of Balochistan, where the weather was cooler than in Karachi. He could not completely rest there, addressing the officers at the Command and Staff College saying, "you, along with the other Forces of Pakistan, are the custodians of the life, property and honour of the people of Pakistan." He returned to Karachi for the 1 July opening ceremony for the State Bank of Pakistan, at which he spoke. A reception by the Canadian trade commissioner that evening in honour of Canada's Dominion Day was the last public event he attended.

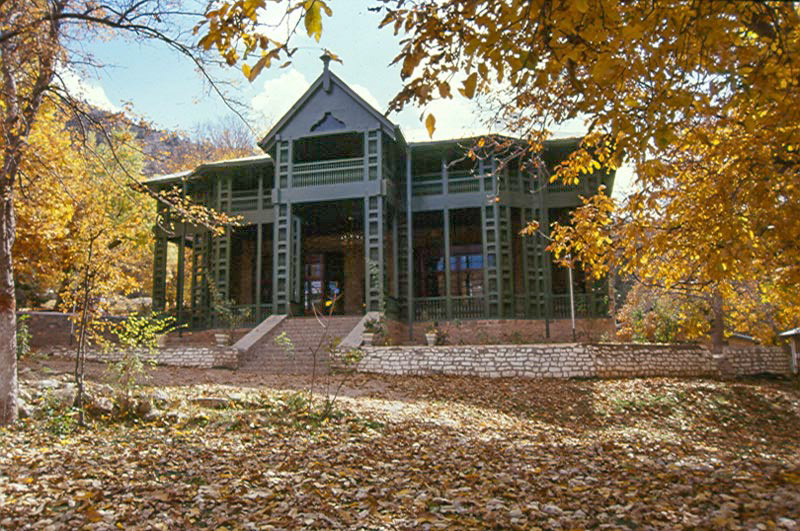
Jinnah spent many of the last days of his life at Quaid-e-Azam Residency, Ziarat, Pakistan.

On 6 July 1948, Jinnah returned to Quetta, but at the advice of doctors, soon journeyed to an even higher retreat at Ziarat. Jinnah had always been reluctant to undergo medical treatment but realising his condition was getting worse, the Pakistani government sent the best doctors it could find to treat him. Tests confirmed tuberculosis, and also showed evidence of advanced lung cancer. He was treated with the new "miracle drug" of streptomycin, but it did not help. Jinnah's condition continued to deteriorate despite the Eid prayers of his people. He was moved to the lower altitude of Quetta on 13 August, the eve of Independence Day, for which a ghost-written statement for him was released. Despite an increase in appetite (he then weighed just over 36 kilograms or 79 pounds), it was clear to his doctors that if he was to return to Karachi in life, he would have to do so very soon. Jinnah, however, was reluctant to go, not wishing his aides to see him as an invalid on a stretcher. By 9 September, Jinnah had also developed pneumonia. Doctors urged him to return to Karachi, where he could receive better care, and with his agreement, he was flown there on the morning of 11 September. Dr Ilahi Bux, his personal physician, believed that Jinnah's change of mind was caused by foreknowledge of death. The plane landed at Karachi that afternoon, to be met by Jinnah's limousine, and an ambulance into which Jinnah's stretcher was placed. The ambulance broke down on the road into town, and the Governor-General and those with him waited for another to arrive; he could not be placed in the car as he could not sit up. They waited by the roadside in oppressive heat as trucks and buses passed by, unsuitable for transporting the dying man and with their occupants not knowing of Jinnah's presence. After an hour, the replacement ambulance came, and transported Jinnah to Government House, arriving there over two hours after the landing. Jinnah died later that night at 10:20 pm at his home in Karachi on 11 September 1948 at the age of 71, just over a year after Pakistan's creation.

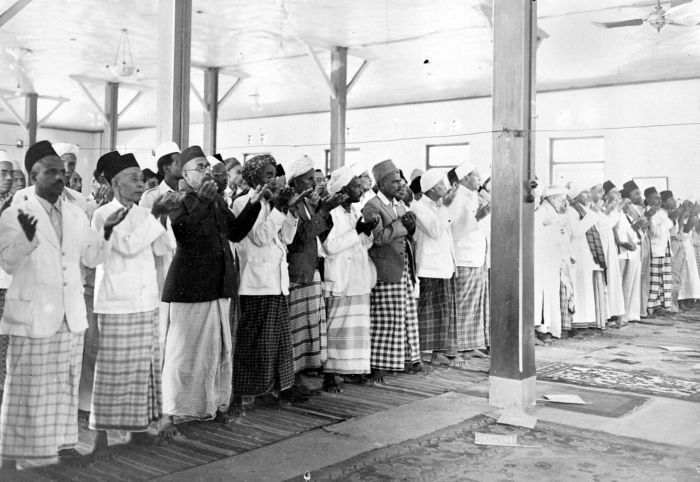
Special services and prayers were held in the Kwitang mosque of Jakarta (Indonesia) after the death of Jinnah.

Indian prime minister Jawaharlal Nehru stated upon Jinnah's death, "How shall we judge him? I have been very angry with him often during the past years. But now there is no bitterness in my thought of him, only a great sadness for all that has been ... he succeeded in his quest and gained his objective, but at what a cost and with what a difference from what he had imagined."

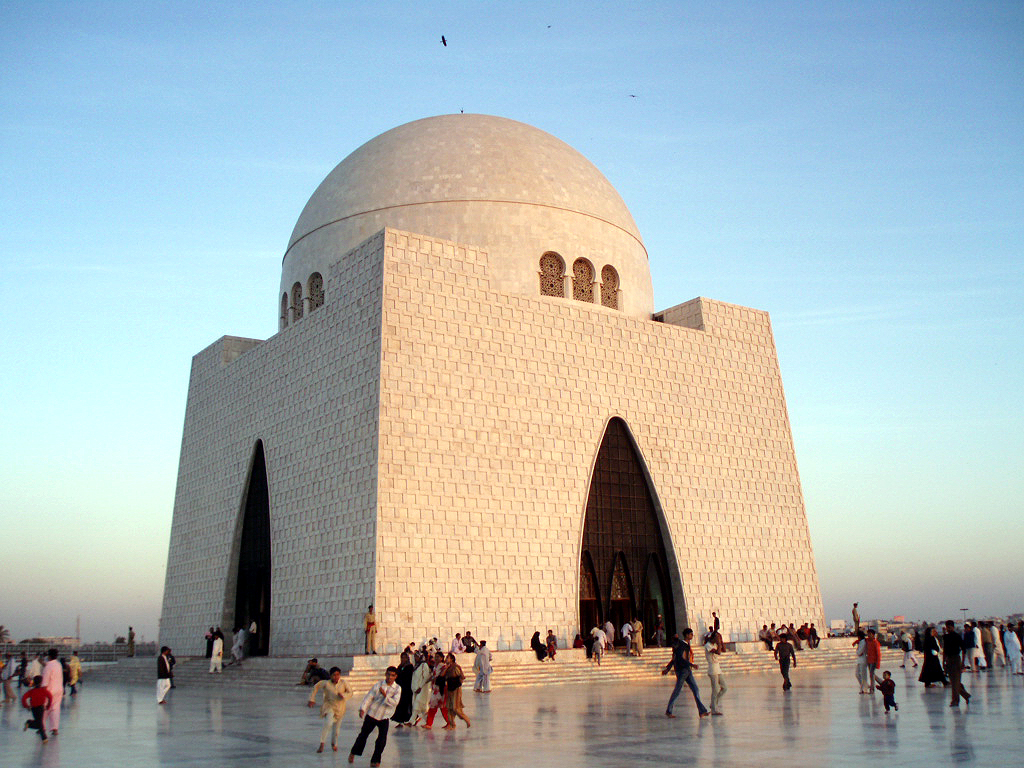
Tomb of Muhammad Ali Jinnah in Karachi

Jinnah was buried on 12 September 1948 amid official mourning in both India and Pakistan; a million people gathered for his funeral led by Shabbir Ahmad Usmani. Indian Governor-General Rajagopalachari cancelled an official reception that day in Jinnah's honour. Today, Jinnah rests in a large marble mausoleum, Mazar-e-Quaid, in Karachi.

=== Aftermath ===
After Jinnah died, his sister Fatima asked the court to execute Jinnah's will under Shia Islamic law. This subsequently became part of the argument in Pakistan about Jinnah's religious affiliation. Iranian-American academic Vali Nasr claimed that Jinnah "was an Ismaili by birth and a Twelver Shia by confession, though not a religiously observant man." In a 1970 legal challenge, Hussain Ali Ganji Walji claimed Jinnah had converted to Sunni Islam. Witness Syed Sharifuddin Pirzada stated in court that Jinnah converted to Sunni Islam in 1901 when his sisters married Sunnis. In 1970, Liaquat Ali Khan and Fatima Jinnah's joint affidavit that Jinnah was Shia was rejected. But in 1976 the court rejected Walji's claim that Jinnah was Sunni; effectively implying that he was a Shia. In 1984 a high court bench reversed the 1976 verdict and maintained that "the Quaid was definitely not a Shia", which suggested that Jinnah was Sunni. According to the journalist Khaled Ahmed, Jinnah publicly had a non-sectarian stance and "was at pains to gather the Muslims of India under the banner of a general Muslim faith and not under a divisive sectarian identity." Liaquat H. Merchant, Jinnah's grandnephew, writes that "the Quaid was not a Shia; he was also not a Sunni, he was simply a Muslim". An eminent lawyer who practised in the Bombay High Court until 1940 testified that Jinnah used to pray as an orthodox Sunni. According to Akbar Ahmed, Jinnah became a firm Sunni Muslim by the end of his life.

== Political philosophy ==
=== Economic views ===
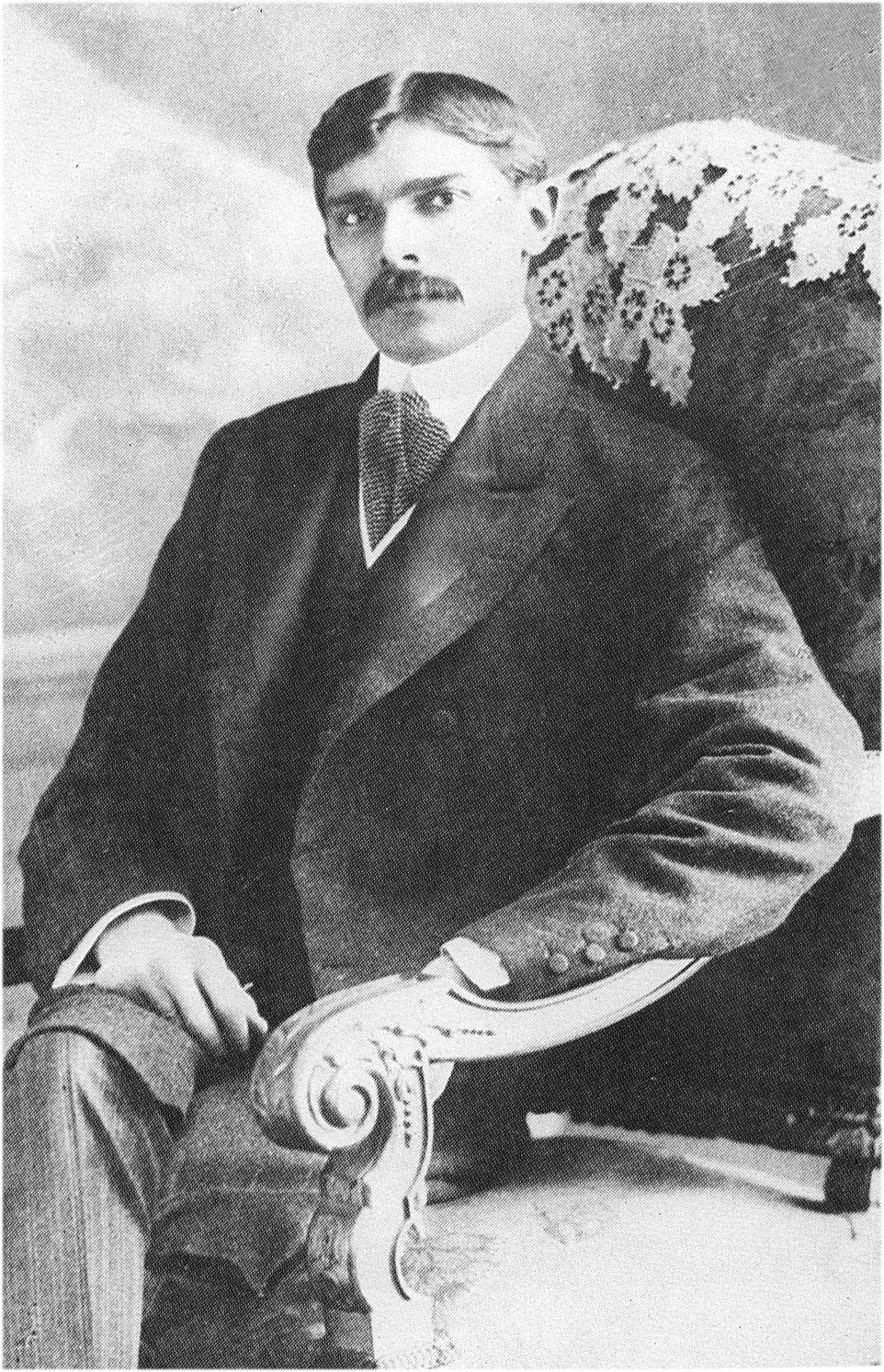
During his time as a barrister in the United Kingdom, a young Jinnah was deeply inspired by welfare movements led by British Liberals and anti-imperialists

Jinnah's efforts to ensure the protection of Muslim rights in India—and later the creation of a sovereign Muslim state in the Indian subcontinent—resulted in his promotion of economic nationalism for Indian Muslims amidst the Pakistan Movement. In 1944, Jinnah created the Muslim League's Planning Committee in Karachi to prepare a five-year programme for economic development—primarily concerning industrialisation—in the Northwest provinces of British India that were expected to form the independent state of Pakistan. In the same year, he also formed the Federation of Muslim Chambers of Commerce to encourage greater Muslim entrepreneurship and involvement in trade and commerce in British India and abroad. Jinnah influenced several economic enterprises to strengthen Indian Muslim economic power in preparation for Pakistan's independence, including encouraging the Ispahani purchase of the Mogul Line Shipping Company, the establishment of MCB Bank, the founding of Orient Airways, and other similar ventures. He also promoted the expansion of Muslim banking enterprises outside of British India, particularly in Singapore.

According to historian Sharif al Mujahid, Jinnah negatively viewed the concept of capitalism as a "vicious" and "wicked" system that exploits the masses, which he would not permit as Pakistan's economic policy, instead favouring a system of Islamic economics. During a public reception in Chittagong in 1948, Jinnah declared that Pakistan should be based on social justice and Islamic socialism. However, Jinnah did not possess a singular economic ideology, instead favouring a mixed economy which would include both private and public enterprise to facilitate industrialisation, and an egalitarian system to provide equal opportunity. He suggested that only the defense and communications sectors should be public, with all other industries open to private enterprise.

During the Muslim League's 1943 Delhi session, Jinnah referred to himself as a communist if communism simply referred to the disestablishment of class divisions and the eradication of poverty. However, he declared his rejection for Karl Marx's communist philosophy and that he sought God's shelter from it. He regarded Western economic ideologies as incompatible with the Muslim world and Islamic economics as a middle ground in the conflict between capitalism and communism.

=== Vision for a welfare state ===
Jinnah's vision for Pakistan was heavily inspired by the first Islamic state created by the Islamic prophet Muhammad in Medina. According to Hector Bolitho, Jinnah was also inspired by British liberalism, particularly the nineteenth century reform movements by activists such as J. A. Hobson and R. H. Tawney, alongside the Fabian Society.

In 1937, Jinnah issued a socioeconomic manifesto for Muslims in British India during a session of the Muslim League, which suggested several reforms including the improvement of working hours in factories, the abolishment of usury, the enforcement of prohibition, and the removal of other "un-Islamic customs" in Muslim society.

=== Religion and the state ===
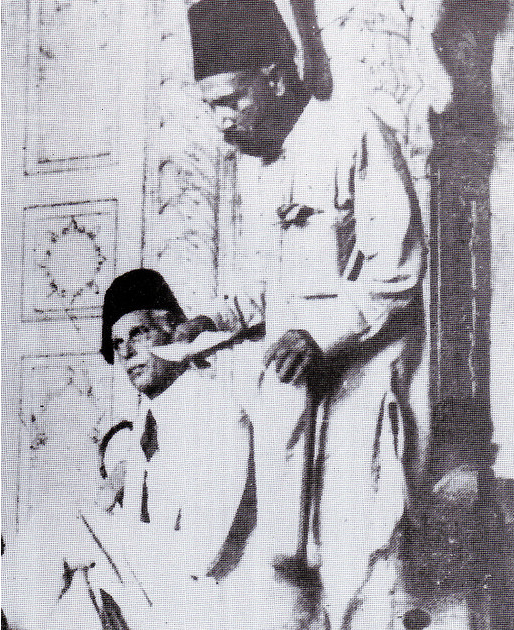
Jinnah with Maulana Zafar Ali Khan at the Badshahi Mosque in Lahore, 1940

Jinnah's position on whether Pakistan would be governed as a secular or an Islamic state remains a contested debate among historians and academics. According to author Pervez Hoodbhoy, Jinnah repeatedly referred to Pakistan's constitutional framework as reliant on the "fundamentals" of the Quran and Sharia without any further elaboration. Hoodbhoy goes on to argue that Jinnah's ambiguity in regard to the topic is due to the political landscape on which the Pakistan Movement was built upon; Jinnah relied on support from zamindars, pirs, and maulanas to achieve a separate Muslim state, and any calls for a liberal and secular Pakistan would result in his dethronement as head of the movement. Pakistani historian Syed Nomanul Haq argues that the liberal argument of Jinnah favouring a secular state are not well-founded due to his Islamic-oriented policies after the independence of Pakistan such as his request for the creation of a new Islamic banking system.

Jinnah's first address to the newly-created Constituent Assembly of Pakistan on 11 August 1947 declared that people of all religions were free to go to their places of worship, and that it was not the business of the state. He repeatedly rejected the notion that Pakistan would be a theocracy, with his assertment that Pakistan would be a state of equal rights and opportunities. Political scientist Ishtiaq Ahmed reasons that Jinnah's ambiguity regarding Pakistan's status as either an Islamic or secular state was because of his desire to lobby several groups with different interests. For instance, Jinnah won support from Shias, Christians, and members of the Ahmadiyya through assurances that the Pakistani government would be neutral on sectarian matters and prevent persecution. However, he won support from members of the Sunni ulama because of their understanding that Pakistan would be a state based on Islamic laws, not a secular one.

== Legacy and honours ==
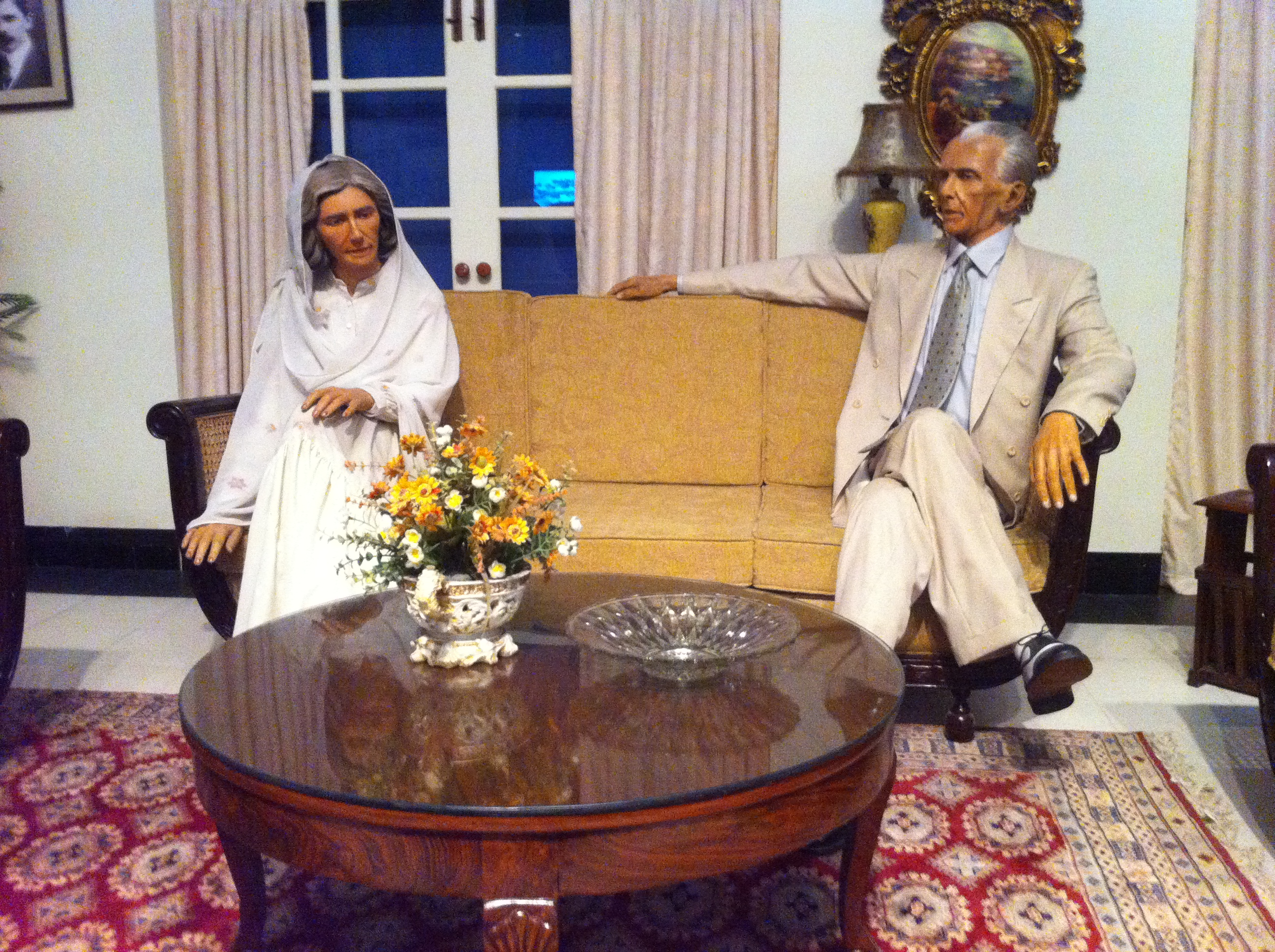
Jinnah and his sister Fatima. Wax statues in the Lok Virsa Museum at the Pakistan Monument, Islamabad.

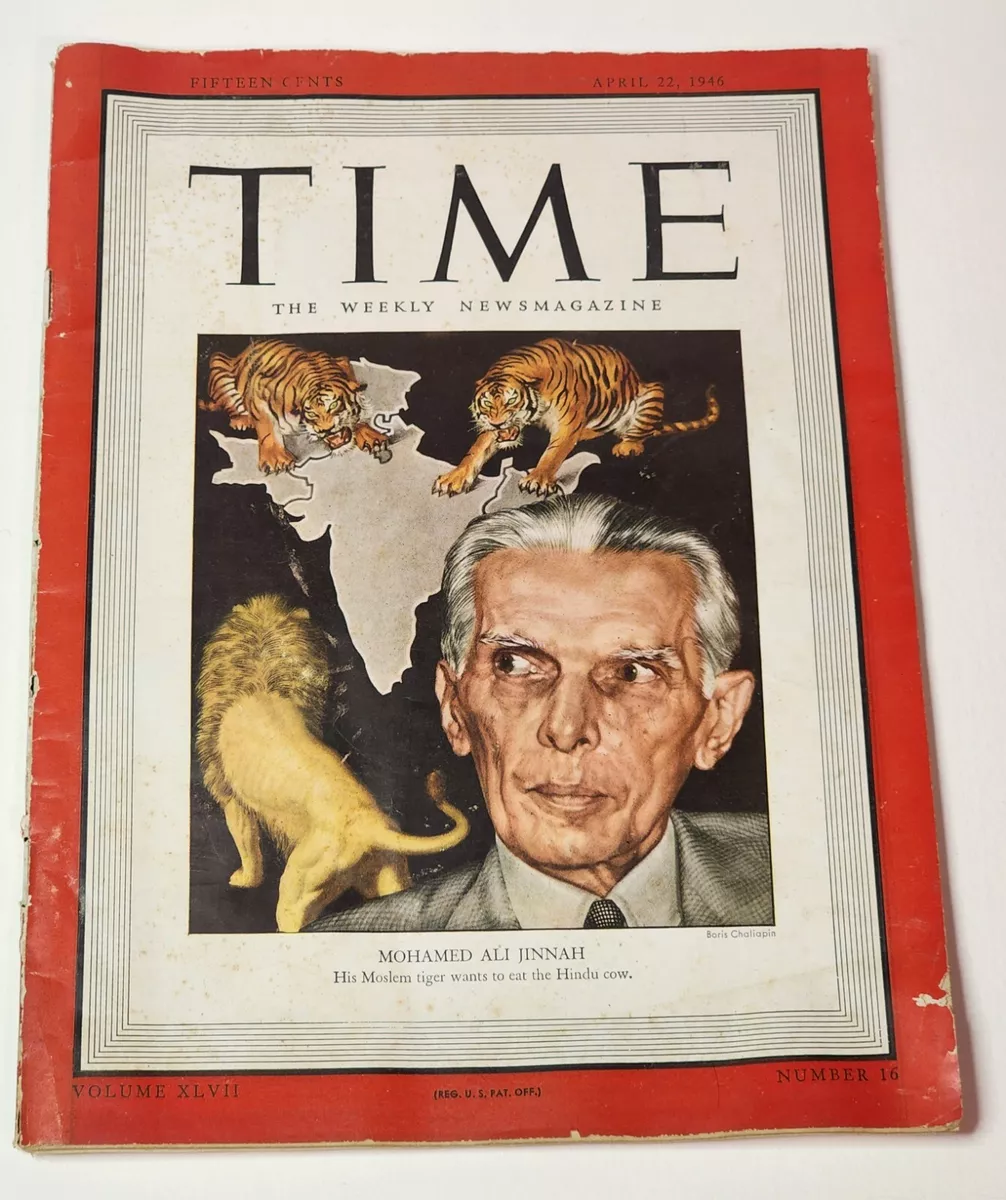
Iconic 1946 Time cover of Muhammad Ali Jinnah

Jinnah's legacy is Pakistan. According to Mohiuddin, "He was and continues to be as highly honored in Pakistan as [first US president] George Washington is in the United States ... Pakistan owes its very existence to his drive, tenacity, and judgment ... Jinnah's importance in the creation of Pakistan was monumental and immeasurable." American historian Stanley Wolpert, giving a speech in honour of Jinnah in 1998, deemed him Pakistan's greatest leader.

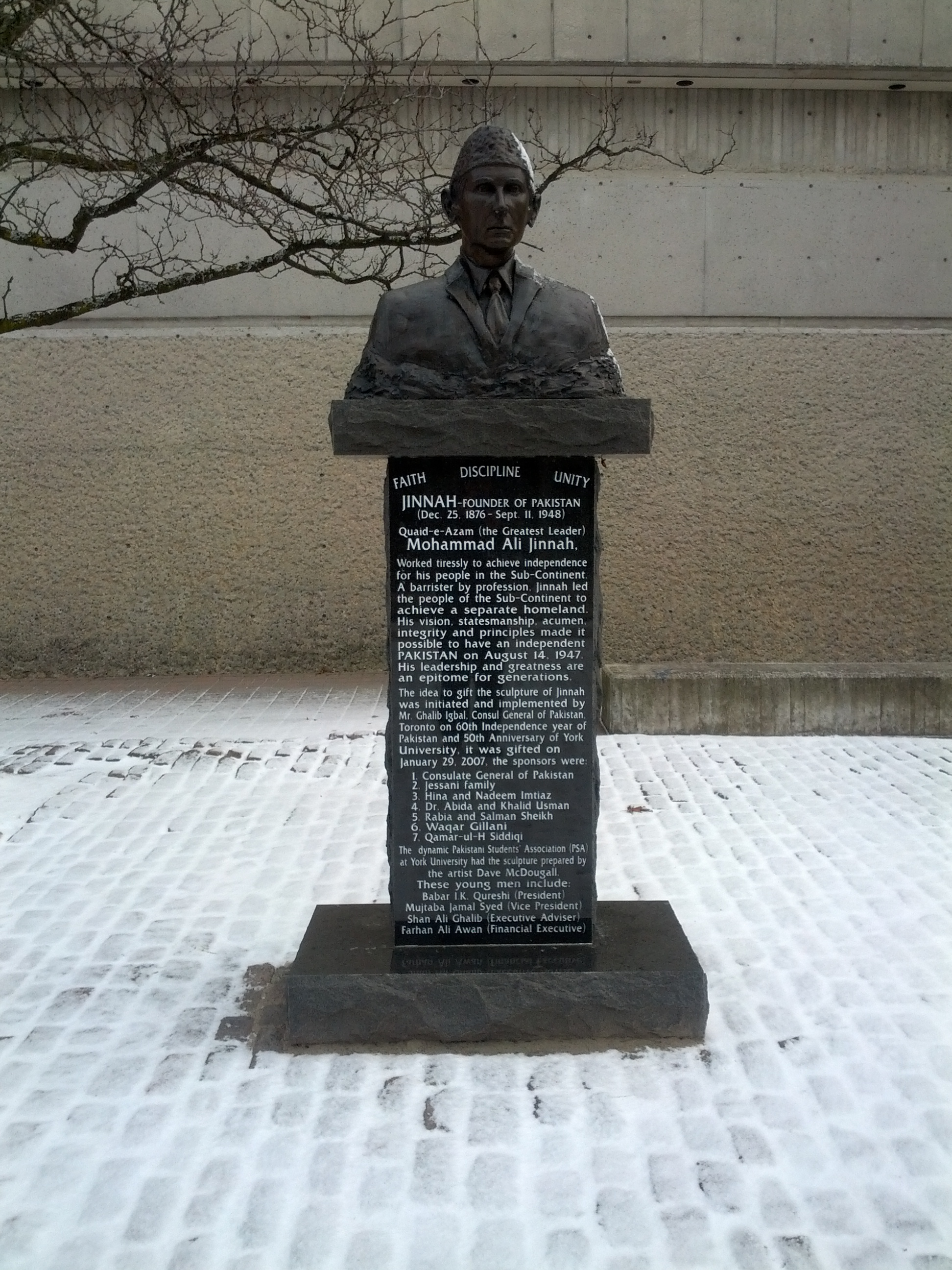
Statue of Jinnah at York University in Toronto

According to Jaswant Singh, "With Jinnah's death Pakistan lost its moorings. In India there will not easily arrive another Gandhi, nor in Pakistan another Jinnah." Malik writes, "As long as Jinnah was alive, he could persuade and even pressure regional leaders toward greater mutual accommodation, but after his death, the lack of consensus on the distribution of political power and economic resources often turned controversial." According to Mohiuddin, "Jinnah's death deprived Pakistan of a leader who could have enhanced stability and democratic governance ... The rocky road to democracy in Pakistan and the relatively smooth one in India can in some measure be ascribed to Pakistan's tragedy of losing an incorruptible and highly revered leader so soon after independence."

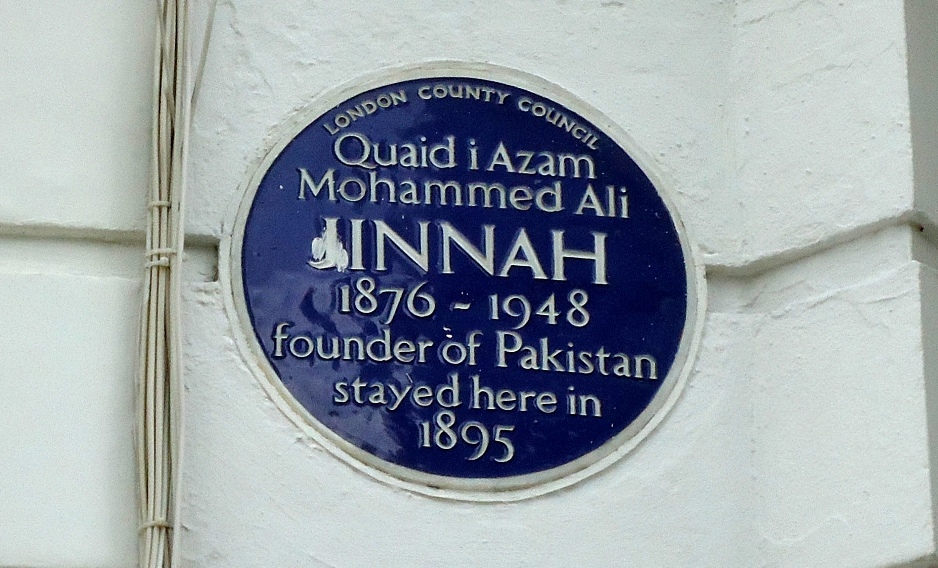
Blue Plaque in London dedicated to Jinnah

His birthday is observed as a national holiday, Quaid-e-Azam Day, in Pakistan. Jinnah earned the title Quaid-e-Azam (meaning "Great Leader"). His other title is Baba-e-Qawm (Father of the Nation). The former title was reportedly given to Jinnah at first by Mian Ferozuddin Ahmed. In 1944–45, Gandhi also began addressing Jinnah as Quaid-e-Azam in his correspondence. It became an official title by effect of a resolution passed on 11 August 1947 by Liaquat Ali Khan in the Constituent Assembly of Pakistan. Within a few days of Pakistan's creation Jinnah's name was read in the sermon at mosques as Amir ul-Millat, a traditional title of Muslim rulers. He has also been described as one of the greatest Muslim leaders of the 20th century.

The civil awards of Pakistan includes an 'Order of Quaid-i-Azam'. The Jinnah Society also confers the 'Jinnah Award' annually to a person that renders outstanding and meritorious services to Pakistan and its people. Jinnah is depicted on all Pakistani rupee currency, and is the namesake of many Pakistani public institutions. The former Quaid-i-Azam International Airport in Karachi, now called the Jinnah International Airport, is Pakistan's busiest. One of the largest streets in the Turkish capital Ankara, Cinnah Caddesi, is named after him, as is the Mohammad Ali Jenah Expressway in Tehran, Iran. In Chicago, a portion of Devon Avenue was named "Mohammed Ali Jinnah Way". A section of Coney Island Avenue in Brooklyn, New York was also named 'Muhammad Ali Jinnah Way' in honour of the founder of Pakistan. The Mazar-e-Quaid, Jinnah's mausoleum, is among Karachi's notable landmarks. The "Jinnah Tower" in Guntur, Andhra Pradesh, India, was built to commemorate Jinnah. The royalist government of Iran also released a stamp commemorating the centennial of Jinnah's birth in 1976. The Jinnah Mansion in Malabar Hill, Bombay, is in the possession of the Government of India, but the issue of its ownership has been disputed by the Government of Pakistan. Jinnah had personally requested Prime Minister Nehru to preserve the house, hoping one day he could return to Bombay. There are proposals for the house to be offered to the government of Pakistan to establish a consulate in the city as a goodwill gesture, but Dina Wadia had also staked a claim on the property.

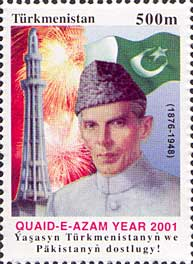
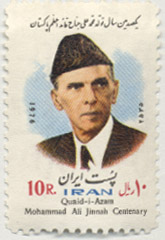
Jinnah's portraits on the stamps of Turkmenistan and Iran

There is a considerable amount of scholarship on Jinnah which stems principally from Pakistan; in his 1969 book Quaid-e-Azam Jinnah : A Selected Bibliography, author Muhammad Anwar listed 1,500 entries, mostly in English, of books, articles and other publications published from 1948 to 1969. This was later superseded in scale by the two-volume Quaid-i-Azam Mohammad Ali Jinnah: An Annotated Bibliography (1978–1979), published by the Quaid-i-Azam Academy, which catalogued approximately 15,000 author entries and 230 subject entries; the bibliography covered books, government documents, periodical articles, unpublished theses, and other materials in multiple Western and Eastern languages, reflecting the rapid expansion of scholarship on Jinnah by the late 1970s. According to Akbar S. Ahmed, it is not widely read outside the country and usually avoids even the slightest criticism of Jinnah. According to Ahmed, some books published about Jinnah outside Pakistan mention that he consumed alcohol, but this is omitted from books published inside Pakistan. Ahmed suggests that depicting the Quaid drinking would weaken Jinnah's Islamic identity, and by extension, Pakistan's. Some sources allege he gave up alcohol near the end of his life. The professor Maya Tudor concluded that "Jinnah could not be described as a practicing Muslim" given his consumption of pork, use of alcohol, and usage of interest. On the other hand, Yahya Bakhtiar, who observed Jinnah at close quarters, concluded that Jinnah was a "very sincere, deeply committed and dedicated Mussalman."

According to historian Ayesha Jalal, while there is a tendency towards hagiography in the Pakistani view of Jinnah, in India he is viewed negatively. Ahmed deems Jinnah "the most maligned person in recent Indian history ... In India, many see him as the demon who divided the land." Even many Indian Muslims see Jinnah negatively, blaming him for their woes as a minority in that state. Some historians such as Jalal and H. M. Seervai assert that Jinnah never wanted the partition of India—it was the outcome of the Congress leaders being unwilling to share power with the Muslim League. They contend that Jinnah only used the Pakistan demand in an attempt to mobilise support to obtain significant political rights for Muslims. Francis Mudie, the last British governor of Sindh, in Jinnah's honour once said:

In judging Jinnah, we must remember what he was up against. He had against him not only the wealth and brains of the Hindus, but also nearly the whole of British officialdom, and most of the Home politicians, who made the great mistake of refusing to take Pakistan seriously. Never was his position really examined.

According to Yasser Latif Hamdani, the concept of direct action became associated with Jinnah in the Indian public imagination following his 1946 call for Direct Action Day, although Jinnah had earlier opposed such methods, warning in 1922 that direct action would lead to bloodshed and should be resisted.

Jinnah has gained the admiration of Indian nationalist politicians such as Lal Krishna Advani, whose comments praising Jinnah caused an uproar in his Bharatiya Janata Party (BJP). Indian politician Jaswant Singh's book Jinnah: India, Partition, Independence (2009) caused controversy in India for arguing that it was not Jinnah but Nehru's desire for a powerful centre that led to the partition of India. Singh was expelled from the Bharatiya Janata Party (BJP) for praising Jinnah and criticising key Congress leaders, positions which the BJP leadership said were contrary to the party's core ideology and discipline.

Jinnah was the central figure of the 1998 film Jinnah, which was based on Jinnah's life and his struggle for the creation of Pakistan. Christopher Lee, who portrayed Jinnah, called his performance the best of his career. The 1954 Hector Bolitho's book Jinnah: Creator of Pakistan prompted Fatima Jinnah to release a book, titled My Brother (1987), as she thought that Bolitho's book had failed to express the political aspects of Jinnah. The book received positive reception in Pakistan. Jinnah of Pakistan (1984) by Stanley Wolpert is regarded as one of the best biographical books on Jinnah.

The view of Jinnah in the West has been shaped to some extent by his portrayal in Sir Richard Attenborough's 1982 film, Gandhi. The film was dedicated to Nehru and Mountbatten and was given considerable support by Nehru's daughter, the Indian prime minister, Indira Gandhi. It portrays Jinnah (played by Alyque Padamsee) in an unflattering light, who seems to act out of jealousy of Gandhi. Padamsee later stated that his portrayal was not historically accurate. In a journal article on Pakistan's first governor-general, historian R. J. Moore wrote that Jinnah is universally recognised as central to the creation of Pakistan. Stanley Wolpert summarises the profound effect that Jinnah had on the world:

Few individuals significantly alter the course of history. Fewer still modify the map of the world. Hardly anyone can be credited with creating a nation-state. Mohammad Ali Jinnah did all three.

== References and notes ==
=== Bibliography ===
- Ahmed, Khaled (23 May 1998). "The secular Mussalman". The Indian Express. Archived from the original on 15 May 2013.
- Ahmed, Khaled (24 December 2010). "Was Jinnah a Shia or a Sunni?". The Friday Times. Archived from the original on 17 November 2011.
- Ahmed, Akbar S. (2005) [First published 1997]. Jinnah, Pakistan, and Islamic Identity: The Search for Saladin. London: Routledge. ISBN 978-1-134-75022-1.
- Aziz, Qutubuddin (2001). Jinnah and Pakistan.
- Banerjee, Anil Chandra (1981). Two Nations: The Philosophy of Muslim Nationalism. Concept Publishing Company.
- Beg, Aziz (1986). Jinnah and His Times: A Biography. Babur & Amer Publications. p. 92.
- Bolith, Hector (1954). Jinnah: Creator of Pakistan. London: John Murray. OCLC 1001456192.
- Campbell-Johnson, Alan (1951). "The Great Acceptance" (PDF). Mission With Mountbatten. Aico Publishing House.
- Dani, Ahmad Hasan, ed. (1979). World Scholars on Quaid-i-Azam Muhammad Ali Jinnah: Volume 1. Quaid-i-Azam University. p. 52.
- "Quaid backed labour struggle". Dawn. 27 October 2003.
- Cohen, Stephen Philip (2004). The Idea of Pakistan. Washington, D.C.: Brookings Institution Press. ISBN 978-0-8157-1503-0.
- "Dina seeks Jinnah House's possession". Dawn. 25 May 2005. Archived from the original on 29 October 2010.
- Eleazar, Sarah (4 November 2017). "'Pakistan's founder worked as a trade union leader'". Dawn.
- Engineer, Asghar Ali (2006). They Too Fought for India's Freedom: The Role of Minorities. Hope India Publications.
- Fischer, Louis (2 November 2010). Gandhi: His Life and Message for the World. Penguin Publishing Group. ISBN 978-1-101-66590-9.
- Gandhi, Rajmohan (1990). Patel: A Life. Ahmedabad: Navajivan. ASIN B0006EYQ0A.
- Gupta, K. R. G. A. (2006). Concise Encyclopaedia of India. Atlantic Publishers & Distributors. ISBN 978-81-269-0639-0.
- Hibbard, Scott (1994). Religious Politics and Secular States: Egypt, India, and the United States. Baltimore: Johns Hopkins University Press. ISBN 978-0-8018-9669-9.
- Jalal, Ayesha (1994). The Sole Spokesman: Jinnah, the Muslim League and the Demand for Pakistan (paperback ed.). Cambridge: Cambridge University Press. ISBN 978-0-521-45850-4.
- Jinnah, Fatima (1987). My Brother. Quaid-i-Azam Academy. ISBN 978-9694130361.
- Karim, Saleena (2010). Secular Jinnah & Pakistan: What the Nation Doesn't Know. Checkpoint Press. ISBN 978-1-906628-22-2.
- Kenworthy, Leonard (1968). Leaders of New Nations. Garden City, N.Y., Doubleday.
- Khan, Zamir (30 June 2010). "Iqbal and Quaid's Vision of Pakistan" (PDF). The Dialogue. V (2).
- Korejo, M.S (1993). The Frontier Gandhi: His Place in History. Karachi: Oxford University Press.
- Roberts, Jeffrey J. (2003). The Origins of Conflict in Afghanistan. Greenwood Publishing Group. ISBN 978-0-275-97878-5.
- Jaffrelot, Christophe (2016). Pakistan at the crossroads : domestic dynamics and external pressures. Columbia University Press. ISBN 978-0-231-54025-4.
- Kazimi, M. (2005). M.A. Jinnah Views and Reviews. Oxford University Press. ISBN 978-0-19-597979-4.
- Khan, Yasmin (2008) [2007]. The Great Partition: The Making of India and Pakistan (paperback ed.). New Haven, Conn.: Yale University Press. ISBN 978-0-300-12078-3.
- Lawson, Alastair (10 August 2007). "South Asia | Partitioning India over lunch". BBC News.
- Lumby, Esmond (1954). The Transfer of Power in India. G. Allen and Unwin.
- Malik, Iftikar H. (2008). The History of Pakistan. The Greenwood Histories of the Modern Nations. Westport, Conn.: Greenwood Press. ISBN 978-0-313-34137-3.
- Mehmood, Syed Qasim (1998). Encyclopedia Pakistanica. Karachi: Qadir Printers.
- Moini, Qasim Abdallah (2003). "Remembering the Quaid". Dawn. Archived from the original on 7 October 2008.
- Navid, Nurul Bashar (15 August 2013). "پښتونخوا کالم: زه بابړه يم". BBC Pashto.
- Raghavan, Srinath (2010), War and Peace in Modern India, Palgrave Macmillan, p. 111, ISBN 978-1-137-00737-7
- Mohiuddin, Yasmeen Niaz (2007). Pakistan: A Global Studies Handbook. Santa Barbara, California: ABC-CLIO. ISBN 978-1-85109-801-9.
- Moore, R. J. (1983). "Jinnah and the Pakistan Demand". Modern Asian Studies. 17 (4): 529–561. doi:10.1017/S0026749X00011069. ISSN 0026-749X. JSTOR 312235. S2CID 144125491.
- Nasr, Vali (2006). The Shia Revival: How Conflicts Within Islam Will Shape the Future. New York: W. W. Norton & Co. ISBN 978-0-393-32968-1.
- Noorani, A. G. (2014) [first published in 2013 by Tulika Books], The Kashmir Dispute, 1947–2012, Oxford University Press, ISBN 978-0-19-940018-8
- Pirbhai, M. Reza (2017). Fatima Jinnah. Cambridge University Press. ISBN 978-1-107-19276-8.
- Puri, Balraj (7 March 2008). "Clues to understanding Jinnah". Economic and Political Weekly. 43 (9). Bombay: Sameeksha Trust: 33–35. JSTOR 40277204.
- Read, Anthony (1997). The Proudest Day: India's Long Road to Independence. New York: W.W. Norton & Co. ISBN 978-0-393-04594-9.
- Seervai, H. M. (2005). Partition of India: Legend and Reality. Oxford University Press. ISBN 978-0-19-597719-6.
- Dawn (11 September 2017). "From Dawn's Archives: The Father of the Nation laid to rest".
- Singh, Iqbal (1997) [First published 1951]. The Ardent Pilgrim: An Introduction to the Life and Work of Mohammed Iqbal. Oxford University Press. ISBN 978-0-19-563979-7.
- Singh, Jaswant (2009). Jinnah: India-Partition and Independence. Oxford: Oxford University Press. ISBN 978-0-19-547927-0. OCLC 611042665.
- Singh, Prakash K. (2009). Encyclopaedia on Jinnah: Volume 5. Indiana University.
- Singh, Nagendra; Mishra, A. P. (2010). Global Encyclopaedia of Indian Philosophy. Global Vision Publishing House. ISBN 9788182202948.
- Sharif, Azizullah (20 February 2010). "Karachi: Restoration of Church Mission School ordered". Dawn.
- Talbot, Ian (February 1984). "Jinnah and the Making of Pakistan". History Today.
- Tudor, Maya (14 March 2013). The Promise of Power: The Origins of Democracy in India and Autocracy in Pakistan. Cambridge University Press. ISBN 978-1-107-32873-0.
- United News of India (9 May 1998). "Was Jinnah a Shia or Sunni?". United News of India via rediff.com.
- Wolpert, Stanley (1984). Jinnah of Pakistan. New York: Oxford University Press. ISBN 978-0-19-503412-7.
- Ziring, Lawrence (1980). Pakistan: The Enigma of Political Development. Dawson. ISBN 978-0-7129-0954-9.
- K. R. N. Swamy (1 December 1997), Mughals, maharajas, and the Mahatma, HarperCollins Publishers India, p. 71, ISBN 978-8-17-223280-1
- Partha Sarathy Ghosh (1 January 1999), BJP and the Evolution of Hindu Nationalism: From Periphery to Centre, Manohar Publishers & Distributors, p. 60, ISBN 978-8-17-304253-9
- Iftikhar Haider Malik (2006), Culture and Customs of Pakistan, Greenwood Publishing Group, p. 61, ISBN 978-0-313-33126-8
- Ludwig W. Adamec (14 December 2016), Historical Dictionary of Islam, Rowman & Littlefield, p. 231, ISBN 978-1-4422-7724-3
- "Special report: The Legacy of Mr Jinnah 1876–1948". Dawn.

Preceded by The Earl Mountbatten of Burma as Viceroy of India	Governor-General of Pakistan; 1947–48	Succeeded by Khawaja Nazimuddin
New office	Speaker of the National Assembly of Pakistan; 1947–48	Succeeded by Maulvi Tamizuddin Khan
