= Caucus Case =

Court case

The Caucus Case was a court case handled by Muhammad Ali Jinnah at the behest of Sir Pherozeshah Mehta at the Bombay High Court in 1905. He won the case and emerged as an outstanding lawyer in India.

In 1908, a number of Europeans, led by C. H. Harrison, who was then the Accountant-General of Bombay, formed a combination to break the power of Sir Pherozeshah Mehta in the Municipal Corporation of Bombay. This combination afterward came to be popularly called the "caucus". Besides Harrison, it included Gell, the Police Commissioner, Sheppard, the Municipal Commissioner, and Lovat Fraser, the then editor of the "Times of India". Lovat Fraser was undoubtedly the most distinguished and gifted journalist who had ever come to India. He wielded a most powerful pen, vigorous and vitriolic; and in his day, the Bombay Times was a power and a terror in the country. He had already made fun of Pherozeshah in a powerful leader, at the time when Pherozeshah staged "a walk-out" from the Bombay Legislative Council, along with a number of other elected members of the Council, by way of protest against the Land Revenue Bill which government had introduced. I believe, this was the first instance of a political walk-out from the Indian Legislatures, which have become so ludicrously common nowadays.

Pherozeshah was always returned to the Corporation from the constituency of Justices of the Peace, who were entitled to return sixteen corporators to the Municipality. The caucus put up sixteen candidates; and vigorous canvassing was made on their behalf by the caucus, so that all the caucus candidates may be elected, and Pherozeshah may be ousted. According to Setalvad, even Lowndes canvassed briskly for the caucus candidates in the Bombay Bar. When the result of the election was announced, these sixteen candidates got in; and Pherozeshah stood 17th, so that the caucus appeared to have achieved its object. However, as luck would have it, the last caucus candidate elected was one Suleman Abdul Wahed, who was a partner in the firm of Ludha Ibrahim & Co. This firm held large contracts from the Municipality. His election was thereupon challenged by Muhammad Ali Jinnah at the behest of Sir Pherozeshah Mehta before the Chief Judge of the Small Causes Court, who has jurisdiction over election petitions. Suleman Abdul Wahed was declared disqualified for serving as a member of the Corporation, with the result that Pherozeshah got in automatically; and all the elaborate plans of the caucus were upset. This abortive attempt to destroy Pherozeshah's domination in the Municipal Corporation resulted in enhancing his influence, popularity and prestige, both in the Corporation and with the public generally.
