= Creating a New Medina =

Creating a New Medina: State Power, Islam, and the Quest for Pakistan in Late Colonial North India (ISBN 978-1-107-05212-3) is an academic monograph on the Partition of India by Venkat Dhulipala, a Professor of South Asian History at University of North Carolina. The work attracted mixed reception — while Ian Talbot, Gail Minault and David Gilmartin admired the work as a significant intervention, reviews by Barbara D. Metcalf, Faisal Devji, Yasmin Khan, Manan Ahmed Asif, and Julian Levesque were scathing.
