= List of properties of Muhammad Ali Jinnah =

Muhammad Ali Jinnah also known as Quaid-e-Azam, was the founder and first governor-general of Pakistan. He was renowned as a barrister and statesman, and played a pivotal role in the establishment of Pakistan. He gained prominence as one of the era's most highly regarded legal practitioners, commanding a fee of approximately Rs.1,500 per case. Jinnah's affluence and autonomy facilitated his ability to express his thoughts freely.

Jinnah held a profound connection to his possessions and accumulated wealth. When he ultimately departed for Pakistan, he departed from his usual meticulousness by leaving his residence, properties, and personal matters in a state of disarray. Every aspect of his ownership, spanning from his residence and servants to his financial assets, had to be entrusted to his lawyer for resolution.

Jinnah had dedicated his properties to Aligarh Muslim University, Sindh Madressatul Islam University in Karachi, and Islamia College Peshawar.

== List ==
Jinnah owned several properties during his lifetime.

=== Pakistan ===
- Jinnah Mansion, Lahore
- Quaid-e-Azam House
- Quaid-e-Azam Residency, Balochistan
- Wazir Mansion, Karachi
- Bagh-e-Quaid-e-Azam

=== India ===
- Jinnah House, Mumbai

Jinnah also possessed a bungalow facing the sea in the upscale Malabar Hill area of South Mumbai, known as Jinnah House. The establishment was initially erected by demolishing another Goanese-style bungalow named South Court, which occupied the same spot. After his marriage to Rattanbai Petit in 1918, Muhammad Ali Jinnah and his spouse made South Court their residence. However, following Rattanbai's passing, Jinnah dismantled the South Court bungalow and commenced the construction of a new dwelling. This property would later become a significant source of dispute between India and Pakistan for many years. Presently, the house is under the ownership of the Indian government, inaccessible to visitors as it remains locked and secured.

Jinnah also took up residence in a dwelling in Delhi from 1938 to 1947. Situated at 10 Aurangzeb Road, this abode is now recognized as Jinnah House. Originally constructed by Rai Bahadur Sardar Baisakha Singh in 1929, the design was orchestrated by the Bloomfield brothers, architectural collaborators of Sir Edwin Lutyens. Subsequently, Jinnah sold the property to his close associate and industrialist Ramkrishna Dalmia. Eventually, Dalmia relinquished ownership to the Government of the Netherlands for a sum of Rs 5 lakh. Presently, the edifice serves as the Dutch Embassy and is maintained in excellent condition.

=== England ===
September 1931, Muhammad Ali Jinnah acquired West Heath House. Historian Hector Bolitho describes the moment vividly: Jinnah was strolling in Hampstead when he paused before the villa “ three storied villa with many rooms and gables, and a tall tower,” and immediately bought it from its owner, Lady Graham Wood. During his Hampstead years, Jinnah balanced a disciplined routine having breakfast punctually, being driven to Inner Temple’s King’s Bench Walk for his law practice, and conducting his work with methodical courtesy, in contrast to the fiery oration of his earlier political days in Bombay. Visitors of note included Liaquat Ali Khan, who would later become Pakistan’s first Prime Minister, illustrating that West Heath House bore not only legal importance but also political and personal resonance.

A blue plaque honoring Jinnah can be found at 35 Russell Road in Holland Park, which was his residence around 1895. He dedicated four years to the study of law at Lincoln's Inn and achieved the distinction of becoming the youngest Indian to be admitted to the English bar at a mere 19 years of age. It was during a portion of this period, specifically in 1895, that he resided at 35 Russell Road.

== Controversies ==
On 16 November 2021, in response to a hearing of a longstanding 50-year-old lawsuit pertaining to the assets of Jinnah and his sister – encompassing properties, shares, jewelry, automobiles, and bank holdings – a commission led by retired Justice Faheem Ahmed Siddiqui was established as per the directive of the Sindh High Court (SHC).

In India, Jinnah House in Mumbai, is a historic mansion built in the 1930s by Muhammad Ali Jinnah, the founder of Pakistan. It holds deep emotional and historical value for Pakistan and the Jinnah family, who have long claimed ownership. In recent years, Hindu extremist groups have called for its demolition, sparking political and diplomatic tensions between India and Pakistan. Despite its deteriorating condition, the house remains a symbol of shared history and unresolved disputes.
