= Jane =

Jane may refer to:

- Jane (given name), a feminine given name including list of persons and characters with the name
- Jane (surname), related to the given name including list of persons and characters with the name

== Film and television ==
- Jane (1915 film), a silent comedy film directed by Frank Lloyd
- Jane (2016 film), a South Korean drama film starring Lee Min-ji
- Jane (2017 film), an American documentary film about Jane Goodall
- Jane (2022 film), an American psychological thriller directed by Sabrina Jaglom
- Jane (British TV series), an 1980s British television series
- Jane (American TV series), an educational adventure television series

== Music ==
- Jane (album), an album by Jane McDonald
- Jane (American band)
- Jane (German band)
- Jane, unaccompanied and original singer of "It's a Fine Day" in 1983

=== Songs ===
- "Jane" (Barenaked Ladies song), 1994
- "Jane", a song by Ben Folds Five from their 1999 album The Unauthorized Biography of Reinhold Messner
- "Jane" (Century song)
- "Jane", a song by Elf Power
- "Jane", a song by EPMD from Strictly Business
- "Jane Jane", a song by Golden Earring from their 1986 album The Hole
- "Jane, Jane, Jane", a song by The Kingston Trio
- "Jane" (Jefferson Starship song), 1979
- "Jane", a song by the Loved Ones from Keep Your Heart
- "Jane!", a song by the Long Faces
- "Jane, Jane", a song by Peter, Paul and Mary from See What Tomorrow Brings album, 1965]

== Print media ==
- Jane (comic strip), a British comic strip that appeared in The Daily Mirror from 1932 to 1959
- Jane (magazine), an American fashion magazine published from 1997 to 2007
- Jane, a 1900 novel by Marie Corelli
- Jane (play), a 1946 play by S.N. Behrman, based on a Maugham short story
- Jane (Lestocq), an 1890 farce by William Lestocq and Harry Nicholls

== Organizations ==
- Jane Collective, an abortion provider c. 1970
- Jane's Information Group or Jane's, a publisher
- Jane, a part of Estée Lauder Companies

== Ships ==
- Jane (ship), a ship that disappeared in 1816
- USS Jane II (SP-1188), a United States Navy patrol boat in commission from 1917 to 1918

== Other uses ==
- Jane (dinosaur), juvenile specimen
- Jane (software), a GUI-based integrated software package for the Commodore 128
- Jane Street (Toronto), Toronto, Canada
  - Jane (TTC), a Toronto subway station
- Jane, slang term for a female client of a prostitute
- Jane's Carousel, a carousel at the Brooklyn Bridge Park in New York City
- Jane National Park, a national park in Western Australia

== See also ==
- Janes (disambiguation)
- Jain (disambiguation)
- Jayne
- Jayna
