= Jayna =

Jayna is a female given name. It may refer to:

- Jayna Altman, a U.S. beauty queen
- Jayna Hefford (born 1977) a Canadian women's ice hockey player
- Jayna Murray (died 2011) a murder victim killed by a coworker at a Lululemon store in Bethesda, Maryland, USA

== Fictional characters ==
- Jayna, a DC Comics female superhero, member of the Wonder Twins
- Jayna-Zod, Jayna of the House of Zod, a DC Comics Metaverse character, female soldier from the TV series Krypton
- Jaynah, a character from Lona and Lapa

== See also ==
- Jane (given name)
- Jayne (given name)
- Jaina (disambiguation)
- JNA (disambiguation)
- GNA (disambiguation)
- Gina (disambiguation)
- Jina (disambiguation)
