= Jaynie =

Jaynie is a given name. Notable people with the name include:

- Jaynie Krick (1929–2014), American baseball pitcher and utility infielder
- Jaynie Parkhouse (born 1956), New Zealand freestyle swimmer
- Jaynie Seal (born 1973), Australian television presenter

== See also ==
- Jane (given name)
- Jayne
- Janie (given name)
- Jaynee
- Janee
- Jana (given name)
- Jayna
- Janey
