= Jinnah (disambiguation) =

Muhammad Ali Jinnah (1876–1948) was the founder and first governor-general of Pakistan.

Jinnah may also refer to:

- Jinnah (film), a 1998 film about Muhammad Ali Jinnah
- Jinnah: India, Partition, Independence, a 2009 book by Jaswant Singh
- Jinnah Bridge, a bridge in Karachi, Pakistan
- Jinnah family, the family of Muhammad Ali Jinnah
- Jinnah of Pakistan, a 1984 book by Stanley Wolpert

== See also ==
- List of things named after Muhammad Ali Jinnah
- Jannah
- Jina (disambiguation)
- Jinnah Hospital (disambiguation)
- Jinnah Stadium (disambiguation)
- Bagh-e-Jinnah (disambiguation)
