= List of things named after Muhammad Ali Jinnah =

There are a number of landmarks, buildings, roads and parks named after the founder of Pakistan, Muhammad Ali Jinnah (also known as Quaid-e-Azam), as well as other items. This is a list of all such notable items.

== Buildings and structures ==
- Jinnah Antarctic Station
- Jinnah Convention Centre, Islamabad
- Jinnah Bridge, Karachi
- Jinnah International Airport, Karachi
- Jinnah Naval Base, Ormara, Balochistan
- Jinnah Barrage, Kalabagh
- Jinnah Sports Stadium, Islamabad
- Jinnah Stadium, Gujranwala
- Jinnah Stadium, Sialkot
- Quaid-e-Azam Library, Lahore
- Quaid-e-Azam Solar Park, Bahawalpur
- Quaid-e-Azam Stadium, Mirpur, Azad Kashmir
- Jinnah Auditorium, Bahauddin Zakariya University, Multan
- Jinnah Auditorium, National University of Sciences and Technology, Islamabad
- Jinnah Park, Sharqi Colony, Vehari
- Jinnah Park, Winnipeg, Canada
- Jinnah Park, Rawalpindi
- Mohammed Ali Jinnah Memorial Mosque, Port of Spain, Trinidad and Tobago

== Hospitals ==
- Jinnah Hospital, Kabul
- Jinnah Hospital, Karachi
- Jinnah Hospital, Lahore

== Organisations ==
- Jinnah Institute

== Landmarks ==
- Bagh-e-Jinnah, Karachi
- Jinnah Garden, Faisalabad
- Jinnah Park, Rawalpindi
- Bagh-e-Jinnah, Lahore
- Bagh-e-Quaid-e-Azam, Karachi
- Jinnah House, Lahore
- Jinnah House, Mumbai
- Jinnah Tower, Guntur, Andhra Pradesh, India
- Muhammad Ali Jinnah House, Delhi
- Mazar-e-Quaid, Karachi
- Quaid-e-Azam House, Karachi
- Quaid-e-Azam Residency, Ziarat, Balochistan
- Quaid-e-Azam tourist lodge, Barsala, Muzaffarabad, Azad Kashmir
- Jinnah Bagh, larkana
- jinnah chowk, seoni India

== Places ==
- Jinnah Colony, Faisalabad
- Jinnahabad, Abbottabad
- Jinnah Town, Sadiqabad

== Political groups ==
- Jinnah Muslim League
- Pakistan Muslim League (Jinnah)
- Pakistan Muslim League (Quaid-e-Azam)

== Roads ==
- Cinnah Caddesi, Ankara, Turkey
- Mohammad Ali Jenah Expressway, Tehran, Iran
- Mohammad Ali Janah Street, Amman, Jordan
- Muhammad Ali Jinnah Way, Coney Island Avenue, New York City, United States
- Muhammad Ali Jinnah Way, Devon Avenue, Chicago, United States
- Muhammad Ali Jinnah Road, Riyadh, Saudi Arabia
- Muhammad Ali Jinnah Road, Karachi
- Shahrah-e-Quaid-e-Azam, Lahore
- M A Jinnah road, Quetta
- M A Jinnah Road, Mirpurkhas
- Quaid-i-Azam Road, Benazirabad
- M A Jinnah Road, Okara
- M A Jinnah Avenue, Blue Area, Islamabad
- Jinnah Close, Birmingham United Kingdom
- Jinnah Road, Redditch, Worcestershire, United Kingdom
- Jinnah Court in Bradford, United Kingdom

== Ships ==
- Jinnah-class frigate

== Sport ==
- Quaid-e-Azam Inter Provincial Youth Games
- Quaid-e-Azam Trophy, Pakistan's domestic first-class cricket championship

== Things ==
- Jinnah cap
- Tamgha-e-Quaid-e-Azam

== Educational institutes and research centers ==
- Jinnah College for Women, Peshawar
- Jinnah Medical College, Peshawar
- Jinnah Medical and Dental College, Karachi
- Jinnah Memorial College, Nowshera
- Jinnah Polytechnic Institute, Faisalabad
- Jinnah Sindh Medical University, Karachi
- Jinnah University for Women, Karachi
- Mohammad Ali Jinnah University, Karachi
- Quaid-e-Azam Law College, Sargodha
- Quaid-e-Azam Medical College, Bahawalpur
- Quaid-i-Azam University, Islamabad
- Jinnah Antarctic Station, South Pole

== See also ==
- Muhammad Ali Jinnah
- Jinnah family
