= Jayne =

Jayne is a given name and a surname.

== Given name ==
- Jayne Appel (born 1988), basketball player
- Jayne V. Armstrong (fl. 1996), British botanist
- Jayne Atkinson (born 1959), English film, theatre and television actress
- Jayne Baxter (born 1955), Scottish politician
- Jayne Brook (born 1960), American actress
- Jayne Casey (born 1956), English artistic director
- Jayne Cobb, a character from the television series Firefly
- Jayne Cortez (1934–2012), African-American poet, activist, small press publisher and spoken-word performance artist
- Jayne County (born 1947), American performer, musician and actress
- Jayne Eastwood (born 1946), Canadian actress
- Jayne Furlong, New Zealand girl abducted in 1993 and murdered
- Jayne Gackenbach (born 1946), writer and dream researcher
- Jayne Godfrey, Australian emeritus professor of business and economics
- Jayne Grayson, a character from the television series Holby City
- Jayne Hayden (born 1968), former operative for the Central Intelligence Agency
- Jayne Heitmeyer (born 1960), Canadian actress
- Jayne Hepsibah, milliner
- Jayne Houdyshell (born 1953), Tony Award–nominated American theater actress
- Jayne Hughes, the Deputy High Bailiff and Judicial Officer of the Isle of Man
- Jayne Irving (born 1956), British TV presenter
- Jayne Jagot, Australian judge
- Jayne Fenton Keane, contemporary Australian poet
- Jayne Kennedy (born 1951), American actress, beauty pageant titleholder and sportscaster
- Jayne Ann Krentz (born 1948), American writer of romance novels
- Jayne Lawless (born 1974), English installation artist from Liverpool
- Jayne Loader (born 1951), American director and writer
- Jayne Ludlow (born 1979), Welsh football coach and former player
- Jayne Mansfield (1933–1967), American actress
- Jayne Marie Mansfield (born 1950), the first child of Jayne Mansfield
- Jayne McHugh (born 1960), former volleyball player
- Jayne Meadows (1919–2015), American actress, author and lecturer
- Jayne Middlemiss (born 1971), English television and radio presenter
- E. Jayne Mockler (born 1957), American state senator
- Jayne Modean (born 1958), American model and actress
- Jayne Parsons (born 1962), New Zealand Paralympic cyclist
- Jayne Anne Phillips (born 1952), American novelist and short story writer
- Jayne Pierson, Welsh fashion designer
- Jayne Pupek (1962–2010), American poet and fiction writer
- Jayne Walton Rosen (1917–2010), American entertainer, singer and actress
- Jayne Sharp (born 1977), English broadcaster
- Jayne Torvill (born 1957), British ice dancer
- Jayne Trcka (born 1963), amateur female bodybuilder and actress
- Jayne Tunnicliffe (born 1967), English actress
- Jayne West (born 1955), American operatic soprano
- Jayne Wisener (born 1987), actress and singer from Northern Ireland
- Jayne Wrightsman (1919–2019), American philanthropist and fine arts collector, widow of Charles B. Wrightsman

== Surname ==
- Caroline Furness Jayne (1873–1909), American ethnologist
- Erika Jayne (born 1971), American dance/club music performer
- Francis Jayne (1845–1921), British bishop and academic
- Horace Jayne (1859–1913), American biologist, zoologist, professor at the University of Pennsylvania and author
- Ira W. Jayne (1882–1961), American judge
- Jacy Jayne (born 1996), ring name of American professional wrestler Taylor Grado
- Jennifer Jayne (1931–2006), English film and television actress
- Joey Jayne (born 1957) American politician, Democratic Party member of the Montana House of Representatives
- John E. Jayne (born 1943) American mathematician
- Joseph Lee Jayne (1863–1928), rear admiral in the United States Navy, veteran of the Spanish–American War and World War I
- Keith Jayne (born 1960), British television actor
- Mark Jayne, American wrestler
- Mitchell F. Jayne (1928–2010), American emcee and upright bass player in The Dillards bluegrass band
- Randy Jayne (born 1944), American managing partner at Heidrick & Struggles
- Robert Jayne (born 1973), American actor
- Roland Everett Jayne (1886–1937), English Methodist clergyman and biographer
- Sam Jayne, American singer/guitarist of indie band Love as Laughter, formerly of Lync
- Silas Jayne (1907–1987), implicated in the 1955 murder of three young boys in Chicago, United States
- William Jayne (1826–1916), American politician and Abraham Lincoln's personal physician
- William Jayne, birth name of William Jacoby (born 1969), American television and film actor

== See also ==
- Jayna
- Jaynes
- Jane (given name)
- Jain (disambiguation)
- Jaine
