= Death and state funeral of Muhammad Ali Jinnah =

1948 death and state funeral of Pakistan's founder

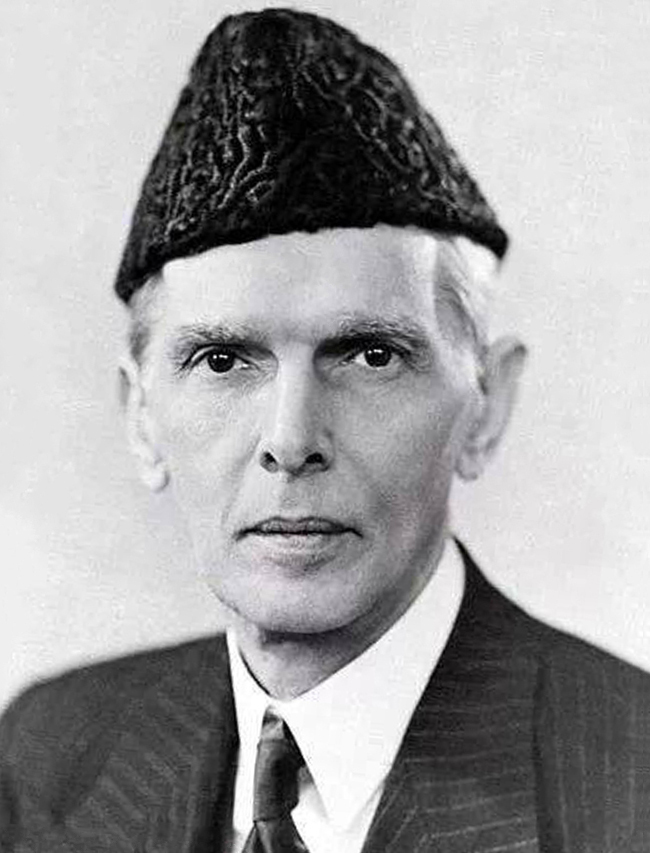
- Jinnah in 1945
- Date: 11 September 1948; (date of death); 12 September 1948; (date of state funeral)
- Location: Quaid-e-Azam House, Karachi; (place of death); Mazar-e-Quaid, Karachi; (place of burial)

On 11 September 1948, Muhammad Ali Jinnah, the founder and first governor-general of Pakistan, died at his home in Karachi at the age of 71, after a prolonged tuberculosis. His state funeral took place on 12 September 1948. He was succeeded by Khawaja Nazimuddin as governor-general.

== Background ==
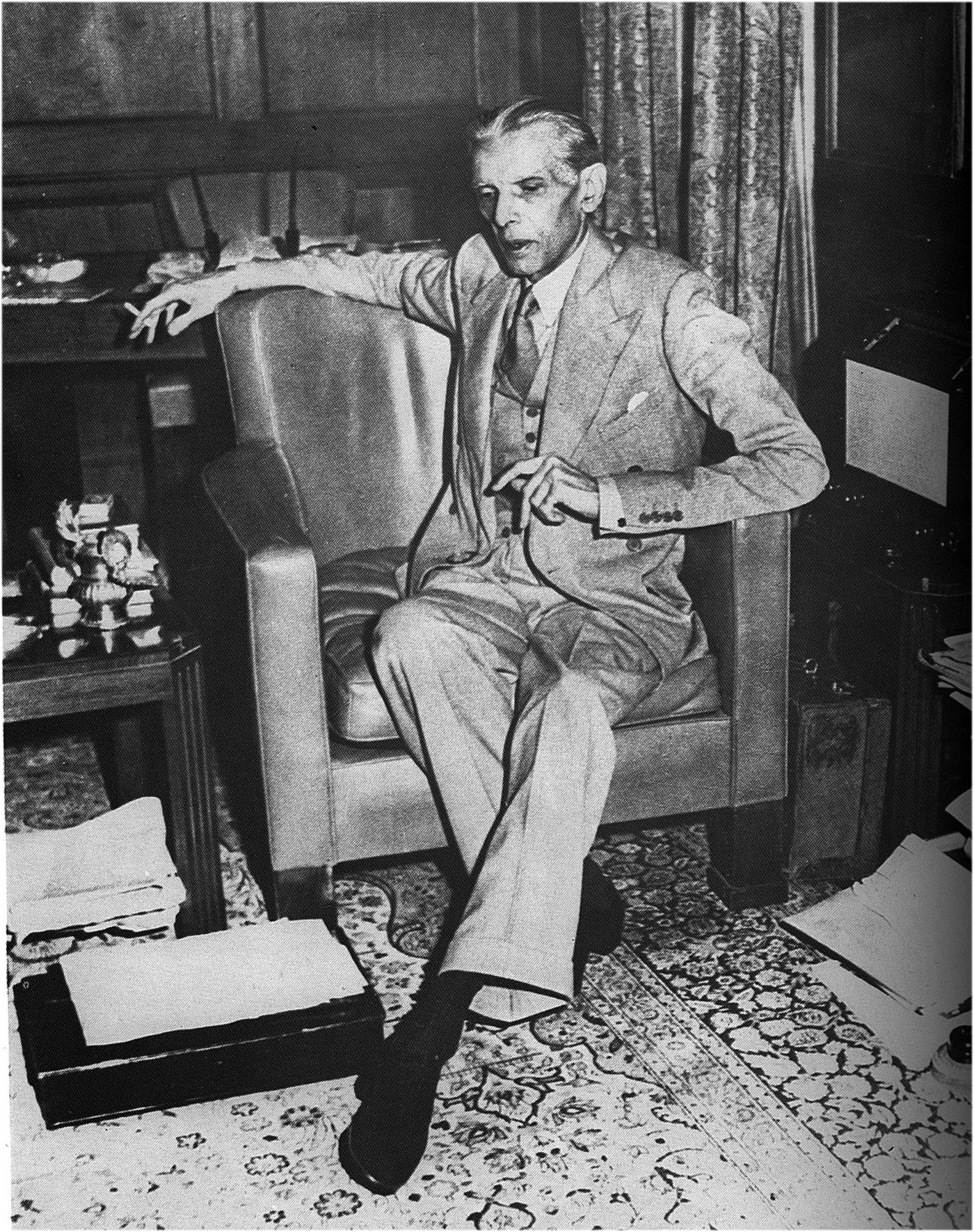
Jinnah smoking a cigarette

Muhammad Ali Jinnah, the founding father of Pakistan, suffered from tuberculosis from the 1930s, a fact only known to a few close confidants, including his sister Fatima Jinnah. The severity of his condition was kept from the public due to concerns that it could undermine his political image and leadership. In a 1938 letter to a supporter, Jinnah downplayed his health problems, attributing his struggles to the exhaustion caused by his hectic schedule, stating, "You must have read in the papers how during my tours ... I suffered, which was not because there was anything wrong with me, but the irregularities [of the schedule] and over-strain told upon my health". Despite his deteriorating health, Jinnah continued to lead the movement for the creation of Pakistan.

By the time of Pakistan's independence in 1947, Jinnah's health had significantly worsened. He was a heavy smoker, consuming up to 50 cigarettes a day for over 30 years, often accompanied by Cuban cigars, which contributed to his deteriorating physical condition. His health was marked by increasingly frequent rest breaks, especially during his last years in office. Jinnah worked relentlessly, at times with a tin of Craven "A" cigarettes on his desk and a box of Cuban cigars close by, even while seriously ill. Fatima Jinnah later wrote, “Even in his hour of triumph, the Quaid-e-Azam was gravely ill... He worked in a frenzy to consolidate Pakistan. And, of course, he totally neglected his health".

Jinnah's health struggles were further compounded by the immense pressure of leading a newly formed country. He worked long hours and often neglected self-care, a reflection of his unwavering commitment to the task of nation-building. As his health worsened, he took more frequent and longer rest breaks, often retreating to the private wing of Government House in Karachi. Only his sister, Fatima, and a small circle of trusted servants had access to him during these times.

In 1948, Jinnah's condition became even more serious. In June of that year, he and Fatima Jinnah traveled to northern Baluchistan, which had a cooler climate, in an attempt to recuperate — residing in Quetta and Ziarat. However, even there, Jinnah could not rest fully and continued his official duties. During this time, he addressed the officers at the Command and Staff College, stressing the importance of Pakistan's security, stating, "You, along with the other Forces of Pakistan, are the custodians of the life, property, and honour of the people of Pakistan". This commitment to Pakistan's future and its defense, despite his fragile health, became emblematic of his leadership style.

Jinnah's final public appearance took place on 1 July 1948, at the opening ceremony of the State Bank of Pakistan. He delivered a speech at the event before attending a reception hosted by the Canadian trade commissioner in honor of Canada's Dominion Day. This was the last public event he attended.

== Death ==
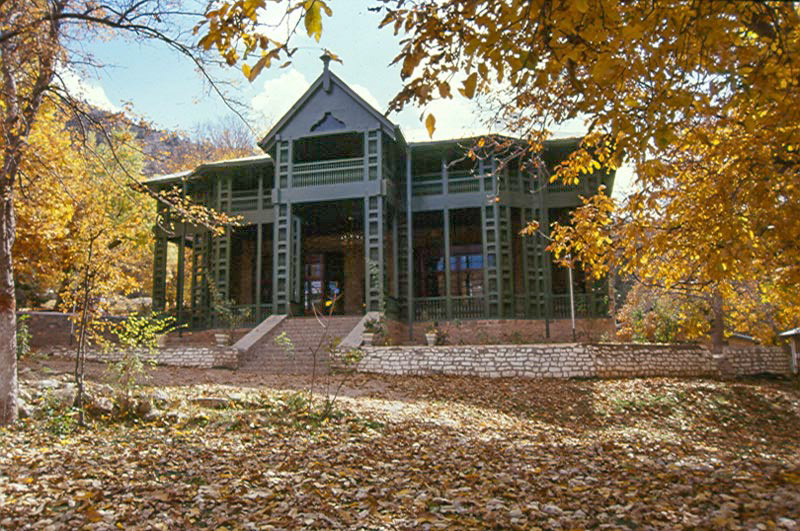
Jinnah spent many of the last days of his life at Quaid-e-Azam Residency, Ziarat, Pakistan.

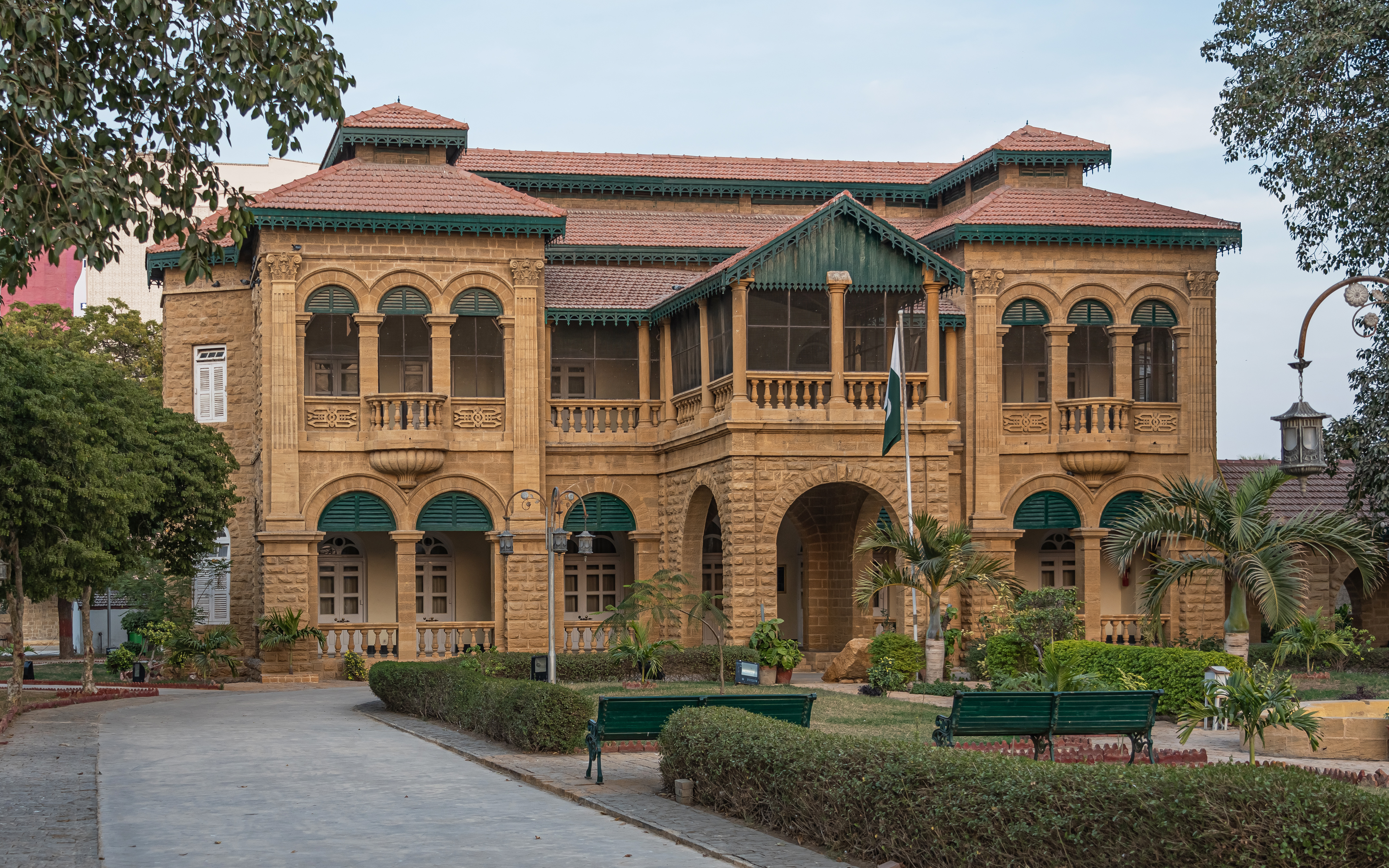
Jinnah died in his home at Quaid-e-Azam House

On 6 July 1948, Muhammad Ali Jinnah, the founder of Pakistan, returned to Quetta in an attempt to recuperate, but at the advice of his doctors, he was soon moved to the higher altitudes of Ziarat for a more suitable climate to aid his health. Jinnah, known for his reluctance to seek medical treatment, was now compelled to acknowledge the severity of his condition. The Pakistani government arranged for some of the best doctors available to treat him, and tests revealed the presence of tuberculosis as well as advanced lung cancer. Despite receiving the new "miracle drug" of streptomycin, which was being hailed for its effectiveness in treating tuberculosis at the time, Jinnah's condition showed little improvement and his health continued to decline rapidly nonetheless.

On 13 August 1948, just days before Pakistan's first Independence Day, Jinnah was moved to a lower altitude in Quetta. A ghostwritten statement was issued on his behalf, expressing optimism and reaffirming his vision for the country, despite his grave condition. At this point, Jinnah's weight had dropped to a mere 36 kilograms (79 pounds), though doctors noted a slight improvement in his appetite. It became evident, however, that if he were to return to Karachi alive, it would have to be very soon. His doctors advised him to leave Ziarat and head to Karachi, where more specialized medical facilities were available. Despite the dire prognosis, Jinnah was reluctant to comply, not wishing to be seen as an invalid. He feared that being transported on a stretcher would damage his image and weaken the morale of his aides and supporters.

By 9 September 1948, Jinnah had developed pneumonia, further complicating his already precarious condition. His doctors strongly recommended an immediate return to Karachi, where they hoped he could receive more effective care. After a brief period of hesitation, Jinnah consented, and on 11 September, he was flown from Quetta to Karachi. Dr. Ilahi Bux, Jinnah's personal physician, later suggested that Jinnah's change of heart was likely due to a premonition of his impending death, and that Jinnah might have known his time was near.

Upon arriving in Karachi that afternoon, Jinnah's limousine was waiting for him on the tarmac. However, an unexpected delay occurred when the ambulance meant to transport him to Government House broke down. The ill and frail Jinnah, unable to sit up, had to wait in the oppressive heat for over an hour by the roadside for a replacement. The tragic irony of this moment was that numerous trucks and buses passed by without their passengers knowing that the nation's founder lay dying by the side of the road. The replacement ambulance eventually arrived, and Jinnah was taken to Government House in Karachi over two hours after his plane had landed.

Jinnah died later that evening at 10:20 p.m. on 11 September 1948, at the age of 71, just over a year after the creation of Pakistan. His passing was a devastating moment for the newly established nation, and his death marked the end of an era. The circumstances surrounding his final hours, including the delay in transport and his deteriorating health, underscored the immense physical toll that the stresses of leading a nation had taken on Jinnah. The last months of his life were characterized by his dedication to Pakistan, even as his body failed him.

== Funeral ==
Muhammad Ali Jinnah was laid to rest on 12 September 1948, the day after his death, amid a nation in mourning. His funeral became a historic event, with an estimated one million people gathering to pay their respects. The procession was led by prominent religious scholar Shabbir Ahmad Usmani, who delivered the prayers at Jinnah's funeral. Among those in attendance were Jinnah's sister, Fatima Jinnah, and his daughter, Dina Wadia, who had remained close to him during his final years despite the growing political and personal divides between them. The scene was one of national grief, with countless Pakistanis paying homage to the leader who had guided them to independence.

Jinnah was buried in a simple grave, but the significance of his resting place grew over time. In the years following his death, the site became a symbol of Pakistan's unity and the enduring legacy of its founder. Today, his remains are housed in the grand marble mausoleum known as Mazar-e-Quaid, located in Karachi, Pakistan. The mausoleum is a place of national importance, frequently visited by citizens and dignitaries alike. It serves as both a memorial to Jinnah's pivotal role in the creation of Pakistan and as a reflection of the nation's reverence for his leadership and vision.

== Aftermath ==
After Muhammad Ali Jinnah's death in 1948, a legal dispute arose regarding the execution of his will, which was requested by his sister, Fatima Jinnah, to be carried out under Shia Islamic law. This situation became a point of contention in Pakistan, contributing to the ongoing debate surrounding Jinnah's religious affiliation. Iranian-American scholar Vali Nasr argued that Jinnah was born an Ismaili Muslim but became a Twelver Shia by confession, though he was not particularly religiously observant. Nasr's assertion was part of a broader discussion on Jinnah's religious identity, as his personal views on religion were often kept private, and his public life was more focused on political and national issues.

In 1970, a legal challenge brought by Hussain Ali Ganji Walji claimed that Jinnah had converted to Sunni Islam, a claim that further fueled the debate. The case brought in testimony from Syed Sharifuddin Pirzada, who stated that Jinnah had converted to Sunni Islam in 1901, following the marriages of his sisters to Sunni Muslims. The matter reached the courts in 1970, when a joint affidavit from Liaquat Ali Khan and Fatima Jinnah, asserting that Jinnah had been Shia, was rejected. In 1976, however, the court ruled against Walji's claim, effectively suggesting that Jinnah was likely Shia, but this decision was reversed in 1984 by a high court bench, which maintained that Jinnah was "definitely not a Shia," implying that he was Sunni.

This legal back-and-forth left the issue unresolved, with conflicting views on Jinnah's sectarian identity. Journalist Khaled Ahmed observed that Jinnah publicly adopted a non-sectarian stance throughout his life, striving to unite the diverse Muslim communities of India under a broader Islamic identity rather than dividing them along sectarian lines. According to Liaquat H. Merchant, Jinnah's grandnephew, Jinnah "was not a Shia; he was also not a Sunni, he was simply a Muslim," emphasizing Jinnah's efforts to avoid being defined by sectarian labels.

Testimonies from those who knew Jinnah also suggested differing views on his religious practices. An eminent lawyer from the Bombay High Court, who worked with Jinnah until 1940, testified that Jinnah prayed according to orthodox Sunni practices. Additionally, Akbar Ahmed, a noted scholar, argued that by the end of his life, Jinnah had become a firm Sunni Muslim. Ultimately, Jinnah's religious identity remains a subject of debate, with various claims and interpretations surrounding his beliefs. However, it is clear that his focus remained on the political unification of Muslims in South Asia rather than religious sectarianism.

== Legacy ==
Indian politician Jaswant Singh praised the founder of Pakistan in his book Jinnah - India, Partition, Independence:

I was attracted by his (Jinnah’s) personality, which has resulted in a book. If I was not drawn to his personality, I would not have written the book... He (not only) fought the British for an independent India but also fought resolutely and relentlessly for the interest of the Muslims of India. He (Jinnah) created something out of nothing and single-handedly stood against the might of the Congress and the British who didn’t really like him...

US historian, Stanley Wolpert:

Few individuals significantly alter the course of history. Fewer still modify the map of the world. Hardly anyone can be credited with creating a nation-state. Mohammad Ali Jinnah did all three.

John Biggs-Davison, a British politician acclaimed Jinnah by stating that:

Although without Gandhi, Hindustan would still have gained independence and without Lenin and Mao, Russia and China would still have endured Communist revolution, without Jinnah there would have been no Pakistan in 1947.

Lord Pethick Lawrence, the former Secretary of State for India revealed to the public that:

It is said that when the Viceroy of India Lord Louis Mountbatten, learned of Jinnah’s illness he said, “Had they known that Jinnah was about to die, they’d have postponed India’s independence by a few months as he was inflexible on Pakistan.

He would also go on to say that:

Gandhi died by the hands of an assassin; Jinnah died by his devotion to Pakistan.

Surat Chandra Bose of the Indian National Congress complimented Jinnah by expressing:

Mr Jinnah was great as a lawyer, once great as a Congressman, great as a leader of Muslims, great as a world politician and diplomat, and greatest of all as a man of action. By Mr Jinnah’s passing away, the world has lost one of the greatest statesmen and Pakistan its life-giver, philosopher and guide.

Arnold Toyanbee, a British historian, stated that:

Jinnah was the greatest politician of the century the world had produced.

== Sources ==
- Ahmed, Akbar S. (2005) [First published 1997]. Jinnah, Pakistan, and Islamic Identity: The Search for Saladin. London: Routledge. ISBN 978-1-134-75022-1.
- Ahmed, Khaled (23 May 1998). "The secular Mussalman". The Indian Express. Archived from the original on 15 May 2013.
- Nasr, Vali (2006). The Shia Revival: How Conflicts Within Islam Will Shape the Future. New York: W. W. Norton & Co. ISBN 978-0-393-32968-1.
- Singh, Jaswant (2009). Jinnah: India-Partition and Independence. Oxford: Oxford University Press. ISBN 978-0-19-547927-0. OCLC 611042665.
- United News of India (9 May 1998). "Was Jinnah a Shia or Sunni?". United News of India via rediff.com.
- Wolpert, Stanley (1984). Jinnah of Pakistan. New York: Oxford University Press. ISBN 978-0-19-503412-7.
