= Gina (given name) =

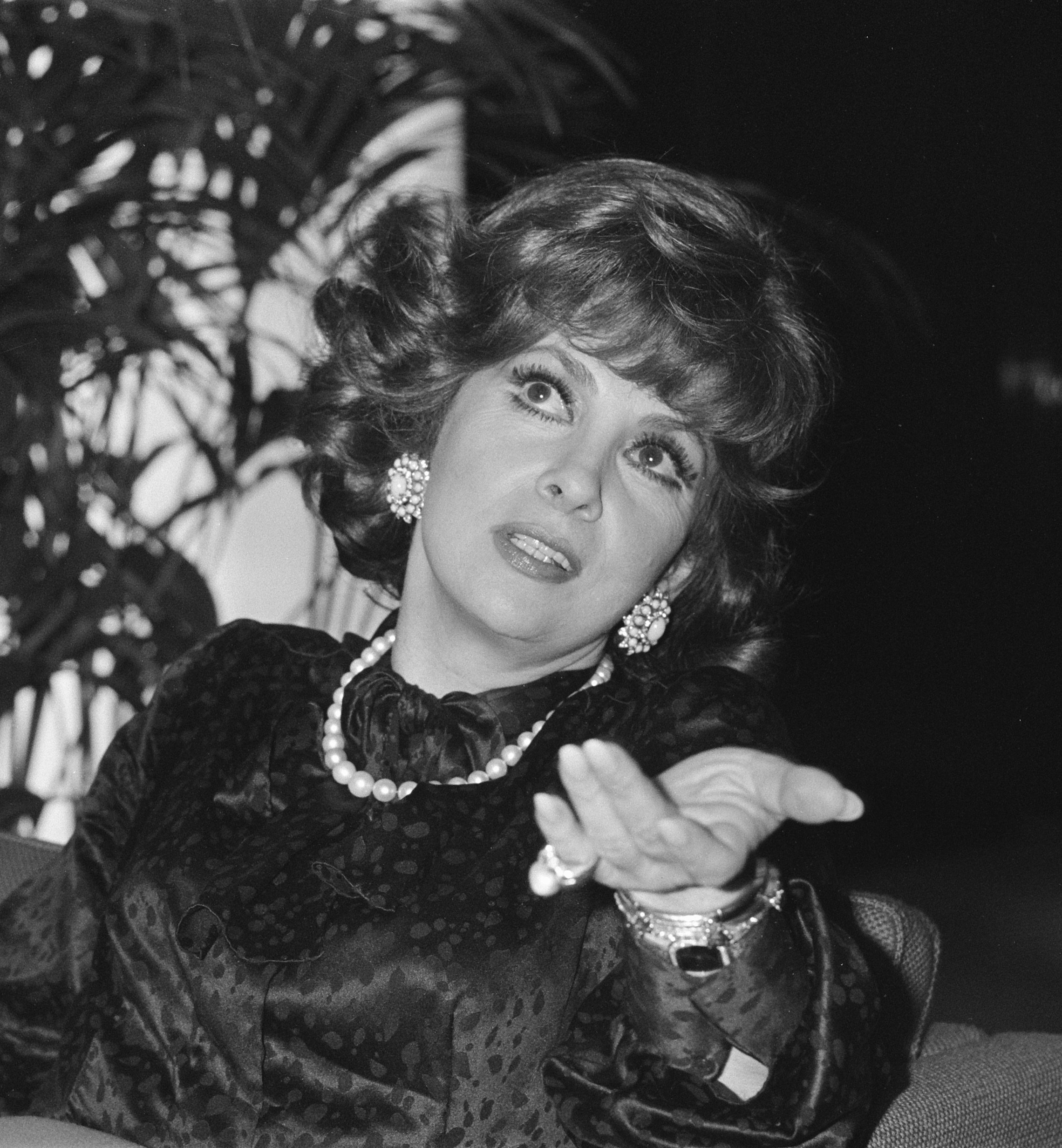
Film star Gina Lollobrigida

Gina (occasional variants Geena, Gena, Jena, Jeana, Jeanna, Jenna) is a feminine given name, in origin a hypocoristic form of names ending in -gina (by metanalysis of the latinate feminine suffix -ina), such as Luigina, Regina or Georgina, also of Virginia or Eugenia.

The short form was popularized in the 1950s by the actress Gina Lollobrigida (1927−2023), whose birth name is Luigina. Lollobrigida became famous in 1953, from which year popularity of the given name Gina in the United States rose steeply, reaching a peak at rank 54 in 1967. Since the 1970s, it has declined steadily, falling below rank 1,000 in 2009.

== People called Gina ==
- Gina Aitken (born 1993), Scottish curler
- Gina Apostol, Philippines-born writer
- Gina Arnold, American rock critic
- Gina Austin (Georgina), American model
- Gina Bachauer (1913–1976), Greek classical pianist
- Gina Ballantyne (1919–1973), Australian poet
- Gina Barreca (Regina), American humorist and professor
- Gina Beck (born 1981), English actress and singer
- Gina Bellman (born 1966), British actress
- Gina Bennett, American intelligence analyst and writer
- Gina Birch, British punk musician, founder of The Raincoats
- Gina Bold, London-born artist of Greek and Scottish background
- Gina Breedlove, American singer and stage actress
- Gina Brown, (born 1966) American HIV/AIDS activist
- Gina Carano (born 1982), American actress and mixed martial artist
- Gina Cerminara (1914–1984), American author
- Gina Choi (born 1987, 지나), Korean-Canadian Singer
- Gina Crampton (born 1991), New Zealand netball international player
- Gina Cruz Blackledge (born 1969), Mexican politician
- Geena Davis (born 1956), American actress
- Gina Din (born 1961), Kenyan businesswoman
- Gina Ferris Wilkins (born 1954), American novelist
- Gina Ford, British writer on parenting methods
- Gina Gallego (born 1955), American television actress
- Gina Gaston (born 1966), American news presenter
- Gina Gershon (born 1962), American movie actress
- Gina Gleason, American guitarist
- Gina Glocksen (born 1984), American singer
- Gina Gogean (born 1977), Romanian gymnast
- Gina Goldberg, Finnish model, actress and singer
- Gina Grant, American who was admitted to Harvard but then had her admission rescinded when it was known she had killed her mother
- Gina Gray (1955–2014), Native American artist and activist
- Gina Green, American Urban Gospel singer
- Gina Guidi (born 1962), American boxer
- Gina Haley (Linda Georgina, born 1975), American singer-songwriter
- Gina Hart, American comics artist
- Gina Haspel (born 1956), American intelligence officer and Director of the Central Intelligence Agency
- Gina Hecht (born 1953), American actress
- Gina Holden (born 1975), Canadian actress
- Gina Jeffreys (born 1968), Australian country singer
- Gina Johnsen, American politician from Michigan
- Gina Keatley (born 1980), Celebrity Chef
- Gina Kirschenheiter, American television personality
- Gina Kolata (born 1948), American science journalist
- Gina Krog (1847–1916), Norwegian suffragist and political activist
- Gina La Piana, Hispanic-American actress and pop singer
- Gina Liano, Australian barrister and television personality
- Gina Lollobrigida (1927–2023), Italian actress
- Gina Lopez (1953–2019), Filipino environmentalist and politician
- Gina Mantegna (born 1990), American actress
- Gina Maria Adenauer (born 1985), race car driver
- Gina McKee (born 1964), English actress
- Gina Montalto (2003–2018), one of the 17 victims who was killed in the Stoneman Douglas High School shooting
- Gina Nemo (born 1965), American actress
- Gina Oselio (1858–1937), Norwegian opera singer
- Gina Pareño (born 1947), Filipino-American actress
- Gina Philips (born 1970), American television actress
- Gina Prince-Bythewood (born 1969), American film director
- Gina Raimondo (born 1971), American politician businesswoman
- Gina Ravera (born 1966), American actress
- Gina Riley (born 1961), Australian actor, writer, singer and comedian
- Gina Rinehart (born 1954), chair of Hancock Prospecting
- Gina Rodriguez (born 1984), American actress
- Gina Marie Rzucidlo (1978–2023), American mountaineer
- Gina Sanmiguel, Ecuadorian politician
- Gina Schock (born 1957, Regina), drummer for The Go-Go's
- Gina Sigstad (1927–2015), Norwegian cross-country skier
- Gina Silva, American newscaster based in Los Angeles
- Gina Stile (born 1965), American rock guitarist
- Gina Swainson (born 1958), American model
- Gina Tognoni (born 1973), American soap opera actress
- Gina Tolleson (born 1970), American model
- Gina Torres (born 1969), American television and movie actress
- Gina Tuttle (born 1973), American actress and voice-over artist
- Gina Wilkinson (1960–2010), Canadian actress, director, and playwright
- Gina Yashere (born 1974), British comedian
- Countess Georgina von Wilczek, "Gina" (1921–1989), Princess of Liechtenstein, the mother of Hans-Adam II, Prince of Liechtenstein
- Gina, lead member of Irish pop group Gina, Dale Haze and the Champions

== Pseudonym ==
- Gina Lynn, American pornographic actress
- Gina Wild, stage name of Michaela Schaffrath, German pornographic actress

== Fictional characters ==
- Gina Cross, fictional character in the Half-Life series of computer games
- Gina Gold, fictional character in the British drama The Bill
- Gina Gray, fictional character. Wife of Michael Gray from the BBC drama Peaky Blinders
- Gina Inviere, fictional character on Battlestar Galactica
- Gina Jefferson, fictional character in Sesame Street
- Gina Kincaid, fictional character in the television series Beverly Hills 90210
- Gina Linetti, fictional character in the American television series Brooklyn Nine-Nine
- Gina Patrick, fictional character in the British soap opera Hollyoaks
- Gina Roma, fictional character in the American soap opera The Young and the Restless
- Gina Rossi, fictional character in the New Zealand medical drama series Shortland Street
- Gina Von Amberg, fictional character in the American soap opera Days of Our Lives

== See also ==
- Gina (disambiguation)
