= Emibai Jinnah =

Wife of Muhammad Ali Jinnah

- ایمبائی جناح એમીબાઈ ઝીણા
- Portrait, c. 1892
- Born: c. 1878; Paneli, Bombay Presidency, British India (present-day Gujarat, India)
- Died: c. 1893 (aged 14-15); Karachi, Bombay Presidency, British India (present-day Sindh, Pakistan)
- Resting place: Karachi, Sindh, Pakistan
- Spouse: Muhammad Ali Jinnah (m. 1892)
- Relatives: See Jinnah family

Emibai Jinnah (Note: Urdu: ایمبائی جناح; [eːmɪbaːi d͡ʒɪnɑː(ɦ)] Gujarati: એમીબાઈ ઝીણા; [/ɛmibɑi dʒʱiɳɑ/]) (1878–1893) was by some sources the first wife of Muhammad Ali Jinnah, the founding father of Pakistan, from 1892 until her death in 1893.

== Early Life and background ==
Emibai was born in 1878 in Paneli Moti, a village located in the Rajkot district of present-day Gujarat, then part of the Bombay Presidency of British India. She belonged to a Gujarati Khoja family of the Nizari Isma'ili Shi’a Muslim community and was the niece of Jinnahbhai Poonja, a businessman and the wife of Muhammad Ali Jinnah, her future husband.

== Marriage ==
In February 1892, 14 year old Emibai married her cousin Muhammad Ali Jinnah, who was 2 years her senior, being 16 at the time their marriage took place. Muhammad Ali's mother Mitthibhai Jinnah was urging him to marry his cousin Emibai, fearing that if he were to go to England, he might marry an English girl. The marriage took place in accordance with the customs of the time and on the day of the wedding, Jinnah was covered "from head to foot in long rows of flowers, strung in invisible white threads", where 14 year old Emibai, dressed in "expensive new clothes, heavily bejewelled, her hands spotted with henna, her face and clothes heavily sprinkled with ittar awaited the baraat".

Emibai came from a conservative background and practiced purdah, maintaining seclusion from male members of the family. Muhammad Ali encouraged his wife to discontinue this practice, believing that such customs were not necessary. Following this, Emibai ceased the observance of purdah within the household.

== Later life and death ==
Not much information is available about Emibai's life following the marriage. The union lasted for about a year, after which Jinnah departed for England to pursue higher education and Mitthibhai, along with Emibai, died shortly thereafter.
