= Janes =

Origin
- Region of origin: English language

Other names
- See also: given names "Jane", "Jan"

Janes is an English patronymic family name. Its root is believed to be from the possessive of the given name Jan (see Jayne), John or Ian. There are two coats of arms associated with Janeses, one Gloucester-based and the other Kent-based.

Equivalents exist in other languages, most often in pronunciation rather than spelling:

- Eanes
- Ianes
- Iōannēs (Greek)
- Janeš (Czech)

== Notable people with the surname Janes ==
- Alfred Janes (1911–1999), Welsh artist
- Clara Janés (born 1940), Spanish poet, writer and translator
- Christine Janes (née Truman, born 1941), English tennis player
- Dominic Janes (born 1994), American actor
- Gordon Janes (1918–1985) accountant, business manager and politician in Newfoundland
- Henry Fisk Janes (1792–1879), American politician
- Jimmy Janes (1947–2020), American comics artist and storyboard artist
- J. Robert Janes (born 1935), Canadian author
- Lorenzo Janes (1801–1873), American lawyer, judge, businessman, and territorial legislator
- Martha Waldron Janes (1832–?), American minister, suffragist, columnist
- Paul Janes (1912–1987), German footballer
- Phil Janes (born 1958), science fiction comedy writer
- Richard Janes (born 1978), English actor, film and theatre director
- Rodney B. Janes (1892–1973), New York state senator

== See also ==
- Jänes
- Jaynes
