= JNA =

JNA may refer to:

== Medicine ==
- Juvenile nasopharyngeal angiofibroma

== Transport ==
- Januaria Airport (IATA: JNA), an airport in Minas Gerais, Brazil
- Jinair (ICAO: JNA), a subsidiary of Korean Air
- Jinan railway station, China Railway pinyin code JNA

== Organisations ==
- Japanese Nursing Association
- JNA Stadium, later Partizan stadium, Belgrade, Serbia
- Yugoslav People's Army (Jugoslovenska narodna armija)

== Other ==
- Java Native Access, a Java software library
- JNA Wireless Association, an amateur radio organization based in Mumbai, India
- Jna., a formerly common abbreviation of the given name Jonathan

== See also ==
- GNA (disambiguation)
- Gina (disambiguation)
- Jina (disambiguation)
- Jinnah (disambiguation)
