= Jina =

Jina may refer to:

- Jina (Korean name), including a list of people with the name
- Jina language, Afro-Asiatic language of Cameroon
- Joint Institute for Nuclear Astrophysics (JINA)
- Arihant (Jainism), also called Jina, a term used for human beings who have attained omniscience
- Five Jinas, representations of the five qualities of the first Buddha

== Locations ==
- Jina Station, Ōigawa Railway station in Shizuoka Prefecture, Japan
- Jina, Sibiu, commune in Romania

== See also ==
- Jinnah (disambiguation)
- Gina (disambiguation)
- GNA (disambiguation)
- JNA (disambiguation)
- Jain (disambiguation)
- Jaina (disambiguation)
