= Jain (disambiguation) =

A Jain is a follower of Jainism, a religion of India.

Jain or JAIN may also refer to:

- Jain (singer) (born 1992), French singer-songwriter
- Jain (surname), a surname and list of notable people with the surname
- Jain, Iran, a village in Hormozgan Province, Iran
- Java APIs for Integrated Networks
- Jain Irrigation Systems
- Jain, a fictional race in Neal Asher's Polity series of science fiction novels

== See also ==
- Chain (disambiguation)
- Gain (disambiguation)
- Jaina (disambiguation)
- Jina (disambiguation)
- Jaine, a name
- Jane (disambiguation)
- List of Jains, a list of adherents of Jainism
- Sahu Jain, an industrial family of India
