= Jane (ship) =

Several ships have been named Jane:

- Jane was launched in 1795 at Norfolk. The British Royal Navy purchased her in June 1804 and renamed her HMS Watchful. It sold her in 1814.
- Jane (1797 ship) was launched in Aberdeen. She spent her entire career as a whaler in the northern whale fishery. She was lost in 1829 in the Davis Strait.
- Jane (1805 ship) was launched at Liverpool. An explosion destroyed her in 1806 on her first voyage as a slave ship.
- Jane (1813 ship) was launched at Fort Gloucester. She transferred her registry to Britain and sailed between Britain and India or Batavia. She was last mentioned in 1820, though the registers continued to carry her until 1826.
- Jane (1813 Hull ship) was launched at Kingston upon Hull as a West Indiaman. Between 1818 and 1836 she was a whaler in the northern whale fishery. She then became a merchantman and was wrecked c.1867.
- Jane (1818 ship) was an American vessel launched in 1810 or 1812 and taken in prize, first appearing in British registers in 1818. She then became a whaler. Under the command of Captain James Weddell she explored the area around the South Shetland Islands and in 1823 reached the southernmost point ever reached until then. From about 1825 on she traded generally as a merchantman until she was condemned in 1829.
