= Flagstaff House =

Flagstaff House may refer to:

- Teen Murti Bhavan - earlier residence of Commander-in-Chief, India and later the residence of the first Prime Minister of India, Jawaharlal Nehru
- Flagstaff House, Hong Kong - earlier residence of the British Forces Overseas Hong Kong.
- Quaid-e-Azam House - a house museum dedicated to the personal life of Muhammad Ali Jinnah, the founder of Pakistan.
- Jubilee House - the presidential palace in Accra that serves as a residence and office to the President of Ghana.
