= South Court =

South Court is the name of the houses of Muhammad Ali Jinnah in India and Pakistan.

- Jinnah Mansion, India
- Corps Commander House, Lahore, Pakistan
