= Jhirk =

Town in the district of Thatta, the province of Sindh, Pakistan

Jhirk (Jerruck)
- Town
- Interactive map of Jhirk (Jerruck)
- Coordinates: 25°3′15.48″N 86°15′19.44″E
- Country: Pakistan
- Province: Sindh
- District: Thatta
- Time zone: UTC+5 (PKT)

Jhirk, also spelled as Jerruck, is a small town on the right bank of the Indus River in the Thatta district of the province of Sindh, Pakistan.

== History ==
In the 19th century, Jhirk was the busiest river port and center of commercial activity in Sindh. It also served as the headquarters of the Indus Flotilla, which was the most advanced navigational system of its time. Karachi Port was connected to Jhirk. The headquarters of the Indus Flotilla was initially in Jhirk, near Kotri, before relocating to Mithankot in Rajanpur district and later to Makhad in Attock. This section of the Indus Flotilla was known by both the Punjab Flotilla and the Indus Flotilla names. The British Indus Flotilla of steamboats, which once navigated the Indus River, is described by Shaw (1998). Hassan Ali Effendi, the renowned educationist who played a key role in establishing Sindh Madrasatul Islam, worked with the Indus Flotilla in his early years while learning English. Quaid-i-Azam was one of his students at the Sindh Madrasatul Islam in Karachi. The Indus River was a crucial communication route between Karachi and Jhirk, which was a significant river port near Kotri. The Indus Flotilla used large quantities of firewood to fuel its steamboats, and Hassan Ali Effendi kept track of the wood and steamboat operations.

Due to its commercial significance, Aga Khan I constructed his palace in Jhirk. Jhirk also boasts one of the oldest British-era schools in Sindh, which is 15 years older than Karachi's Sindh Madrasatul Islam and is still operational.

British Captain April, a spy for the British crown in the 1800s, described Jhirk’s majesty and climate. Stationed there from 1832 to 1839, he noted that Jhirk was a prominent city with a bazaar of 200 shops, where goods were available at lower prices than in Karachi.

Aga Khan I migrated from Iran to Herat after the First Afghan War of 1839, when the British were in Herat. Following the British defeat by Afghanis, he settled in Jhirk in 1843 under British protection. Aga Khan I constructed his mahal or palace, which remains well-preserved. He and his followers, who numbered at least one thousand, along with some British personnel assigned to protect him, settled in Jhirk.

Sir Charles Napier initially established Jhirk as the headquarters for the British Army in Sindh when he arrived in the region, which was part of the Bombay Presidency at that time.

The grandfather of Muhammad Ali Jinnah, the first leader of Pakistan, came to Jhirk for Aga Khan I’s Deedar. He settled in Jhirk for the remainder of his life and is buried there, with his grave still accessible. His eldest son, Jinnahbhai Poonja, who was Muhammad Ali Jinnah's father, married Sheeren Bai, the daughter of Moosa Jumo, in 1874. Sheeren Bai had also migrated with Aga Khan I.

There is a belief that Muhammad Ali Jinnah was born in Jhirk, though most historians and biographers adhere to the official account. A maternity home built by the Agha Khan community was described by the Archaeology Department as the official birthplace of Quaid-e-Azam. A blue plaque with this information was displayed by the Department for over two decades after the partition.

Muhammad Ali Jinnah was admitted to the town's primary school, established in 1870. The school's General Register is missing. Until 1962, Jhirk was listed as Jinnah's birthplace in the curriculum taught in Pakistan. The designation was then changed to Wazir Mansion in Karachi, which became recognized as Quaid-i-Azam's birthplace, leading to renewed controversy over his true birthplace.

A Buddhist stupa on the opposite side of the Indus River reflects the historical significance of the area.

== Present ==
Jhirk's current situation is critical, with very few sources of income available. The population relies heavily on special aid and government grants. Due to the lack of water in the Kotri River, most residents live below the poverty line, leading to widespread abandonment of the area. Fishing and farming resources have been exhausted. Many graduates and young people from the Mallah fishing community either sell brambles or subsist on minimal rural incomes.
