= Jänes =

Family name

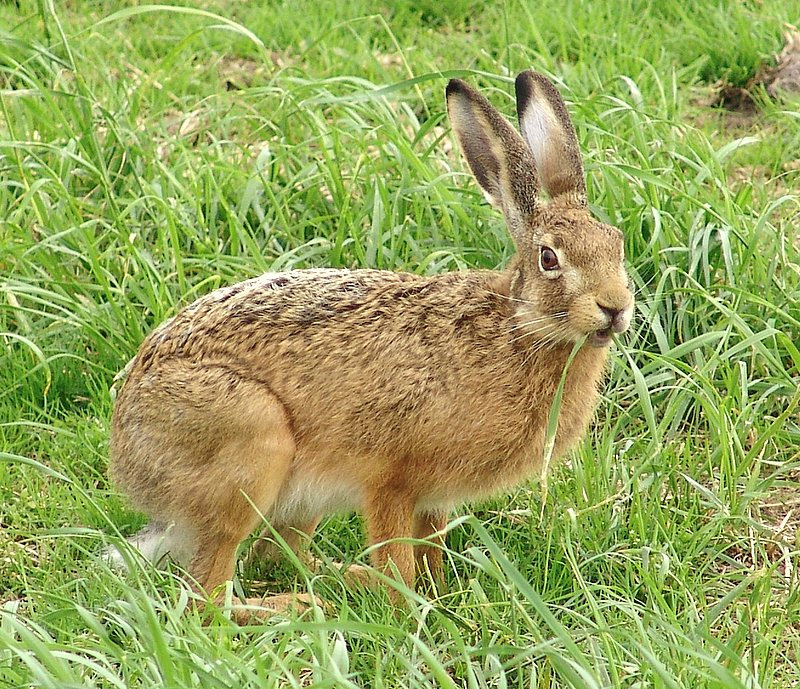

Origin
- Language: Estonian
- Meaning: Hare
- Region of origin: Estonia

Other names
- Variant form: Hare

Jänes is an Estonian surname (meaning "hare"), and may refer to:

- Kärt Jänes-Kapp (1960–2015), journalist and editor
- Laine Jänes (now Laine Randjärv; born 1964), politician
- Peep Jänes (born 1936), architect

== See also ==
- Janes (disambiguation)
