= Janes (disambiguation) =

Janes is a surname.

Janes of JANES also may refer to:

- Janes Information Services, a global open-source intelligence company
  - Janes Fighting Ships, an annual reference book published by Janes Information Services
  - Any of a number of other reference books published by Janes Information Services
- The Janes, a 2022 HBO documentary about the Jane Collective
- Journal of the Ancient Near Eastern Society, or JANES

== See also ==
- Jane (disambiguation)
- Paul-Janes-Stadion, German stadium
- USS Henry Janes (1861), ship
