= Quaid-I-Azam Stadium =

There are several stadiums in Pakistan that have been named after Quaid-e-Azam Muhammad Ali Jinnah. The following is list of Quaid e Azam stadiums in Pakistan:

- Jinnah Stadium (disambiguation)
  - Jinnah Stadium (Gujranwala)
- Quaid-e-Azam Stadium
