= Jaine =

Jaine is a given name and surname. Notable people with this name include

== Given name ==
=== Female names ===
- Jaine Fenn, British science fiction author
- Jaine Green, British documentary filmmaker

=== Male names ===
- Jaine Barreiro (born 1994), Colombian footballer
- Jaine Lemke (born 1998), Brazilian footballer
- Jaine Lindo (born 1990), Sint Maartener footballer

== Surname ==
- Tom Jaine (born 1943), British food writer and editor

== See also ==
- Jaime
- Jain (disambiguation)
- Jane (given name)
- Jayne
