= Wazir Mansion =

Birthplace of Pakistan's founding father, Muhammad Ali Jinnah

Wazir Mansion وزیر مینشن
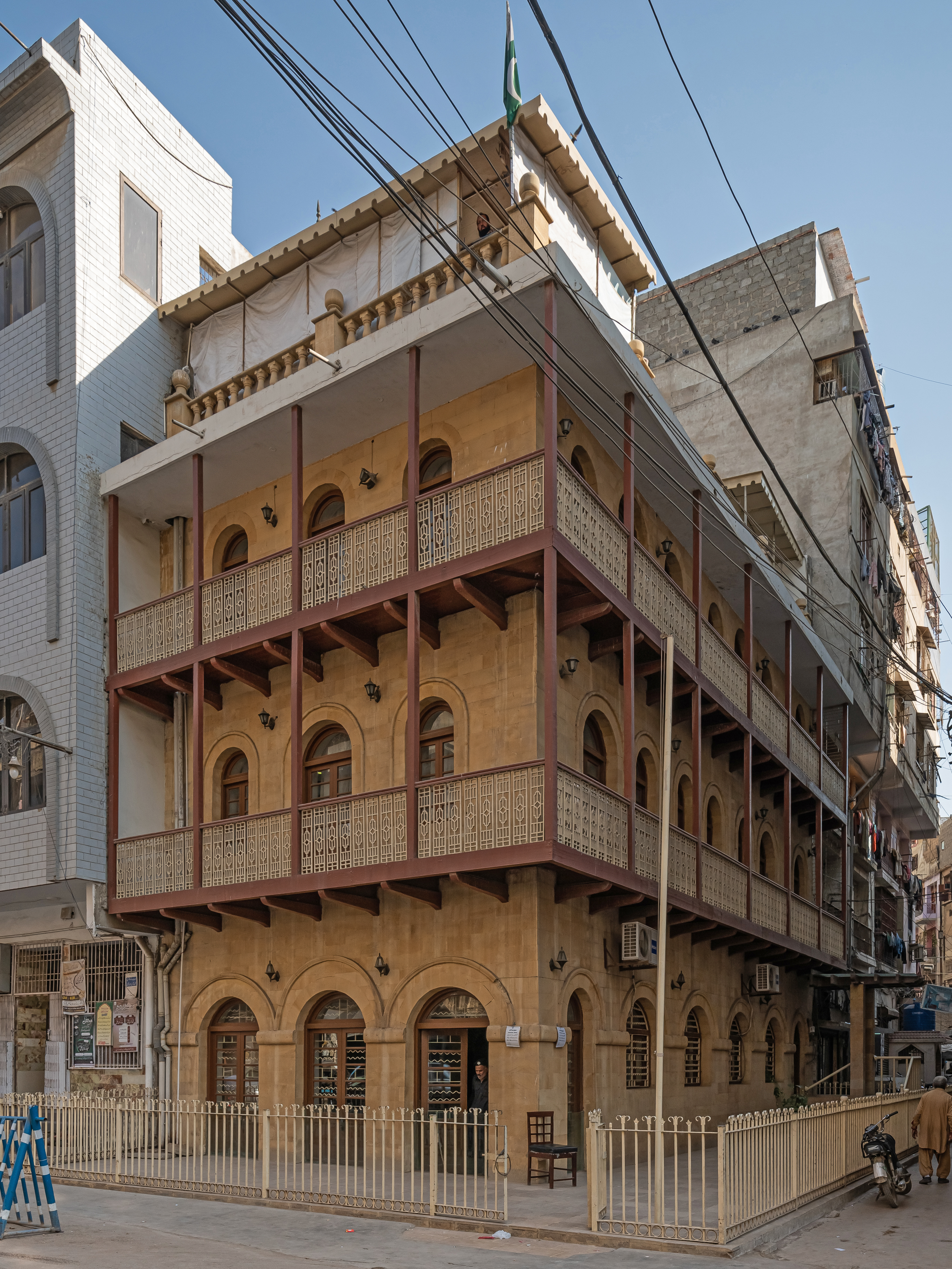
- Wazir Mansion is the birthplace of Muhammad Ali Jinnah.
- Interactive map of the Wazir Mansion وزیر مینشن area
- Alternative names: Quaid-e-Azam House

General information
- Location: Kharadar, Karachi, Pakistan, Chagla Street (now Barkati Street)
- Coordinates: 24°51′3″N 66°59′51″E
- Current tenants: Museum
- Completed: 1866
- Renovated: 2008
- Owner: Government of Pakistan (before 2011); Government of Sindh (since 2011)

Technical details
- Floor count: Ground + 2

Design and construction
- Architect: H Sohak

Wazir Mansion (Urdu: وزیر مینشن), officially known as Quaid-e-Azam Birthplace Museum, is a former family home in the Kharadar district South at Karachi, Sindh, Pakistan. It is considered the birthplace of the country's founder, Muhammad Ali Jinnah.

"It was built during 1860-1870 with stone masonry in lime and jute mortar to suit the volatile weather of Karachi."

== Birthplace of Jinnah ==
"It was an auspicious day of December 25, 1876, when the founder of our homeland, i.e. Pakistan, was born." Wazir Mansion now may be the widely accepted birthplace of Quaid-e-Azam, Mohammad Ali Jinnah, the founder of Pakistan. Once, his birthplace was misunderstood to be Jhirk, an old small town near Karachi, which was later revealed to be untrue. The reality was disclosed in the book My Brother written in the 1960s by Muhammad Ali Jinnah's sister, Fatima Jinnah in his biography wherein she described the salient features of her brother's life. She mentioned their ancestral village, Paneli, in the state of Gondal, Kathiawar, in the province of Gujarat, in present-day India. Their father, Mr. Jinnah Bhai Poonja, had settled in Karachi because of a business partnership with an English Merchant company named Grams Trading Company, whose office was then located in Karachi. Jinnah's ancestral family and their progenies including M. A. Jinnah's daughter, son-in-law and grandchildren have been residents, to this day, of the province of Gujarat and Bombay. Muhammad Ali Jinnah's father got the house (now Wazir Mansion) for rent in 1874 and settled here for some time. By 1900, he again returned to his native state, Gujarat, British India. "Gowardhan Das was also among the owners of this building from whom Wazir Ali Ponawala (from whom the house had got its name 'Wazir Mansion') bought it at some point in 1904."

== After Pakistan's independence ==
The Government of Pakistan, in 1953, acquired this historic building. Under Ancient Monuments Preservation Act, the government protected it. Then the Pakistan Public Works Department was assigned the work of its conservation and renovation. It was formally inaugurated as Jinnah's birthplace museum on 14 August 1953. A project of strengthening, preservation, and rehabilitation was completed by the government in 2010. Now this birthplace museum is a three-storey building with a library and museum galleries.

== Museum ==
The house is now a museum and contains a national archive. "The house where Mohammad Ali Jinnah spent 16 years of his childhood and youth is a precious national monument that provides inspiration to our nation." There used to be a Karachi Circular Railway station called Wazir Mansion. In 2009, Wazir Mansion was closed for renovation temporarily but was reopened for visitors later.

== See also ==
- Jinnah family
- Mazar-e-Quaid
- Quaid-e-Azam House
- Quaid-e-Azam Residency
- Jinnah House
- List of museums in Pakistan
