= Stage Tour =

2026 music rhythm video game

- Developer: RedOctane Games
- Publisher: RedOctane Games
- Platforms: Windows, PlayStation 5, Xbox Series X/S, Nintendo Switch 2
- Release: December 10, 2026
- Genre: Rhythm

Stage Tour is an upcoming rhythm game developed and published by RedOctane Games for PC, Xbox Series X/S, PlayStation 5, and Nintendo Switch 2, that acts as a spiritual successor to both Guitar Hero and Rock Band.

Originally announced for a fall 2026 release, Stage Tour is set to be released December 10, 2026. The game is set to feature traditional controls comparable to both Guitar Hero and Rock Band, including guitar and bass peripherals, a drumming peripheral, vocal support, and also introducing a stylized gamepad mode that was first introduced in Fortnite Festival.

== Gameplay ==
Stage Tour is currently confirmed to contain 5 core gameplay modes:

- Quickplay, which replicates the classic Guitar Hero and Rock Band experience albeit with the addition of modifiers (where the notes could be doubled, the notes could be shuffled around, the song can be sped up to 125% faster, etc.)
- Practice, which allows a player to practice parts of a song and allows them to slow down the track in order to learn the fretting and rhythm
- Judgements, which is similar to Quickplay, but will have a different scoring system with scoring assigned to how accurately timed the notes are hit, similar to Fortnite Festival
- Karaoke, a casual mode where the player and their friends can sing to the songs in the game with no score penalty
- Tour Mode, which will be a rhythm game take on the roguelike genre of games in order to create an experience where no playthrough will be exactly the same due to the presence of power ups that players start with, can earn, and can purchase on each run

== Development ==
Prior to the re-establishment of RedOctane Games and after the release of fan made games such as Clone Hero and YARG, the rhythm genre saw a mainstream resurgence with Fortnite Festival, which saw a partnership with CRKD to distribute guitar controllers and gamepads. Prior to the official announcement of Stage Tour, RedOctane Games partnered with Eidos-Montréal for motion capture and quality assurance, and Third Kind Games, who have developers that worked on prior Activision games including DJ Hero and Guitar Hero Live. Stage Tour is set to be distributed with guitar controllers themed after Gibson brands of guitars, first releasing with a Kramer model while also featuring multiple models of Gibson and Epiphone-branded guitars in-game in a multi-year partnership.

== Promotion ==
Stage Tour has been actively promoted by featuring demo versions of the game and guitars at events RedOctane Games have been present at, including a 7-song demo at IGN Live with the initial revealed setlist, an expanded demo of songs and prizes at San Diego Comic-Con and has a demo alongside an exhibition on some of the new modes featured in game present at Gamescom. Stage Tour has been revealed at Gamescom to be releasing with a full set of hardware bundles, including but not limited to just the game, but also a game + guitar (one or two) bundle deal, a game + full band deal (one guitar, one microphone, offered wired or wireless, and a drumming peripheral, with further options to include a secondary bass pedal and cymbals akin to the Rock Band pro cymbals).

== Soundtrack ==
Stage Tour will feature a soundtrack primarily focused around rock and metal music; the currently announced songs as of November 18 include:

Year	Song title	Artist
2023	"Mimi's Delivery Service"	Good Kid
2006	"Dani California"	Red Hot Chili Peppers
1990	"Get the Funk Out"	Extreme
2016	"Square Hammer"	Ghost
2024	"RATATATA"	BABYMETAL & Electric Callboy
2020	"Terminator Oscillator"	Static-X
2001	"Island in the Sun"	Weezer
2021	"Bite Me"	Avril Lavigne
2023	"Airhead"	Honey Revenge
2007	"For a Pessimist, I'm Pretty Optimistic"	Paramore
2025	"Do Me Like That"	The Paradox
2018	"Jane!"	The Long Faces
2023	"The Unknowing"	Jfarrari
2025	"Siren"	Castle Rat
2020	"Broken Dreams, Inc"	Rise Against
2008	"Psychosocial"	Slipknot
2014	"The Motherload"	Mastodon
2025	"The End"	Mammoth
2017	"Blind and Frozen"	Beast in Black
1987	"Just Like Heaven"	The Cure
1995	"Just"	Radiohead
2022	"Just Pretend"	Bad Omens
2026	"In The Stars"	The Rolling Stones
1999	"All Star"	Smash Mouth
2006	"Starlight"	Muse
2022	"Bad Habits"	Ed Sheeran ft. Bring Me the Horizon
2006	"Red Flag"	Billy Talent
2005	"Pump It"	Black Eyed Peas
2023	"More Than You Know"	Blink-182
1983	"Photograph"	Def Leppard
1982	"Rio"	Duran Duran
1994	"Grace"	Jeff Buckley
1990	"Tornado of Souls"	Megadeth
1989	"Kickstart My Heart"	Mötley Crüe
2023	"Heartbreak Feels So Good"	Fall Out Boy
1986	"Land of Confusion"	Genesis
2022	"Lux Æterna"	Metallica
2003	"I Believe in a Thing Called Love"	The Darkness
2014	"Shut Up and Dance"	Walk the Moon
1995	"In the Meantime"	Spacehog
2024	"...Baby One More Time"	Tenacious D
1979	"I Fought the Law"	The Clash
2000	"Teenage Dirtbag"	Wheatus
1983	"Sharp Dressed Man"	ZZ Top
2023	"Ballad of a Homeschooled Girl"	Olivia Rodrigo
1994	"Parklife"	Blur
2014	"Night Witches"	Sabaton
1999	"When Worlds Collide"	Powerman 5000
2023	"Do Me a Favor"	The Bites
2021	"Limbo Man"	The Dust Coda
2026	"Raised on Rock N' Roll"	The Karma Effect
2004	"Metalingus"	Alter Bridge
2009	"Fire"	Kasabian
2024	"You Wanted War"	Sum 41
1992	"Under a Glass Moon"	Dream Theater
2022	"Handshake With Hell"	Arch Enemy
2025	"The New Flesh"	Sylosis
2026	"Gaslighter"	Alien Ant Farm
2026	"Golden Child"	12 Stones
2023	"The Urge"	Judge & Jury ft. Tyler Connolly of Theory of a Deadman
2021	"Damage Done"	Jonathan Young ft. RichaadEB
2013	"Lola Montez"	Volbeat
2025	"Negative Space"	Silverstein
2017	"The Heart from Your Hate"	Trivium
2026	"Stage Tour"	Steve Ouimette & The Stage Crew
2025	"Baccarat"	Leon Thomas
2016	"Sunset"	The Midnight
2017	"Overtime (Live Band sesh)"	Knower
2023	"Identify"	Ando San
1979	"Whatever You Want"	Status Quo
2015	"Victorious"	Wolfmother
2020	"Tiny Indoor Fireworks"	Biffy Clyro
2022	"Prisoner"	Ankor
