= Jinnah family =

Family of Muhammad Ali Jinnah

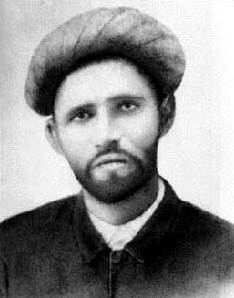
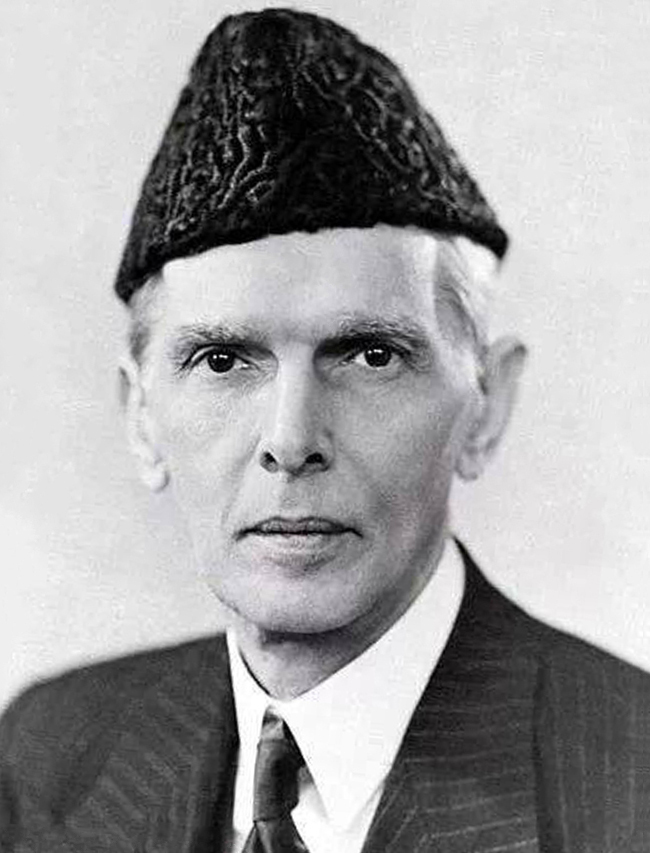
- Jinnahbhai Poonja Fatima Jinnah Muhammad Ali Jinnah
- Country: British India; Pakistan (from 1947)
- Origin: Paneli, Kathiawar, Bombay Presidency, British India
- Founder: Jinnahbhai Poonja
- Final head: Muhammad Ali Jinnah
- Members: Jinnahbhai Poonja; Muhammad Ali Jinnah; Emibai Jinnah; Rattanbai Jinnah; Ahmed Ali Jinnah; Fatima Jinnah; Dina Wadia
- Connected families: Petit family; Wadia family
- Heirlooms: Displayed at Quaid-e-Azam House
- Estates: Wazir Mansion, Karachi; South Court, Bombay; Flagstaff House, Karachi; Jinnah House, Lahore; Governor-General's House, Karachi; Ziarat Residency, Ziarat

Jinnah family of Muhammad Ali Jinnah had long been prominent in British Indian, and later Pakistani, politics. They played a pivotal role in the Pakistan Movement.

Jinnah, often referred to in Pakistan as the Quaid-e-Azam, served as the country’s first Governor-General after the partition of India. His younger sister, Fatima Jinnah, was also a key figure in the Pakistan movement. Many public institutions, including universities and hospitals, have been named in honor of Jinnah and Fatima, and their birth and death anniversaries are recognized as public holidays in Pakistan.

The history of the Jinnah family is somewhat debated among different sources. Originally from a Khoja background, the family relocated to Karachi from Kathiawar, Bombay Presidency in 1875. Jinnah's paternal grandfather hailed from Paneli Moti village in the Gondal state (now part of Gujarat, India). Jinnah was the eldest of seven children born to Jinnahbhai Poonja, a merchant, and his wife, Mithibai. The family was part of the Khoja caste, a group of Hindus who had converted to Islam centuries earlier and were followers of the Aga Khan. Although raised in a Khoja Muslim family, Jinnah later identified as a Sunni Muslim, a shift confirmed by testimonies from relatives and associates later in his life.

== Members of the Jinnah family ==
Jinnah's family was from Khoja caste, who had converted to Islam from Hinduism and were followers of the Aga Khan.

=== First Generation ===
- Poonja Meghji. He was the last generation to give his children Hindu names. He also observed most Hindu religious rituals:
  - Manbai
  - Valji
  - Nathoobhai
  - Jinnahbhai

=== Second generation ===
- Jinnahbhai Poonja. (also referred to as Jina Poonja), a Khoja (1857–1902), was married to Mithhibai.
  - m. Mithhibai
  - Jinnahbhai Poonja was a prosperous merchant. He moved to Karachi before Muhammad Ali Jinnah's birth. He and his wife had 8 children, to whom they stopped giving Hindu names, stopped observance of Hindu chatti ritual, and began giving Quran lessons to their children:
1. Muhammad Ali Jinnah
2. Ahmed Ali Jinnah
3. Bunde Ali Jinnah
4. Rahmat Bai Jinnah
5. Shireen Bai Jinnah
6. Maryam Bai Jinnah
7. Fatima Jinnah
8. Bachu

=== Third generation ===
- Muhammad Ali Jinnah (1876–1948)
  - The founder of Pakistan and was the country's first Governor-General. His first marriage in 1892 was the result of his mother urging him to marry his cousin Emibai Jinnah before he left for England to pursue higher studies. However, Emibai died a few months later. His second marriage took place in 1918 to Rattanbai Petit (granddaughter of Dinshaw Maneckji Petit and Ratanji Dadabhoy Tata), a Parsi who was 24 years his junior. Rattanbai converted to Islam when she married Jinnah. In 1919, she gave birth to their only daughter, Dina Jinnah.
  - m. Emibai Jinnah
    - Dawn (newspaper) Fact File: "In his youth, Mohammad Ali Jinnah was married to a distant cousin named Emibai from Paneli village in Gujarat at his mother's urging. At the time of their marriage, Jinnah was only 16 and Emibai was 14. The marriage was arranged by his mother because she feared that when Jinnah went to England, he might end up marrying an English girl. The couple hardly lived together as Jinnah sailed from India soon after his marriage and Emibai died a few weeks later."
  - m. Rattanbai Jinnah (1900-1929)
- Ahmed Ali Jinnah
  - Ahmed Ali Jinnah was a businessman and, though not involved in politics or public life, he is known for his place within the prominent Jinnah family. He married a Swiss woman named Emmy, with whom he had a daughter, and later settled abroad, living in Switzerland and eventually the United States. He remained largely out of the public eye, and little is documented about his personal or professional life.
- Bunde Ali Jinnah
- Rahmat Bai Jinnah
- Shireen Jinnah
- Fatima Jinnah (1893–1967)
  - Fatima Jinnah was a dental surgeon, biographer, stateswoman, and one of the leading Founding mothers of modern-state of Pakistan. She also played a pivotal role in civil rights and introduced the women's rights movement in the Pakistan Movement. After her brother's death she continued to play a pivotal role in Pakistani politics and in 1965 returned to active politics by running against Ayub Khan in the 1965 elections.
- Maryam Bai Jinnah
- Bachu
  - Died in infancy

=== Fourth generation ===
- Dina Wadia (1919–2017)
  - Dina was born to Muhammad Ali Jinnah and Rattainbai Jinnah (née Petit) in London shortly after midnight on the morning of 15 August 1919. As Stanley Wolpert's Jinnah of Pakistan records: "Oddly enough, precisely twenty-eight years to the day and hour before the birth of Jinnah's other offspring, Pakistan."

She had a rift with her father when she expressed her desire to marry a Parsi from India, Neville Wadia. According to M C Chagla in "Roses in December", Jinnah, a Muslim, disowned his daughter after trying to dissuade her from marrying Neville. Dina Wadia was the only direct living link to Jinnah and the nation of Pakistan claiming her father as its own father of the nation is assumed to have some kind of kinship with her according to Akbar S. Ahmed. His descendants through her are part of the Wadia family and reside in India as she married and stayed in India after the creation of Pakistan in 1947. Dina Wadia lived alone with staff in the New York City, United States. Wadia died of pneumonia at her home in New York on 1 November 2017 at the age of 98.

== Estates ==
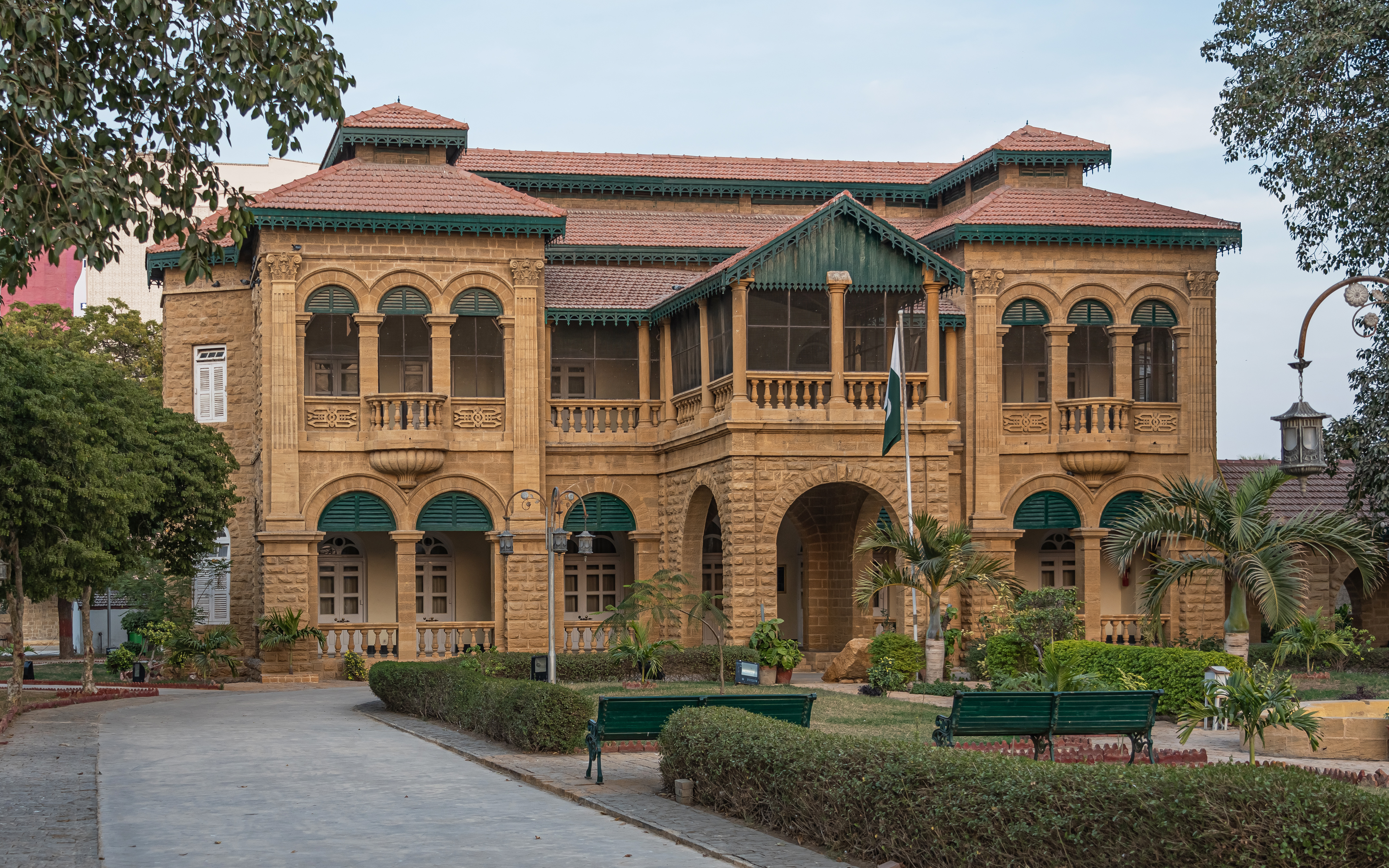
Quaid-e-Azam House

Private estates

- Wazir Mansion, Jinnah's birthplace in Karachi
- South Court, Muhammad Ali Jinnah's former residence in Mumbai, India, currently owned by the government of India.
- Muhammad Ali Jinnah House, Jinnah's former House at 10 Dr APJ Abdul Kalam Road, New Delhi, currently the Dutch Embassy in India.
- Quaid-e-Azam House, Muhammad Ali Jinnah's House in Karachi
- Jinnah House, a property owned by Jinnah in Lahore, currently the Corps Commander House

Official residences

- Governor-General's House, Jinnah's official residence in Karachi
- Quaid-e-Azam Residency, Jinnah's residence in Balochistan where he spent the last days of his life

== Family photos ==
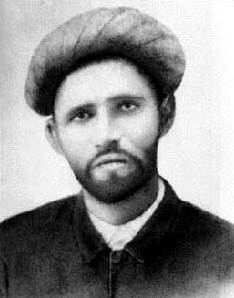
Jinnahbhai Poonja

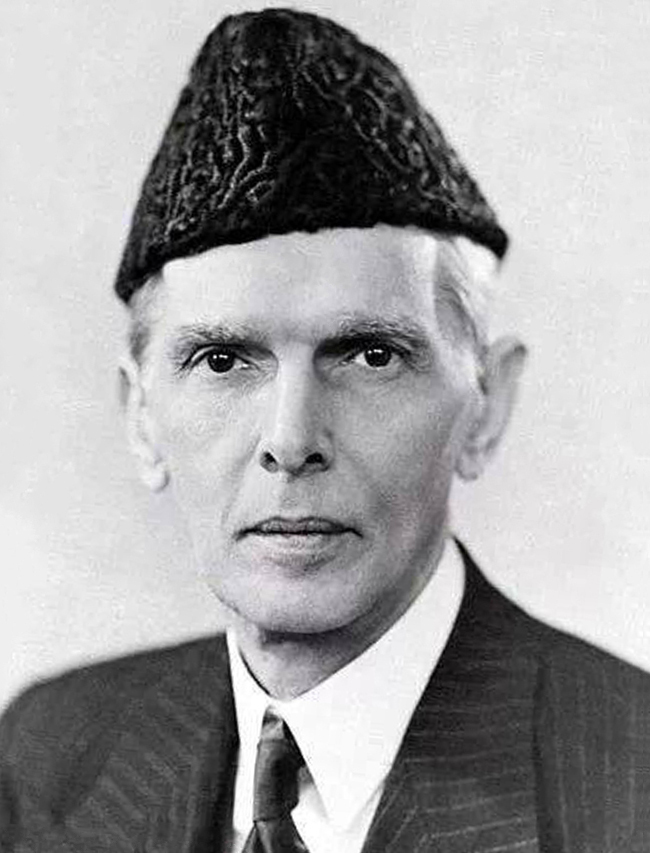
Muhammad Ali Jinnah

Fatima Jinnah

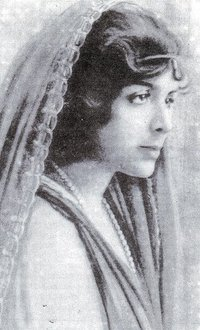
Rattanbai Jinnah

== Family tree ==
Jinnah family tree

Mitthibai Jinnahbhai (1857–1902)	Jinnahbhai Poonja
Emibai Jinnah (1878–1893)	Muhammad Ali Jinnah (1876-1948)	Rattanbai Jinnah (1900-1929)	Ahmed Ali Jinnah	Bunde Ali Jinnah	Rahmat Ali Jinnah	Fatima Jinnah (1893-1967)	Shireen Jinnah	Maryam Jinnah
Dina Wadia (1919-2017)	Neville Wadia (1911-1996)
Nusli Wadia	Maureen Wadia
Ness Wadia (b. 1970)	Jehangir Wadia	Celina Wadia
Jahangir Wadia	Ella Wadia

== See also ==
- Wadia family
- Petit family
