= GNAS =

GNAS may refer to:

- Gnas, Styria, Austria
- Horst Gnas (born 1941), German cyclist
- Georgian National Academy of Sciences
- GNAS complex locus, a protein
- Grand National Archery Society
- Naval Air Station Glenview

== See also ==
- GNA (disambiguation)
