= Jaina =

Jaina may refer to:

- Jain/Jaina, a follower of Jainism, an ancient classical religion of India
  - List of Jains, a list of various notable Jains
  - Federation of Jain Associations in North America (JAINA)
- Jaina Island, an archaeological site of the Maya civilization, in the present-day Mexican state of Campeche
- Jaina Solo, a fictional Star Wars Expanded Universe character
- Jaina Proudmoore, a fictional character in the Warcraft franchise and Heroes of the Storm
- Jaina (grape), a Spanish wine grape

== See also ==
- Jain (disambiguation)
- Jina (disambiguation)
- Jayna (name)
