= Jayne Hayden =

Jayne Hayden (born July 8, 1968, in New York City) is a former operative for the Central Intelligence Agency. She posed nude for Playboy magazine after leaving the agency in 1996. Her photo pictorial appeared in the February 1997 edition of Playboy.

Before entering the CIA, Hayden earned dual bachelor's degrees in Chinese language and Political Science. According to a quote in Playboy, Hayden decided to disrobe for the magazine to demonstrate that "...a woman can be professionally capable without sacrificing her sexuality."

== Sources ==
- Playboy, February 1997.
- The Secrecy News, July 2001 https://sgp.fas.org/news/secrecy/2001/07/072401.html
