= Jane (1813 ship) =

History

United Kingdom
- Name: Jane
- Builder: John Scott & Co., Fort Gloucester, Calcutta
- Launched: 6 December 1813
- Fate: Last listed 1826

General characteristics
- Tons burthen: 461, or 468, or 475, or 478, or 47858/94 (bm)
- Length: 113 ft 10 in (34.7 m)
- Beam: 31 ft 6 in (9.6 m)

Jane was launched in 1813 at Fort Gloucester, Calcutta. She transferred her registry to Britain and sailed between Britain and India or Batavia. She was last mentioned in 1820, though the registers continued to carry her until 1826.

== Career ==
Jane, Maughan, master, was off Portsmouth on 10 May 1815, having come from Bengal and Saint Helena. Jane arrived at Gravesend on 13 May.

In 1813 the EIC had lost its monopoly on the trade between India and Britain. British ships were then free to sail to India or the Indian Ocean under a license from the EIC. Jane's owners sold her in England, and she proceeded to trade from London to India and South-East Asia. Her owners applied for a licence on 3 July 1815 and received it the next day. Jane first appeared in Lloyd's Register (LR) in the volume for 1815.

Year	Master	Owner	Trade	Source
1815	Maughan	Paxton & Co.	London–India	LR
1818	Maughan	Palmer & Co.	London–Batavia	Register of Shipping (RS)
1818	Maughan	Paxton; Maitland	London–India	LR
1820	Maughan	Maitland	Greenock–Calcutta	LR

Although LR listed Jane as sailing to India, she sailed between Great Britain and Bengal or Sumatra. On 16 February 1818 as Jane was returning to Greenock from Bengal, she encountered a severe gale between the Azores and the Newfoundland Banks. She was towed into Cork on 20 March, the storm having dismasted her and almost turned her into a complete wreck. Seven lascars of her crew died of frostbite.

T.Maughan sailed for Bencoolen on 20 August 1818.

Year	Master	Owner	Trade	Source
1819	Maughan	Maitland	Greenock–Calcutta	LR

Jane returned to service and from 1821 to 1826 both LR and the Register of Shipping (RS) showed her with Maughan, master, Maitland, owner, and trade London–Batavia. They did not, however, carry any indications of repairs.

In a list of licensed ships, LR for 1821 showed Jane, Maughan, master, and Maitland, ship's husband, sailing for Batavia from London on 21 February 1820. SAD data in LL showed Jane, Maughan, master, sailing from Gravesend for Batavia on 7 February 1820. A few days later she was at Deal. Thereafter there is no mention of Jane, Maughan, master, in LL, either in the news or in the SAD data.

There is one last press mention. On 28 March 1821 she was reported to have been at Siam. She was one of several vessels that the Dutch Government had chartered to carry salt from Siam to Batavia.

== Fate ==
Jane was last listed in 1826.
