= Janee =

Janee is a feminine given name. Notable people with the name include:

- Janée Bennett, English musician
- Janee Michelle (born 1947), American actor
- Janee Munroe (1923–2006), American violinist
