= Phil Janes =

- Occupation(s): Writer and author
- Known for: Science Fiction Comedy Novels

Phil Janes is a writer and author. He has published a series of three science fiction comedy novels about interstellar space travel, in a humorous style, similar to Douglas Adams, Terry Pratchett and Grant Naylor.

He has also published an allegorical humorous novel featuring cats as its main characters, suitable for both children and adults.

His first humorous adventure novel for children aged 7 to 10 will be published by the end of July 2021, with its sequel due by the end of November 2021.

He wrote nearly 100 monthly column for "Expatriate Lifestyle" magazine published by Mongoose Press in Kuala Lumpur, and is working on several new projects.

His eponymous website, launched in November 2014, contains humorous blog posts, and reproductions of some selected monthly columns from EL Magazine.

== Publications ==
- The Pioneer Series:
  - The Galaxy Game (1993) (ISBN 1-85798-150-2) - First published by Millennium, part of the Orion Publishing Group. This book is the first in the Pioneer series and details the maiden voyage of the spaceship Pioneer. The Pioneer is built to travel to the farthest reaches of the galaxy. It soon becomes clear that things are not what they seem; the crew are but pawns in a deadly game of skill played by mega-beings so advanced that they dispensed with bodily functions, home planets, and gravity millennia ago in order to get down to the really fun stuff - manipulating lesser species for their sport.
  - Fission Impossible (1993) (ISBN 1-85798-144-8)
  - I, Arnold: Round Three of the Galaxy Game (1995) (ISBN 1-85798-101-4)
  - Tails of a Country Garden (2015) (ISBN 978-1-909477-94-0)

== Reception ==
Although he is a relatively unknown author, the books have received praise from "Publishing News," "The Dark Side," and "Nine to Five."
