= Jayne V. Armstrong =

British botanist (born 1996)

- Born: Jayne Vanessa Armstrong; 1996 (age 29–30)
- Scientific career
- Fields: Botany

Jayne Vanessa Armstrong (fl. 1996) is a British botanist who challenged the two-species taxonomy of British elms proposed by fellow Cambridge alumnus Richard Hook Richens in 1984. Armstrong in her Ph.D. thesis proposed a classification featuring 40 species, subspecies and microspecies. An introduction to her work was later published in the Botanical Journal of the Linnean Society as part of a series which was not forthcoming. However, her classification formed the basis of that adopted by Sell and Murrell in their Flora of Great Britain and Ireland, published in 2018.

== Publications ==
- Armstrong, J. V. & Sell, P. D. (1996). A revision of the British elms (Ulmus L., Ulmaceae): the historical background. Bot. J. Linn. Soc. 120: 39–50.
- Armstrong, J, Gibbs, J, Webber, J, and Brasier, C. 1997. Elm Workshop Proceedings. Elm Newsletter No. 1. April 1997. The Conservation Foundation.
