= Jayin, Iran =

Jayin جايين
- Village
- Location within Iran
- Coordinates: 28°09′00″N 56°01′48″E
- Country: Iran
- Province: Hormozgan
- County: Hajjiabad
- Bakhsh: Fareghan
- Rural District: Ashkara

Population (2006)
  - Total: 1,572
- Time zone: UTC+3:30 (IRST)
  - Summer (DST): UTC+4:30 (IRDT)

Jayin (Persian: جايين, also Romanized as Jāyīn; also known as Jāīn) is a village in Ashkara Rural District, Fareghan District, Hajjiabad County, Hormozgan Province, Iran. At the 2006 census, its population was 1,572, in 380 families.
