= Gina =

Gina or GINA may refer to:

== Gina ==
Gina may refer to:

- Gina (given name), multiple individuals
- Gina (Canaan), a town in ancient Canaan
- Arihant (Jainism), also called gina, a term for a human who has conquered his or her inner passions
- Gina (film), a Canadian drama film
- "Gina" (song), a 1962 single by Johnny Mathis
- Heorhiy Gina (1932–2025), Ukrainian musician and composer
- A nickname for the Fiat G.91 light fighter, primarily in German Air Force service

== GINA ==
GINA may refer to:

- Genetic Information Nondiscrimination Act, a bill signed into United States law in 2008 designed to restrict the use of genetic information in health insurance and employment
- BMW GINA, a prototype car by BMW
- Global Initiative for Asthma
- Global Information Network Architecture, developed in conjunction with the United States Department of Defense
- Graphical identification and authentication, dynamic-link library (DLL)
- G.I.N.A, 2022 album by Amerado

== See also ==
- Gino (disambiguation)
- Regina (disambiguation)
- Jina (disambiguation)
- GNA (disambiguation)
- JNA (disambiguation)
