= Gina Sanmiguel =

Ecuadorian politician

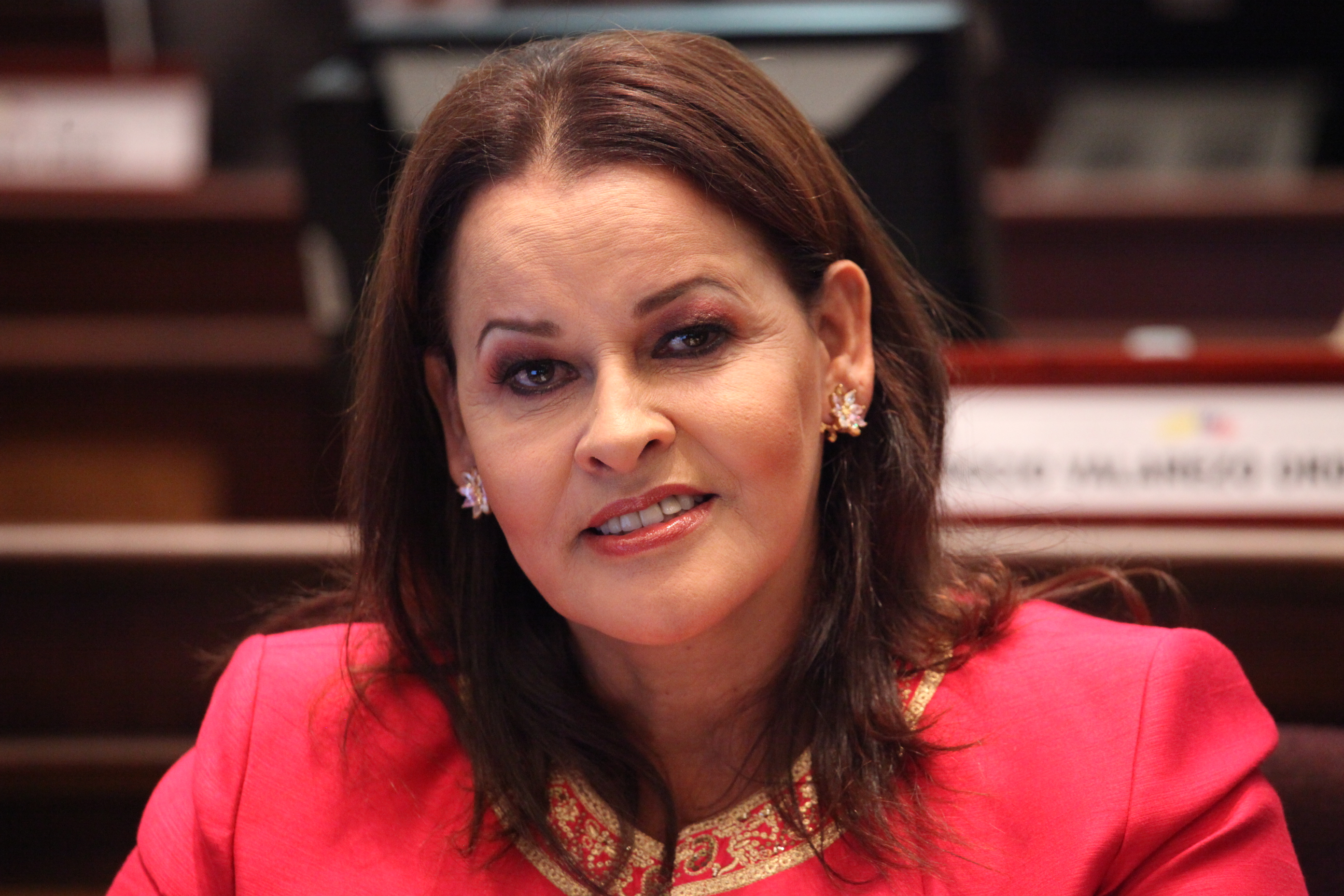
Gina Sanmiguel in 2013

Gina Zita Sanmiguel Palacios (born 1956 or 1957) is an Ecuadorian politician who served as prefect (Note: A position akin to governor.) in Napo Province, for the Social Christian Party. She would later be the first female to represent the region in the National Assembly of Ecuador, this time for PAIS Alliance.

== Biography ==
Sanmiguel was born in either 1956 or 1957. Her political career began when she was elected cantonal councillor of the city of Tena. In the 2002 Ecuadorian legislative elections, she attempted to win a seat that was sponsored by the Christian Democratic Union but the allocation of seats prevented her from being elected to the deputation despite placing second in the vote count. Two years later in the Ecuadorian regional elections, Sanmiguel was elected prefect of the Napo Province by the Social Christian Party, becoming the first woman to hold that office. Among the notable actions taken by her administration were the completion of the Coliseo Mayor, the construction of the second floor of the building of the prefecture and the creation of the Reformatory Ordinance of the symbols of the Napo Province. Sanmiguel was briefly imprisoned for her participation in protests against the regime of President Alfredo Palacio.in February 2006.

In the 2009 Ecuadorian sectional election, she attempted to get re-elected as a prefect under the auspices of the Shayari movement, but was defeated by Sergio Chacón. In the country's legislative elections held four years later, Sanmiguel was elected a national assemblyman representing the Napo Province on behalf of PAIS Alliance. However, she resigned her post that November so she could file papers to contest the mayoralty of Tena in the 2014 seasonal elections. Sanmiguel was beaten to the mayoralty by Creating Opportunities member Kléver Ron in March.
