= Roland Everett Jayne =

Methodist clergyman and biographer

Roland Everett Jayne (1886 – 31 January 1937) was a Methodist clergyman and biographer. He is noted for two biographies: Jonas Hanway: Philanthropist, Politician and Author (1929) and The Story of John Pounds, Founder of Ragged Schools (1925). He served as Methodist Minister in Portsmouth.
