= Jayna Altman =

American beauty queen

Jayna Altman is a former beauty queen who competed in the Miss International (USA) pageant.

== Biography ==
Altman won the Miss Missouri International 2008 title in a state competition. It was her first attempt at the title. She went on to represent Missouri in the Miss International 2008 pageant, which she won, in addition to winning the fitness preliminary award. She was also selected as Miss Congeniality, an award given to the delegate who most "exemplifies the spirit and grace of the pageant”, as chosen by contestant ballot vote.

== Titles ==
- Miss International (USA) 2008
- Miss Missouri International (USA) 2008

Preceded by Whitney Kudela	Miss International; 2008	Succeeded by Erin Golden
