= Jane! =

2018 single by The Long Faces

Single by the Long Faces
- Released: July 3, 2018
- Genre: Alternative rock
- Length: 3:06
- Label: NWS Music Group; Virgin
- Songwriters: Kristina Rhodes; Tom Lane; Duy Phimasset; Halden Cooke; Dan Ball
- Producers: Cooke; Ball

The Long Faces singles chronology
"Sum of My Cares" (2018)	"Jane!" (2018)	"Sail Away" (2020)

"Jane!" is a single by English alternative rock band the Long Faces about an American serial killer, Jane Toppan, released on July 3, 2018. It became a sleeper hit in 2026 after it gained traction on the video-sharing app TikTok.

== TikTok virality ==
At the beginning of 2025, an edit of the video game Dispatch set to the song began going viral on TikTok. The song was subsequently used in video edits of the anime series "Jujutsu Kaisen"; originally centering around the character Ryu Ishigori. The song then gained greater popularity in the space paired with edits of Ryu Ishigori, whom fans have satirically nicknamed "Jane Juliet" due to such edits pairing with "Jane!" and the song "Hello Juliet" by American band Clarion as a way of calling out "Larpers", a term for fans of a series who only engage with the media through internet memes.

The song has also gained popularity on platforms outside of TikTok, particularly on Instagram, where it is frequently used in fan-made "edits", especially those depicting heroic characters or actions, for example the death of JoJo’s Bizarre Adventure character Caesar Zepeli. The song has notably been featured in numerous edits related to the Amazon animated series Invincible.. Ever since The Mentalist was put on Netflix, edits of the character Patrick Jane from the show have gone viral as more people discovered The Mentalist. They use it as it correlates with the character Patrick Jane’s story throughout the show.

Furthermore, after its surge in popularity the song was added as a Jam Track for Fortnite Festival, and is set to be part of the on-disc setlist of upcoming rhythm game Stage Tour.

== Commercial performance ==
The song significantly increased in streaming due to its popularity on TikTok. According to Luminate, the song's weekly official on-demand U.S. streams rose from 590,000 for the tracking week ending on January 8, 2026, to over 2.9 million for the week ending March 26. During the first four days of the following tracking week (March 27–30), the song amassed nearly 2.3 million streams, which was a 47% gain from the equivalent period the previous week.

== Charts ==
Chart performance for "Jane!"
Chart (2026)	Peak position
UK Singles (Official Charts)	59
US Billboard Hot 100	74
US Hot Rock & Alternative Songs (Billboard)	15
