= Jain (surname) =

Jain surname is of Indian origin and is traditionally borne by followers of Jainism, an ancient religion from the Indian subcontinent. Unlike many Indian surnames that indicate specific occupations or geographic origins, "Jain" functions primarily as a community and religious identifier. It is widely found across India and within global diaspora communities in North America, Europe, and East Africa.

== Etymology ==
The surname is derived from the Sanskrit word jaina, meaning follower of a Jina.

- The root word jina translates to "conqueror" or "victor."
- This title belongs to spiritual teachers (Tirthankaras) who overcame inner passions like anger, pride, deceit, and greed.
- Adopting the surname signifies a commitment to the spiritual and ethical principles of Jainism rather than an ancestral lineage.

== Community structure ==
While "Jain" acts as a unifying surname, the community is structurally diverse, divided by regional languages, socio-economic sub-clans, and religious sects.

=== Religious divisions ===
Adherents generally belong to one of the two major sects:

- Digambara: Sky clad tradition, prominent in Central and Southern India.
- Shwetambar: White clad tradition, prominent in Western and Northern India.

=== Sub-clans and communities ===
Historically, Jains belonged to prominent mercantile and trading communities (vanyas). Many families use "Jain" interchangeably with, or alongside, their traditional clan names:

Community	Traditional Regions	Primary Sect Association
Oswal	Rajasthan, Gujarat	Predominantly Shwetambar
Agarwal	Uttar Pradesh, Haryana, Delhi	Both Digambar and Shwetambar
Khandelwal	Rajasthan, Madhya Pradesh	Predominantly Digambar
Porwal	Madhya Pradesh, Rajasthan, Gujarat	Both Digambara and Shwetambar
Chaturtha / Panchama	Maharashtra, Karnataka	Digambar

== Geographic distribution ==
The global distribution of the Jain surname spans traditional Indian strongholds and modern international diaspora hubs.

Region	High Concentration Areas	Key Characteristics
Western India	Gujarat, Maharashtra, Rajasthan	Historically the core hub for Jain merchant guilds and trade networks.
Central & Northern India	Madhya Pradesh, Uttar Pradesh, Delhi	Strong presence of agrarian and administrative Jain communities.
Southern India	Karnataka, Tamil Nadu	Ancient roots, often integrated into local linguistic traditions (Kannada/Tamil).
International Diaspora	United States, Canada, United Kingdom, East Africa	Established through 20th-century economic migration, focused in finance, technology, and medicine.

== Notable people ==
Notable people with the surname include:

- Abigail Jain, actor
- Ajit Jain (born 1951), businessman
- Anand Jain (born 1957), business executive
- Anil Jain (disambiguation), several people
- Anjli Jain (born 1981), American businesswoman
- Anshu Jain (1963–2022), British Indian financier
- Anuv Jain (born 1995), Indian singer, songwriter and composer
- Bhagchandra Jain (born 1936), scholar
- Bhavarlal Jain (1937–2016), industrialist
- BM Jain, political scientist
- Dipak C. Jain (born 1957), business educator
- Jainendra K. Jain (born 1960), physicist
- Kalyan Jain (1934–2023), Indian politician
- Kamini Jain (born 1969), Canadian Olympic kayaker
- Meenakshi Jain, Indian political scientist and historian
- Naveen Jain (born 1959), Indian-American Internet entrepreneur
- Nirmal Jain (born 1967), Indian billionaire, founder of India Infoline
- Paras Chandra Jain (1950–2026), Indian politician
- Piyare Jain (1921–2019), Indian-American physicist
- Raj Jain (born 1951), Indian-American computer science professor
- Rakesh Jain (born 1950), Indian-American tumor biologist
- Ramesh Jain (born 1949), Indian-American computer science professor
- Ravindra Jain (1944–2015), Indian music composer, lyricist and playback singer
- S. Lochlann Jain, American author and anthropologist
- Sachin H. Jain (born 1980), American physician and policy analyst
- Sanjay Jain, Indian-British economist
- Sunny Jain (born 1975), American musician
- Tarang Jain (born 1962/63), Indian billionaire businessman
