= Grodno Airport =

Grodno Airport Аэрапорт Гродна
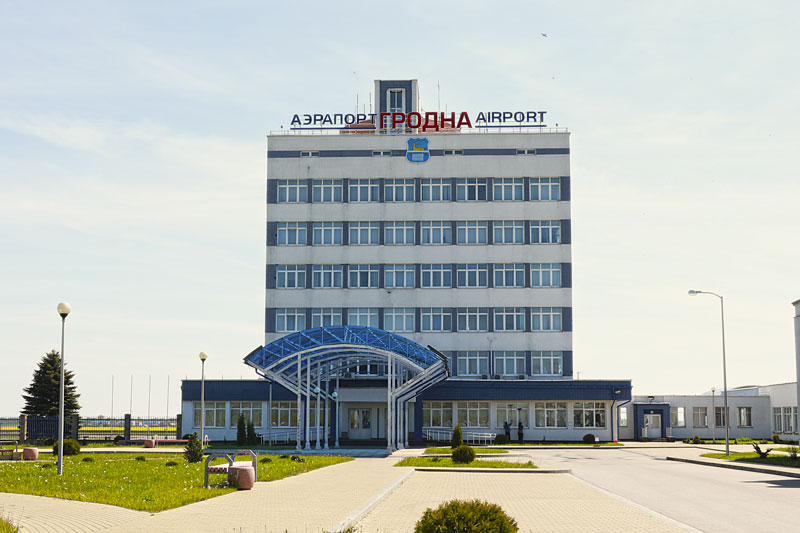
- IATA: GNA; ICAO: UMMG

Summary
- Airport type: Public
- Location: Grodno
- Elevation AMSL: 443 ft / 135 m
- Coordinates: 53°36′07″N 024°03′14″E
- Website: grodnoavia.com

Map
- Location of airport in Belarus

Runways
Direction	Length		Surface
Direction	ft	m	Surface
17/35	8,358	2,548	concrete

Grodno Airport (IATA: GNA, ICAO: UMMG) is an airport that serves Grodno, Belarus.

== History ==
The airport opened in 1984, with the first passenger flight to Moscow made in July of that year.

== Airlines and destinations ==
As of December 2021, there are no regular scheduled services at the airport.
