= Jane (surname) =

Origin
- Language: Hebrew
- Meaning: "Grace of God"

Jane is a surname, ultimately derived from the Hebrew name יוֹחָנָן, Yôḥanan, meaning "Graced by Yahweh".

== People with this surname ==
- Bob Jane (1929-2018), Australian race car driver and prominent entrepreneur and business tycoon
- Cory Jane (born 1983), New Zealand rugby union footballer
- Fred T. Jane (1865–1916), author and publisher
- Jesse Jane (born 1980), American pornographic actress and model, pseudonym of Cindy Taylor
- Joseph Jane (died 1660), British politician
- Thomas Jane (born 1969), actor

== Fictional characters ==
- Patrick Jane (born 1974), main character in The Mentalist

== See also ==
- Jane (given name)
