= Jane (1797 ship) =

British whaler 1797–1829

History

Great Britain
- Name: Jane
- Builder: Aberdeen
- Launched: 1797
- Fate: Lost 1829

General characteristics
- Tons burthen: 278 (bm)

Jane was launched in Aberdeen in 1797. She spent her entire career as a whaler in the British northern whale fishery. She was lost in 1829 in the Davis Strait.

== Career ==
Most of Jane's early career is obscure. In 1802 the Aberdeen Whaling Company purchased her. In 1810 she did come back into Aberdeen with one of the largest cargoes of whale oil brought into that port: 17 whales yielding 200 tons of oil.

Her success gave rise to the following sea shanty:

We'll go in to Jean Mackenzie's,
And buy a pint o' gin,
And drink it on the jetty
When the Jane comes in.

The following data is from Coltish:

Year	Master	Where	Whales	Tuns whale oil	Seals
1814	Newton	Greenland	20	142	0
1815	Newton	Davis Strait	5	54	0
1816	Newton	Greenland	9	73	0
1817	Newton	Greenland	0	0	0
1818	Christie	Greenland	10	122	0
1819	Christie	Greenland	3	27	0
1820	Christie	Greenland	1	11	25

A list of vessels registered in Scottish ports in 1821 reported that Jane's owner was the Union Whale Fishing Company, (aka Dundee Union Whale Fishing Co.). (Note: Curiously, this source also gives her origin as Whitby. However, the most complete book on ships built in Whitby has no listing for a Jane built before 1826, let alone in 1797.)

Lloyd's List (LL) reported on 31 July 1821 that Jane, Bruce, master, had been lost.

Year	Master	Where	Whales	Tuns whale oil	Seals
1821	Bruce	Greenland	6	110	0
1822	Bruce	Greenland	5	72	0
1823	Bruce	Davis Strait	7	106	0
1824	Bruce	Greenland	2	40	30
1825	Greenland	Bruce	0	0	0
1826	Bruce	Greenland	8	108	0
1827	Bruce	Greenland	6	86	0
1828	Bruce	Davis Strait	11	150	0
1829	Bruce	Davis Strait	0	0	0

== Fate ==
In 1829 Jane was lost in the Davis Strait. There were no casualties amongst her crew.
