= Jinnah Stadium =

Jinnah Stadium may refer to:

- Jinnah Sports Stadium, Islamabad, Pakistan
- Jinnah Stadium, Gujranwala, in Gujranwala, Punjab, Pakistan
- Jinnah Stadium, Sialkot, in Sialkot, Pakistan, formerly named Connelly Park

== See also ==
- Quaid-I-Azam Stadium (disambiguation)
