= Jinnah Hospital =

Jinnah Hospital may refer to:

Pakistan

- Jinnah Hospital, Lahore
- Jinnah Hospital, Karachi
- Jinnah Hospital, Islamabad
- Jinnah Hospital, Mirpur

Afghanistan

- Jinnah Hospital, Kabul
