= Jayne Fenton Keane =

Australian experimental poet

Jayne Fenton Keane is a contemporary Australian poet and poetry performer. She is known for making innovative use of multimedia including Adobe Flash, for publishing her poetry on the web, and for poetry performance.

== Early life and education ==
Keane was born in the United Kingdom. At age one, she emigrated to Australia with her parents, Leslie and Linda Fenton.

Keane was educated at Griffith University, completing a BA (Hons) with her thesis, "Slamming the sonnet", and a PhD, with "Three-dimensional poetic natures". She completed a second PhD, "The Language of Ecotourism", at the University of Southern Queensland.

== Career ==
Keane has published several books of poetry and a CD recording. She is active as a performance poet and in multimedia poetry. The Transparent Lung was adapted for radio in collaboration with Mike Ladd. Keane has received a Varuna Writers' Centre Fellowship and a grant from Queensland Arts, and has performed at festivals in Australia, Canada and the United States. She is the founding and current director of National Poetry Week.

=== Reception of work ===
Liz Hall-Downs described The Transparent Lung as "intensely 'modern'", and compares Keane's progression as a poet from her previous work Ophelia's Codpiece to The Transparent Lung to Sylvia Plath's progression, noting the clarity of words and emotional directness.

== Works ==
Poetry

- Fissure Blooms (1994) ISBN 0-646-20976-0
- Torn (Plateau, 2000)
- Ophelia's Codpiece (Post Pressed, 2002) ISBN 1-876682-23-X
- The Transparent Lung (Post Pressed, 2003) ISBN 1-876682-51-5
- Nel with Cat, an ekphrastic poem for Nel Bonte

CD

- The Stalking Tongue (1999)
