= Jinnahbhai Poonja =

Businessman and father of Muhammad Ali Jinnah (1850–1902)

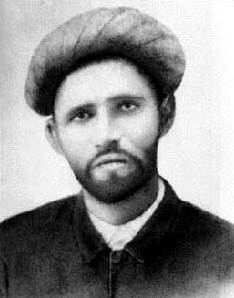
- Born: c. 1850-1860; Paneli Moti, British India
- Died: 15 April 1902 (aged 51–52); Karachi, British India
- Occupation: Businessman
- Organizations: Jinnahbhai & Co.; Graham's Shipping and Trading Company
- Spouse: Mithibhai Jinnah
- Children: 7
- Relatives: See Jinnah family

Jinnahbhai Poonja (c. 1850 – 15 April 1902) was a British Indian merchant. He was the founder and chairman of Jinnahbhai & Co. and Graham's Shipping and Trading Company. He was the father of Muhammad Ali Jinnah, the founder of Pakistan, and political activist Fatima Jinnah.

== Early and personal life ==
Jinnahbhai Poonja was born in Paneli Moti, a small village in Gondal State (present-day Gujarat), to a Khoja family. Jinnahbhai had two brothers, Valji and Nathoo, and one sister, Manbai. He was born around the time of the Indian Rebellion of 1857, which marked a pivotal moment in subcontinental history by solidifying Crown rule in India.

In 1874, Poonja married Mithibhai, a fellow Khoja from Dhaffa, a nearby village in Kathiawar. The couple eventually had 8 children: Mahomedali, Ahmed Ali, Bunde Ali, Rahmat Bai, Shireen Bai, Maryam Bai Jinnah, Fatima, and Bachu (died in infancy).

Poonja taught himself English, later teaching his children how to read and write English. He also became fluent in Persian after interactions with Afghan merchants from Kandahar who came to Karachi. Poonja's native language was Gujarati.

According to Indian author and historian D.N. Panigrahi, Poonja's ancestors, despite their Khoja affiliation, were significantly influenced by Hindu traditions, including pujas such as Chatti. Panigrahi goes on to state that Poonja's father, Poonja Meghji, gave Hindu names to all of his children. However, Jinnahbhai Poonja was a devout Muslim and abandoned these Hindu traditions, raising his children in a more conservative Islamic manner, teaching his children the Quran and giving them all Muslim names.

== Business career ==
Most of Paneli Moti were agriculturalists; however Poonja's ancestors had a handloom business. Premjibhai Meghji Thakkar father of Jinnahbhai Poonja entered dry fish trade business. He was from Lohana caste, a Hindu merchant community that strictly practised vegetarianism. Engaging in the fish trade was viewed as a massive religious and social violation. Poonja's brothers worked alongside their father, but this way of life did not attract Poonja, who wanted to become a businessman. Poonja left for Gondal, where he started his private trading business with much success.

=== Legal issues ===
By the time Mahomedali went to England, Poonja's wife Mithibai had died. Poonja was in debt to numerous businesses and faced with several legal battles. Poonja described to Mahomedali that "all my dreams have come tumbling down," and he moved his family to Bombay in 1893, where Mahomedali began to take care of his family's expenses instead of Poonja.

== Death ==
Poonja died on 15 April 1902. Jinnah, now legally renamed to Muhammad Ali, would move to Bombay as a barrister and to support his family. Jinnah would go on to be one of the most notable subcontinental political leaders of the 20th century through his creation of an independent state of Pakistan.

== See also ==
- Isma'ilism
- Shia Islam
