= Jina (Korean name) =

Jina and Jinah are Roman-alphabet spellings of two homophonous Korean given names with different hangul spellings 지나 and 진아.

People with this name include:

- Shim Yi-young (born Kim Jin-ah, 1980), South Korean actress
- Kang Jin-a (born 1981), South Korean film director
- Lee Jin-a (born 1985), South Korean tennis player
- Nana (entertainer) (born Im Jin-ah, 1991), South Korean singer, member of girl group After School
- Lee Jin-ah (born 1991), South Korean singer
- Kwon Jin-ah (born 1997), South Korean singer and guitarist
- Song Ji-na (born 1959), South Korean screenwriter
- Choi Ji-na (born 1975), South Korean actress
- G.NA, (born Gina Jane Choi, 1987), Korean Canadian singer
- Tae Jin-ah, South Korean singer
- Won Jin-ah, South Korean actress

== See also ==
- List of Korean given names
