= GNA =

GNA may refer to:

== Places ==
- Hrodna Airport (IATA airport code: GNA), serving Grodna, Belarus
- Manuel Carlos Piar Guayana Airport (VORTAC: GNA; NDB: GNA), Ciudad Guayana, Venezuela

== Organizations ==
- Gna!, an association of software developers, and open source site
- Argentine National Gendarmerie (Spanish: Gendarmería Nacional Argentina)
- Gambia National Army
- Ghana News Agency, a state-owned news agency
- GNA University, in Phagwara, Punjab, India
- Government of National Accord, an interim government for Libya
- Army of the GNA, the Turkish land forces during the Turkish War of Independence

== Other uses ==
- G.NA (born 1987), Canadian singer
- Gná, a goddess in Norse mythology
- Glycol nucleic acid, a nucleic acid
- Kaansa language (ISO 639-3 gna), a Gur language of Burkina Faso

== See also ==
- GNAS (disambiguation)
- Gina (disambiguation)
