= Paneli Moti =

Village in Gujarat state, India

Paneli Moti is a village in Upleta, a tehsil in the Rajkot district of Gujarat, India. It is best known for being the ancestral village of the founders of Pakistan, Muhammad Ali Jinnah and Fatima Jinnah, as their father, Jinnahbhai Poonja, was born there.
