= Quaid-e-Azam Residency =

Historic building in Ziarat, Balochistan, Pakistan

Coordinates: 30°22′50.64″N 67°43′45″E

- اقامتگاه قائدِ اعظم (Urdu)
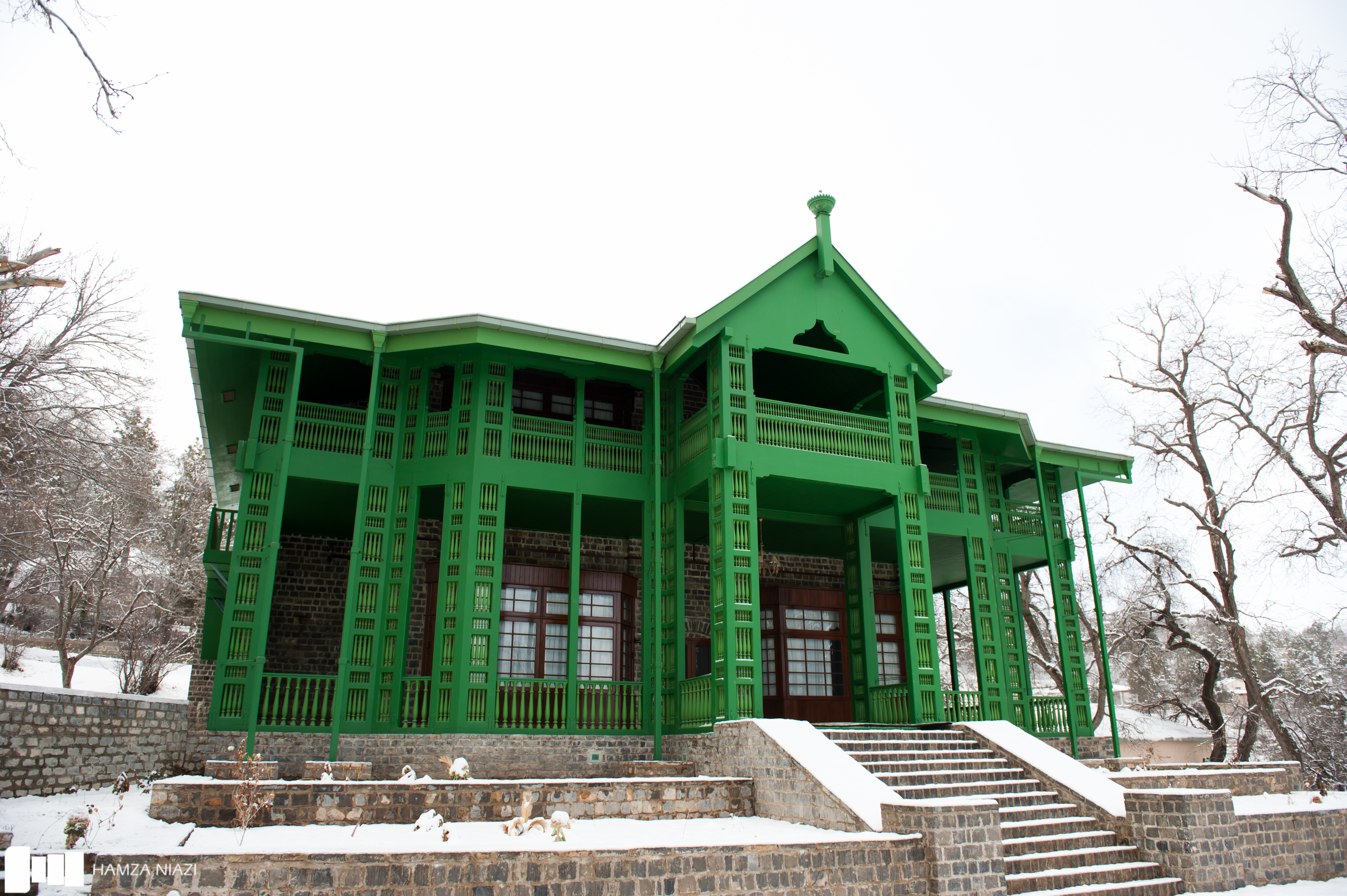
- Quaid e Azam Residency, Ziarat, Pakistan

- Location within Balochistan, Pakistan Location within Pakistan
- Location: Ziarat, Balochistan, Pakistan

History
- Built: 1892

Site notes
- Architectural style: Wooden structure

Quaid-e-Azam Residency (Urdu: اقامتگاه قائدِ اعظم), also known as the Ziarat Residency, is a 19th-century wooden building located in the hill station of Ziarat in Balochistan, Pakistan. Constructed in 1892 during the British India, the two-storey structure is best known as the place where the founder of Pakistan, Muhammad Ali Jinnah, spent the last months of his life in 1948. The building is a wooden structure, originally designed as a sanatorium before being converted into the summer residence of the agent of the Governor General. It is declared a heritage site and is of great architectural importance.

== History ==
=== Construction and colonial use ===
The Residency was built by the British in 1892 as part of the development of Ziarat, an alpine hamlet in Balochistan situated at an elevation of about 2,400 metres above sea level and surrounded by ancient juniper forests. Originally intended as a sanatorium, the building's arid and dry mountain setting was considered suitable for the treatment of pulmonary ailments. It was subsequently adapted as the summer residence of the Agent to the Governor-General of Balochistan and used by British officers seeking respite from the summer heat of Quetta and Sibi.

=== Jinnah's stay in 1948 ===
Following the creation of Pakistan in 1947, Muhammad Ali Jinnah assumed office as the country's first Governor-General. In mid-1948, his long-concealed tuberculosis had progressed sharply, and on the advice of his doctors he was moved from Karachi to Quetta on 6 July 1948 and shortly afterwards to the higher retreat of Ziarat. He resided at the Residency alongside his sister and companion Fatima Jinnah, who occupied the room facing his own on the upper floor. During his stay, tests carried out by Colonel Ilahi Bakhsh and other physicians confirmed a diagnosis of tuberculosis and advanced lung cancer.

Jinnah continued to conduct official business from Ziarat, receiving despatch boxes marked "M.A.J." from Karachi and holding meetings in the sitting room and on the front lawn. His visitors during this period included the first Prime Minister Liaquat Ali Khan and Cabinet Secretary Chaudhry Muhammad Ali. On 13 August 1948, on the eve of the first anniversary of Pakistan's independence, Jinnah was moved to the lower altitude of Quetta and thereafter flown to Karachi on 11 September 1948, where he died the same evening.

After partition, the Residency was converted into a museum and declared a national monument. The building has appeared on Pakistan's 100-rupee note since 2006.

== Property damage ==
On 29 October 2008, at around 4 am, Ziarat and surrounding areas were struck by an earthquake doublet. The first tremor, 6.2 magnitude, lasted a couple of seconds, and was followed by a magnitude-6.4 tremor that lasted almost 30 seconds, destroying many mud houses, several government buildings and neighbouring houses. The residency was also damaged during the 2008 earthquake.

On 15 June 2013, the Residency was targeted with rockets. The wooden parts of the building were badly affected as a result of the attack. Militants belonging to BLA claimed responsibility. It was badly damaged as a result of the intense attack. However, the government of Pakistan vowed to restore the site. However, despite the wooden structure being badly damaged in the 2013 attack, the concrete structure was standing and the photographs along with the other artifacts were safe and sound.

== Rehabilitation ==
The reconstruction work completed by builder Nayyer Ali Dada and the rehabilitated Ziarat Residency opened on August 14, 2014, by then Prime Minister Nawaz Sharif. The building is now open for all to visit it.

== Depictions ==
The Quaid-e-Azam Residency has appeared on the 100-rupee note since 2006.

== See also ==
- Jinnah family
- Mazar-e-Quaid
- Quaid-e-Azam House
- Wazir Mansion
- Jinnah House
- Governor House, Quetta
