= Quaid-e-Azam House =

Museum in Karachi, Pakistan

- مکان قائدِ اعظم
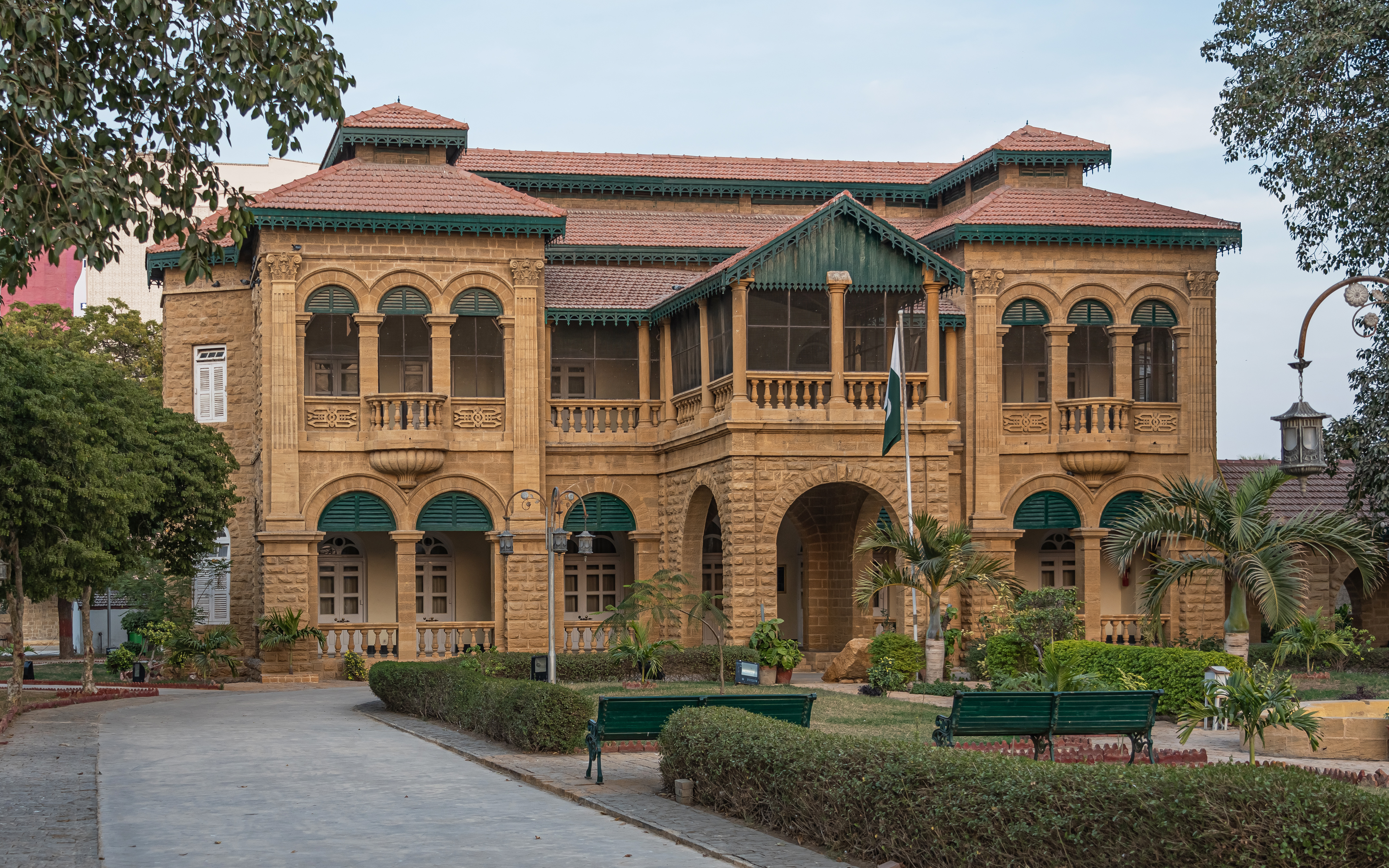
- Alternative names: Flagstaff House

General information
- Type: House museum
- Location: Karachi, Pakistan, Pakistan
- Coordinates: 24°51′04″N 67°01′58″E
- Owner: Government of Pakistan

Technical details
- Material: Gizri sandstone

Design and construction
- Architect: Moses Somake

The Quaid-e-Azam House, also known as Flagstaff House, is a house museum dedicated to the personal life of Muhammad Ali Jinnah, the founder of Pakistan. Located in Karachi, Sindh, Pakistan, it was designed by British architect Moses Somake.

This is the former residence of Jinnah, who lived there from 1944 until his death in 1948. His sister, Fatima Jinnah lived there until 1964. It was bought by Jinnah in 1943 at the cost of 115,000 British Indian rupees. The building was later acquired in 1985 by the Pakistani government and converted to a museum.

== Museum of Jinah ==
In 1984, it was converted into the Flagstaff House Museum of great Jinnah.

== See also ==
- Jinnah family
- Wazir Mansion, Jinnah's birthplace in Karachi
- South Court, Muhammad Ali Jinnah's former residence in Mumbai, India, currently owned by the government of India.
- Muhammad Ali Jinnah House, Jinnah's former House at 10 Dr APJ Abdul Kalam Road, New Delhi, currently the Dutch Embassy in India.
- Quaid-e-Azam Residency in Ziarat, where Jinnah spent the last days of his life
