= Jinnah House =

South Court Mansion

General information
- Type: Bungalow
- Architectural style: Indo-Saracenic
- Location: Mumbai, Maharashtra, India, 2, Bhausaheb Hirey Marg, Malabar Hill, Mumbai
- Coordinates: 18.9532°N 72.8014°E
- Current tenants: Unoccupied
- Construction started: 1936
- Owner: Government of India

Design and construction
- Architect: Claude Batley

South Court Mansion, also known as the Jinnah House, is an unoccupied house in Malabar Hill, a premium neighbourhood of the city of Mumbai in India associated with Muhammad Ali Jinnah, the founder and first governor-general of Pakistan, and his family. It was built by Jinnah and remained his main residence for 10 years until he left in 1946 for Karachi.

== History ==
The bungalow was built by Muhammad Ali Jinnah in 1936 at a then exorbitant price of 2 Lakh (200,000) rupees. This was after Jinnah returned to Bombay from England to take charge of the Muslim League. The bungalow is located at 2, Bhausaheb Hirey Marg in Malabar Hill, South Mumbai. It is situated near the current residence of the Chief Minister of Maharashtra. Jinnah lived in the house till Partition of India in 1947, after which he moved to Karachi in Pakistan. Jinnah also had a bungalow in Delhi on Dr APJ Abdul Kalam Road which he later sold to his friend and businessman Ramakrishna Dalmia of the Dalmia Group, just before the partition. The house in Delhi was later purchased by the Government of Netherlands and currently houses the Dutch Consulate.

Designed by architect Claude Batley in the European-style architecture, the sea-facing palatial bungalow was constructed using exquisite Italian marble and walnut woodwork. Specially imported Italian stonemasons were employed for its construction with Jinnah personally supervising the construction "brick by brick". The property encompasses an area of 10,000 square metres (2.5 acres). The bungalow, with its pointed arches and impressive columns, is currently in a dilapidated state, and much of the walnut panelling has rotted.

During 1941, it was speculated that the house was to be sold to the Dalmia family for 20 Lakh rupees. Upon receiving a query by his daughter Dina Wadia on this, Jinnah himself dismissed this purported sale as "wild rumour".

The historic building was also the venue for the watershed talks on the partition of India in September 1944 between Jinnah and Mahatma Gandhi. On 15 August 1946, exactly a year before India gained independence, another round of talks was held here between Jinnah and Jawaharlal Nehru.

Currently the property is owned by the government of India. Dina Wadia, Jinnah's daughter who married an Indian and settled in India after the partition, had been involved in litigation regarding the house claiming that Hindu law is applicable to Jinnah as he was a Khoja Shia Muslim.

== Bungalow inhabitants ==
Jinnah was extremely attached to his house. After the partition of India in 1947, Mumbai remained a part of India and Jinnah left his abode as he became the Governor General of Pakistan. He requested Nehru, the then Indian Prime Minister to allot his house to any foreign consulate, preferably European, as he wished it to be given to a European family who would appreciate the architecture. Nehru acceded to Jinnah's request and offered him a monthly rent of three thousand rupees. Unfortunately, Jinnah died in September 1948 before the deal could be finalised.

As a personal favour to Jinnah, Nehru did not declare the property an Enemy Property. In 1955, in a Cabinet speech he suggested it be given to the Government of Pakistan, but could not gain the sanction of the Cabinet. Though India's Foreign minister and the Indian High Commission suggested that the bungalow be handed over to Pakistan in 1956, the suggestion was not taken up.

The premises were leased to the British High Commission as the residence of the Deputy High Commissioner from 1948 to 1983. The first floor of the building also held the offices of senior Commission officials. It remained vacant until 2003, when a part of it was given to the Indian Council for Cultural Relations to be used for cultural activities. In March 2005, India's Minister of State for External Affairs, E. Ahamed reiterated that the house would remain a cultural centre.

== Ownership dispute ==
Pakistan had since 1979 requested that India sell the property, or at least lease it to its government as a tribute to its founder in order to convert it into their Consulate. Though P. V. Narasimha Rao, India's foreign minister in 1980, agreed in principle to lease Jinnah House as the residence of local Consulate-General of Pakistan, the plan was never realised.

During his visit to India, then Pakistani President Pervez Musharraf had suggested to the then Indian Prime Minister Atal Bihari Vajpayee that the house be given to Pakistan so that it could be turned into a consulate. Talks in June 2004 between the foreign ministers of the two countries over the land did not gain any guarantees from India.

In May 2005, Pakistan High Commission officials were shown around various properties in Mumbai and its suburbs for the setting up of its consulate but not the Jinnah House. Indian government sources say that the claim by the Jinnah's heirs will be treated "sympathetically", and have no intention of handing it to Pakistan.

Dina Wadia, the only child of Jinnah, was involved in litigation regarding Jinnah House claiming that Hindu Law is applicable to Jinnah as he was a Khoja Shia.

It was also campaigned to make Jinnah House, India-Pakistan Friendship Centre by a group of peace activists from Mumbai and Karachi.

== See also ==
- Jinnah family
- Central Wakf Council
- Custodian for Enemy Property for India
- Evacuee Trust Property Board
