= Corps Commander House, Lahore =

Official residence of the Corps Commander, Lahore

- Alternative names: Jinnah House, Lahore

General information
- Location: Bungalow No. 53, Lahore Cantonment, Lahore, Punjab, Pakistan
- Coordinates: 31.5291°N 74.3805°E
- Completed: 1943; 83 years ago
- Owner: Mohan Lal Bashin (until 1943); Muhammad Ali Jinnah (1943–1948); Pakistan Army (1948-present)

Website
- lcb.gov.pk

The Corps Commander House, Lahore, (Urdu: کور کمانڈر ہاؤس لاہور), also known as Jinnah House, is a historical bungalow in Lahore Cantonment. It is the official residence of the Lahore Corps Commander.

== Background ==
Corps Commander House, Lahore was originally owned by Mohan Lal Bashin.

During the British rule, the British Indian Army acquired the property on rent for a symbolic five rupees per month under the Defence of India Rules. In 1943, Muhammad Ali Jinnah acquired the property from Mohan Lal Bashin. After Jinnah purchased the house, he engaged in correspondence with the British military officials for over a year, seeking to reclaim his property and objecting to the changes made to the building. Despite the efforts of mediators appointed by the Punjab's Secretary of Interior, it remains unclear whether Jinnah successfully vacated the house or increased the rent to his desired amount of 700 rupees.

As the partition of India approached, the British Indian Army informed Jinnah of their decision to vacate the bungalow by August 31, 1947, upon learning of his appointment as the first Governor-General of Pakistan. However, due to personal engagements, Jinnah could not take possession of the house, and the lease was extended until January 31, 1948.

Jinnah died in 1948. Following his death, the property was handed over to his representative Syed Maratib Ali, the father of Syed Babar Ali, in January 1948, having previously been requisitioned by the British Army. Later, in the same year, the Pakistan Army reasserted control over the property, offering a monthly rent of Rs 500 to his sisters, Fatima Jinnah and Shireen Jinnah.

In 1959, during the presidency of Muhammad Ayub Khan, the house was sold to the Armed Forces of Pakistan for three and a half lakh rupees, with the proceeds deposited into the Jinnah Trust Fund. Since then, the property serves as the official residence for the Corps Commander of Lahore.

== Issues ==
=== Ownership dispute ===
In 2007, the Federal Board of Revenue unearthed historical documentation revealing that Mohammed Ali Jinnah, the founder of Pakistan, once owned the Corps Commander House in Lahore. The revelation ignited a dispute between the military and civilian administrations, as the army staunchly resisted relinquishing their entitlement to the property.

According to the Pakistan Army, the property was acquired by them from Fatima Jinnah, Mohammed Ali Jinnah's sister, for Rs. 350,000.

=== Damage on 9 May 2023 ===
On 9 May 2023, Imran Khan was arrested, stirring nationwide violence. During the ensuing violence, the building and its contents were damaged. The official government and the ex-Prime Minister claims of the causes and culprits behind the violence are in disagreement with each other.

According to a press release from Inter-Services Public Relations, the media wing of Pakistan Army, Khan's arrest was legal. However, the Supreme Court of Pakistan declared Khan's arrest illegal, ruling that it was invalid due to the manner in which it was carried out—by paramilitary forces seizing him from within the court premises, which the judges deemed a violation of judicial sanctity.

In an interview with Fareed Zakaria, the former prime minister Imran Khan claimed that the incident of damages, arson and violence were a reaction and possibly a conspiracy. In various other video presentations, he also claimed that security apparatus was also involved in the incitement if not carrying out of the arson and violence.
