= Wadia (disambiguation) =

The Wadia family is a prominent Parsi Indian family.

Wadia may also refer to:

== Companies ==
- Wadia Ghandy & Company, an Indian law firm
- Wadia Group, an Indian conglomerate
- Wadia Movietone, defunct Indian film production company

== People ==
- Ardaseer Cursetjee (1808–1877)
- Bahman Pestonji Wadia
- Darashaw Nosherwan Wadia (1883–1969)
- Lovji Nusserwanjee Wadia (1702–1774)
- Neville Wadia (1911–1996)
- Dina Wadia (1919–2017)
- Nusli Wadia (born 1944)
- Ness Wadia (born 1970)
- Jehangir Wadia (born 1973)
- Jim Wadia (born 1947)
- Spenta R. Wadia (born 1950), Indian theoretical physicist

== Places ==
- Wadia (village), a village in Gujarat
