= Ness Wadia =

Indian businessman

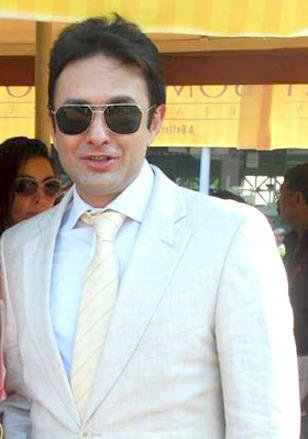
- Wadia at the C.N. Wadia Cup in 2011
- Born: Ness Nusli Wadia; 30 May 1971 (age 55); Mumbai, Maharashtra, India
- Education: Tufts University; University of Warwick
- Occupation: Businessman
- Father: Nusli Wadia
- Family: Wadia family; Jinnah family

Ness Nusli Wadia (born 30 May 1971) is an Indian businessman. Wadia is the managing director of Bombay Burmah Trading Corporation, a company which has holdings in most of the Wadia Group subsidiaries, including an indirect majority stake in Britannia Industries. He was the Joint Managing Director of Bombay Dyeing, the flagship company of the Wadia Group, till March 2011 when he stepped down from the post. Wadia is a co-owner of the Indian Premier League cricket team Punjab Kings.

== Early life ==
Ness Nusli Wadia was born into a Parsi family in Mumbai, India. His parents are businessman Nusli Wadia and former airhostess Maureen Wadia. He has a younger brother, businessman Jehangir Wadia. He is the grandson of businessman Neville Wadia and his wife, Dina Wadia. His grandfather Neville was the son of Sir Ness Wadia who played an important role in turning the city of Bombay into one of the worlds largest cotton gin trading centers during the late 19th century, while his grandmother Dina was the only child of Muhammad Ali Jinnah, the founding father and the first Governor General of Pakistan, and his wife Rattanbai Petit was a member of the Petit family.

After completing his education at The Cathedral & John Connon School as well as Lawrence School in Himachal Pradesh, and then at Millfield School in the UK. Wadia studied international relations at Tufts University near Boston, Massachusetts, and then went on to do his MSc in Engineering Management at University of Warwick.

== Career ==
Wadia joined Bombay Dyeing in 1993 as a management trainee. During his earlier period he was closely involved in marketing and retail distribution of the textile division of the company and was active in various organisations such as the Cotton Textiles Export Promotion Council (TEXPROCIL) (a council he once chaired), Mill Owners’ Association (MOA), Associated Chambers of Commerce & Industry of India, etc.

In 1998, he took a leave of absence to complete his master's degree in Science of Engineering Business Management from the University of Warwick with a thesis titled "Leading to Success in India". After receiving his master's degree in 2001, he returned as Deputy Managing Director of Bombay Dyeing and was later promoted to Joint Managing Director. He was appointed to this position on 1 August 2001 and stayed till March 2011, when he stepped down, and younger brother Jehangir was made managing director. Ness was appointed Managing Director of Bombay Burmah Trading Corporation.

In 1998, 1999 and 2000 he was appointed on the Prime Minister’s Council on Trade & Industry and in September 1998 was appointed the Convenor of the Special Group Task Force on Food and Agro Industries Management Policy in September, 1998.

Ness Wadia currently serves as Managing Director of Bombay Burmah Trading Company Limited and Chairman of National Peroxide Limited. He also serves as Director on Boards of various Wadia Group companies such as Britannia Industries, Bombay Dyeing, GoAir and Wadia Techno Engineering Services. He sits on the Audit Committees of GoAir, Britannia, Bombay Burmah, and NPL; the Finance Committees of Bombay Dyeing, Bombay Burmah, and Britannia; and also the CSR Committees of Bombay Dyeing and Britannia. He is actively involved in the overseeing the award-winning Wadia Hospitals in addition to the Group’s educational establishments under Modern Education Society (MES) Trust.

In 2008, along with actress Preity Zinta and businessman Mohit Burman, Wadia acquired ownership rights for the Mohali-based Twenty20 cricket team of the Indian Premier League (IPL). The group paid $76 million to acquire the franchise, and named the team Kings XI (Eleven) Punjab, later on changed to Punjab Kings.

== Board positions ==
Wadia has served as Managing Director of Bombay Burmah Trading Company Limited. Wadia has been a trustee of Sir Ness Wadia Foundation, and other charitable trusts within the Wadia family, and a board member of Wadia Hospitals.

== Personal life ==
Wadia dated Bollywood actress Preity Zinta from February 2005 until 2009, and the couple were subject to intense media scrutiny.

His name was later linked to actress Ameesha Patel. The two reportedly met at a popular gym, became friends, and eventually started dating. According to some reports, Ness often sent gifts to Ameesha during their relationship.

On 13 June 2014, Zinta filed a complaint with the Mumbai police against Wadia alleging he had molested and abused her at an IPL match at the Wankhede Stadium in Mumbai on 30 May.

He was sentenced to two years in jail for possession of 25 gm of cannabis resin in 2019 by a Japanese court which was suspended for five years.

Wadia helped the state of Sikkim by donating supplies during COVID-19 pandemic. He has been noted to be supportive of the LGBTQ community.
