= Bombay Dockyard (Royal Navy) =

His Majesty's Indian Naval Dockyard, Bombay
- Bombay in India

Site information
- Type: Naval Base and Naval Dockyard
- Operator: Royal Navy
- Controlled by: Navy Board, Board of Admiralty

Site history
- In use: 1670–1949

Garrison information
- Occupants: East India Marine; Bombay Marine; Royal Navy East Indies Squadron; Royal Indian Navy

Bombay Dockyard, or formally His Majesty's Indian Dockyard, Bombay, was originally a naval facility developed by the East India Company beginning in 1670. It was formally established as a Royal Navy Dockyard in 1811 and base of the East Indies Station when the Department of Admiralty in London took over it. The yard was initially managed by the Navy Board through its Resident Commissioner, Bombay until 1832 when administration of the yard was taken over by the Board of Admiralty.

After the Independence of India the dockyard was taken over by the Indian Navy.

== History ==
Britain's representation in the East Indies was dominated by the English East India Company formed in 1600. The company created its own navy as early as 1613 and became known as the East India Marine and equipment for building ships at Bombay was sent directly from England. Around 1670, Bombay began to be developed as a shipyard, and by 1686, it had become the headquarters of the English East India Company and its fleet in India was renamed the Bombay Marine. To support the Bombay Marine, a refit yard was built with a supporting shore organisation consisting of a marine storekeeper, Mr. William Minchen, who was appointed in 1670, and a master shipbuilder, Mr. Warwick Pett. The structure followed that of other Royal Navy Dockyards such as those in England where in the early 17th century the naval storekeeper and master shipwright were key posts. The development in the administrative structure was notable for the combination of shore and ship establishments.

In 1735 by the East India Company, brought in shipwrights from their base at Surat in order to construct vessels using Malabar teak. One of their number, Lovji Nusserwanjee Wadia, was (along with several generations of his descendants) a key figure in the success of the Yard, as indicated in The New Cambridge History of India: Science, Technology and Medicine in Colonial India. In 1742 a post of Superintendent of the Bombay Marine was created along with a Commodore, Bombay Marine and seven other commanders. The superintendent controlled the dockyard with the commodore reporting to him, a purser of the marine being in charge of accounts, a master builder, and storekeeper in charge of their departments. Additionally in 1742 a Bombay Marine Board was established to administer the dockyard consisting of the superintendent, the commodore and two senior captains as the facilities customers, and the superintendent’s deputy, the master attendant.

In the first decade of the 19th century the Department of Admiralty in London gradually took over responsibility for the yard, and day to administration of the yard passed from the superintendent to the Navy Boards, Resident Commissioner, Bombay, who continued working with the Wadia family as Master Shipwrights. There was much construction on the site around this time. Duncan Dock, which was the largest dry dock outside Europe at the time, was constructed in 1807–1810, and remains in use today. The main Dockyard building, which fronts onto Shahid Bhagat Singh Road, dates from 1807, as does the administration block. In 1832 the Navy Board was abolished and responsibility for the management of the yard passed to the Board of Admiralty.

The nearby Great Western Building (formerly Admiralty House) had housed the Port Admiral from around 1764–1792.

== Administration of the Dockyard ==
=== Superintendent Bombay Marine ===
Included:

- 1794–1801: Captain Philip Dundas.
- 1802–1804: Captain Robert Anderson.
- 1805–1808: Captain William Taylor Money. (remained superintendent until 1810).
- Post not recorded

=== Resident Commissioner, Bombay ===
==== Naval Storekeeper, Bombay ====
Included:

- 1794: James Moseley.
- 1796–1801: Philip Dundas.
- 1801–1807: Simon Halliday.
- 1807–1808: De Souza
- 1808–1810: William Taylor Money.
- 1810–1811: Hamilton.
- 1811–1816: Charles Northcoate.

==== Master Shipwright, Bombay ====
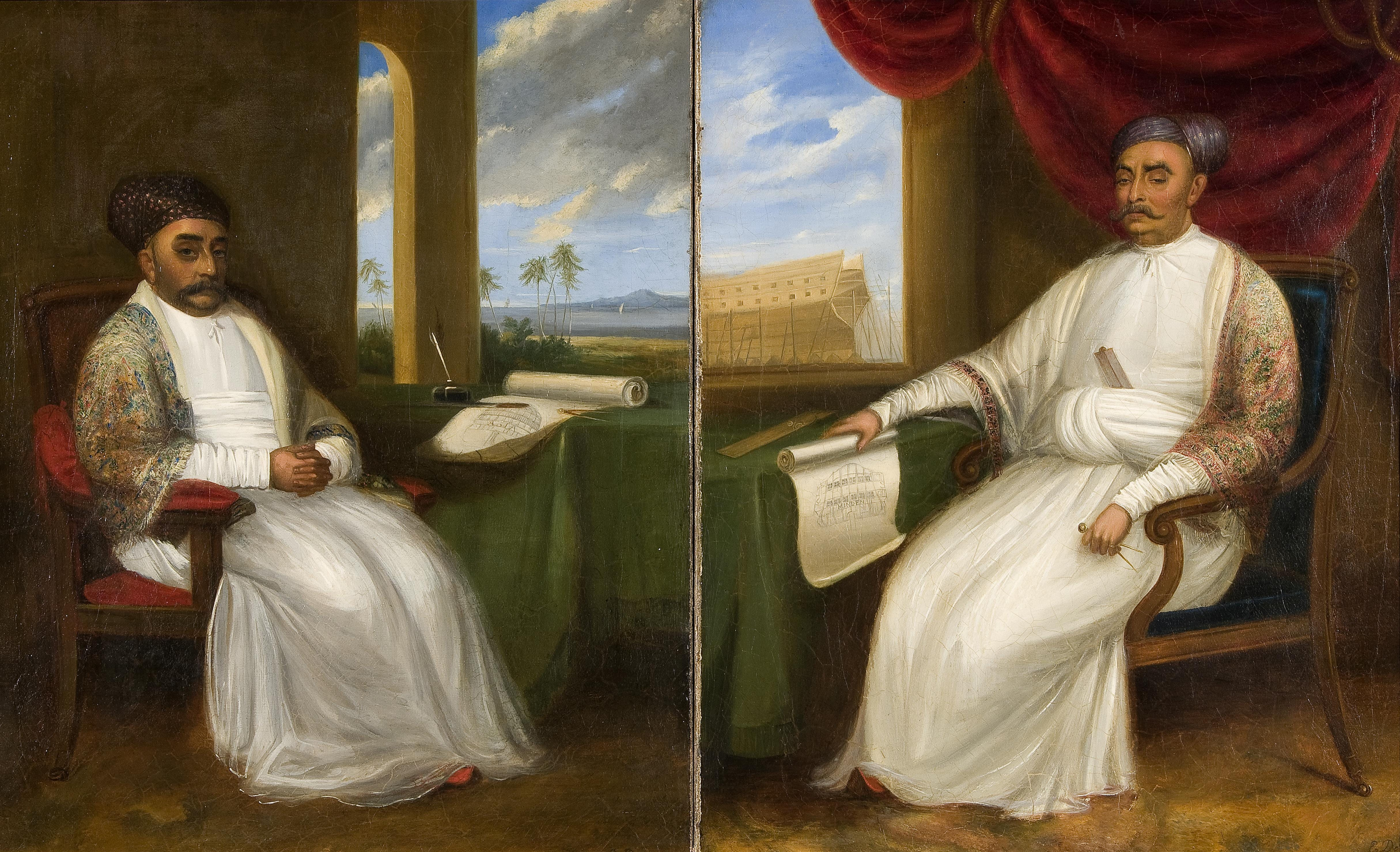
Nourojee Jamsetjee Wadia (1774–1860) and Jamsetjee Bomanjee Wadia (1756–1821), shipbuilders

Included:

- 1670: Warwick Pett.
- 1736–1774: Lovji Nusserwanjee Wadia.
- 1774–1792: Maneckjee Lowjee Wadia and Bomanjee Lowjee Wadia (1774–1790, joint)
- 1792–1804: Framjee Maneckjee Wadia and Jamsetjee Bomanjee Wadia (1792–1821, joint)
- 1821–1844: Nowrojee Jamsetjee Wadia.
- 1844–1857: Gursetjee Rustomjee Wadia.
- 1857–1866: Jehangir Nowrojee Wadia.
- 1866–1884: Jamsetjee Duhunjibhoy Wadia.

===== Assistant Master Shipwright, Bombay =====
- 1821–1840: Ardaseer Cursetjee Wadia.

==== Master Builder, Bombay ====
- 1814–1821: Joseph Seaton. (transferred from Deptford Dockyard).

==== Chief Inspector of Machinery, Bombay ====
- 1841–1857: Ardaseer Cursetjee Wadia.

== Bibliography ==
- Admiralty, Great Britain (1823). The Navy List. London: H.M. Stationery Office.
- Arnold, David (2004), The New Cambridge History of India: Science, Technology and Medicine in Colonial India, Cambridge University Press, ISBN 0521563194.
- Day, John Frederick. (April 2012) 'British Admiralty Control and Naval Power in the Indian Ocean (1793-1815) (Volume 1 of 2)'. Submitted as a thesis for the degree of Doctor of Philosophy in Maritime History, University of Exeter.
- Harrison, Simon (2010–2018). "Master Shipwright at Bombay Dockyard". threedecks.org. S. Harrison. Retrieved 3 September 2019.
- Low, Charles Rathbone (2012). History of the Indian Navy 1613-1863 Volume I. Luton, England.: Andrews UK Limited. ISBN 9781781501672.
- Wadia, Ruttonjee Ardeshir (1955). Bombay Dockyard And The Wadia Master Builders. Bombay, India: R. A. Wadia.
