= Bombay Burmah Trading Corporation =

Indian trading company

The Bombay Burmah Trading Corporation Limited
- Type: Public
- Traded as: BSE: 501425; NSE: BBTC
- ISIN: INE050A01025
- Industry: Chemical Manufacturing
- Predecessor: Wallace Bros & Co.
- Founded: 1863; 163 years ago
- Founders: Wallace brothers
- Headquarters: Wallace Street, Fort, Mumbai, Maharashtra, India
- Area served: Worldwide
- Key people: Nusli N. Wadia (Chairman)
- Revenue: ▼₹247.25 crore (US$26 million) (FY18)
- Net income: ▼₹−25.83 crore (US$−2.7 million) (FY18)
- Owner: Wadia Group (65.93%)
- Website: bbtcl.com

The Bombay Burmah Trading Corporation Limited (BBTC) is an Indian trading company based in Mumbai owned by the Wadia Group. It was formed in 1863 by the Wallace Brothers of Scotland. It is India's oldest publicly traded company, and was established to engage in the Burmese tea business through the initial step of taking over the Burmese assets of William Wallace.

== History ==
The company's founding occurred when the six Wallace Brothers, originally members of a Scottish merchant house in Edinburgh, first arrived in Bombay (now Mumbai) in the 1840s. A Bombay partnership was formed in 1848 as "Wallace Bros & Co". In the mid-1850s the Wallaces set up a business in Rangoon, shipping tea to Bombay. In 1863 the business was floated as "The Bombay Burmah Trading Corporation". Its equity was held by both Indian merchants along with the Wallace Brothers, who had the controlling interests. By the 1870s the company was a leading producer of teak in Burma and Siam, as well as having interests in cotton, oil exploration and shipping.

British motivations for the third Anglo-Burmese War were partly influenced by concerns of the BBTC. The Burmese state's conflict with the BBTC furnished British leaders with a pretext for conquest. By the 1880s Wallace Brothers had become a leading financial house in London. This firm was able to affect the intelligence about Burma and, more critically, about the growing French influence in the country.

The Vissanji family purchased the company from the Wallace brothers around the time of Indian independence. In 1992, the BBTC acquired and merged in BCL Springs. Later, BBTC was acquired by the Wadia group based in Bombay.

Bombay Burmah, a part of the Wadia group, holds a majority share of 50.5 per cent in Britannia Industries, amounting to a total of 12.17 crore equity shares.

In 2023, the company announced that it will be divesting 3 tea estates in Tanzania, measuring around 3,957 acres, to Udongo Wetu, Dar es Salaam, Tanzania.

Orange County Resorts acquired eight coffee estates from Bombay Burmah for Rs 291 crore.

== Controversies ==
In January 2025, Bombay Burmah Trading Corporation, along with its promoters including Nusli Wadia and his sons Ness and Jehangir Wadia, and several affiliated entities, settled proceedings with the Securities and Exchange Board of India (SEBI) over alleged regulatory violations. The matter involved alleged lapses in disclosures relating to shareholding changes and related-party transactions, including the classification of Wallace Brothers Trading & Industrial Ltd as a public shareholder despite its connection to the promoter group. SEBI noted that the indirect acquisition of an 8.11 per cent stake through Wallace triggered requirements for an open offer, which were not complied with at the time. The corporation and associated parties agreed to pay a total settlement amount of approximately Rs. 2.13 crore without admitting or denying the regulator’s findings, thereby concluding the proceedings.

== See also ==
- List of oldest companies
- List of oldest companies in India
- List of trading companies
- Trading company
- Manjolai_labourers_massacre
