= Lovji Nusserwanjee Wadia =

Indian businessman (1702–1774)

- Born: 1702; Surat, Gujarat, India
- Died: 1774 (aged 71–72)
- Occupations: Shipwright, Businessman
- Known for: Founder of Wadia Group
- Notable work: Built the first dry-dock in Asia
- Children: Maneckji Wadia, Bomanji Wadia
- Relatives: Neville Wadia (descendant), Nusli Wadia (descendant), Ness Wadia (descendant), Jehangir Wadia (descendant)

Lovji Nusserwanjee Wadia (Lowjee Nusserwanjee Wadia) (1702–1774) was a Parsi from Surat province of Gujarat in India and was a member of the Wadia family of shipwrights and naval architects. Lovji was the founder of Wadia Group in 1736.

Lovji Wadia secured contracts with the British East India Company to build ships and docks in Bombay in 1736. Lovji Wadia's company built 355 ships, including the first ships built for the British Navy outside England. This, and subsequent efforts, would result in Bombay becoming one of the most strategically important ports for the British in Asia.

The Bombay dry-dock, the first dry-dock in Asia, was built by Lovji and his brother Sorabji in 1750.

Lovji is considered the founder of the shipping and shipbuilder industry in Bombay. To this day, Surat remains the largest break-up beaching port (where ships are stripped and disassembled) in the world.

Lovji had two sons, Maneckji and Bomanji.

The first Atash Adaran in India was established in Siganpur, near Surat, by Lovji Wadia, around 1760. His descendants are the Wadia family, whose members include Neville Wadia, Nusli Wadia, Ness Wadia and Jehangir Wadia. His great grandsons JBH Wadia and Homi Wadia founded Wadia Movietone in 1933, which had its studios at Lovji Castle (Lovejee Castle) in Chembur, Mumbai. The company even had its logo as a ship, honouring their family legacy.
