= All Saints' Church, Malabar Hill =

Church in Mumbai, India

Coordinates: 18.9558432°N 72.8031292°E

All Saints’ Church, Malabar Hill
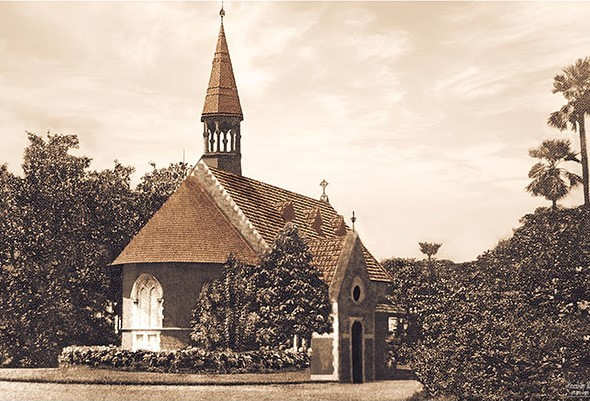
- All Saints’ Church, Malabar Hill c. 1881
- All Saints’ Church, Malabar Hill
- Location: 11, Little Gibbs Road, Mumbai 400006
- Country: India
- Denomination: Church of North India
- Tradition: Anglican

History
- Founded: 1881
- Founder(s): Major Mant (Royal Engineers), the local Anglican congregation; Lady Fergusson, wife of Sir James Fergusson.
- Dedication: All Saints
- Consecrated: 16 January 1882

Architecture
- Architectural type: Gothic Revival
- Groundbreaking: 1881

Administration
- Diocese: Diocese of Bombay

All Saints' Church on Little Gibbs Road in Malabar Hill, Mumbai, India is affiliated to the Church of North India. It was built in 1881 as an Anglican church for the local congregation that had to earlier travel some 8 kilometres to St. Thomas Cathedral in Fort. It was designed by Major Mant of the Royal Engineers, The church was founded through the efforts of the local Anglican community, with the foundation stone was laid by Lady Ferguson, wife of Sir James Fergusson, 6th Baronet, the then Governor of Bombay. It was consecrated on 16 January 1882.

The church has a semi-circular chancel and the facade is made out of Porbandar stone. It had a wooden belfry tower that was removed in 1951 when it was damaged in a cyclone.

== Notable baptisms ==
- Parveen Babi was baptised on 21 June 1997.

== Notable weddings ==
- Dina Jinnah (the only daughter of Muhammad Ali Jinnah) and Neville Wadia (heir to the Wadia industrial fortune) were married on 16 November 1938.

== Bibliography ==
- Government of Bombay (1882). Report on the Administration of the Bombay Presidency for the Year 1881-82.
