= Rajmohan Pillai =

Indian businessman (born 1964)

- Born: 12 May 1964 (age 62); Kerala, India
- Occupation: Businessman
- Relatives: Rajan Pillai (brother)

J. Rajmohan Pillai (born 12 May 1964) is an Indian businessman, and is currently the chairman of Beta Group.

== Early life ==
Rajmohan Pillai was born in Kerala, India, and educated in the state capital Trivandrum. He gained management experience with his family's business in 1981.

== Beta Group ==
Beta Group is a diversified transnational business group with a US$2 billion turnover. The group’s vertical subsidiaries include packaged processed foods manufacturing, marketing, and distribution. The Group also claims interests in entertainment, logistics, and business consulting.

The group began in the early 1900s as Beta Industries, an exporter of cashew nuts. The company is based in the Netherlands. It is one of the world's largest cashew nut companies.

Rajmohan Pillai formed the Beta Group as a conglomerate of nine companies in memory of his eldest brother, Kerala businessman Rajan Pillai, former chairman of Britannia Industries, whose death in 1995 closed what The Economic Times referred to as one of India's most dramatic corporate sagas.

Today, while still essentially a cashew products company, the Beta Group has diversified into fruit drinks, almonds, dates, and pistachios. The group owns the dry fruit and nut brands, Nut King and Ole.

=== Pillai's management ===
Pillai's previously declared intentions for the group have included:

- waging a "cashew-nut war", matching the price of potato chips marketed by multinational companies in India (2000)
- entering the pharmaceutical and hospitality sectors (2006)
- purchasing the Barista Coffee chain (2006) (it was purchased instead by Lavazza)
- diversification including a US$200 million desalination plant in Tamil Nadu (2006)
- opening an aviation academy in Malaysia (2007)
- resurrecting the Britannia Amritraj Tennis (BAT) Academy, a former Chennai center of excellence, in Thiruvananthapuram, Kerala, as Beta Ace Technique (BAT) Tennis Academy
- investing $100 million in Guinea-Bissau's cashew industry (2022) for exports to US and China

== Social foundations ==
He was instrumental in establishing the KJP Research Foundation, named in honor of his late father, K. Janardhanan Pillai. The Foundation conducts research and development in the fields of cashew and other horticultural crops. He also established the Rajan Pillai Foundation in memory of his brother Rajan Pillai, to promote excellence in arts, sports, social sciences, and medicine, serving the cause of humanity. The Rajan Pillai Foundation institutes and presents awards to accomplished individuals in international relations, social welfare services, and industry development.

== Legal cases ==
Pillai, as Managing Director of Pace International Ltd, was one of four men convicted of fraud over a letter of credit in 2008. He was sentenced to two years imprisonment and fined ₹200,000 but appealed the conviction and the sentences have been suspended until the appeal is resolved.

== Thesis and publications ==
In 2006, he was awarded a doctorate in business management by the New Age International University of Seborga, Italy, (a diploma mill unlicensed by any Italian or European authority, which is an offshoot of the Institute of Education, Research & Development, Kolkata) for a thesis that chronicled the history of the global cashew industry.

His other published works are:

- A Wasted Death – a book on the rise and fall of Rajan Pillai, co-authored with K. Govindan Kutty (Penguin Books, 2001, ISBN 978-0-14-100601-7; subsequently translated and published in five Indian languages).
- K. Janardhanan Pillaiyude Jeevitham Daivathinte Nadakom – a Malayalam book about the life of Pillai's father. Co-authored with V. S. Nair (Current Books, 2002).
- The World Cashew Industry – a book detailing all aspects of the production, processing, and trading of cashews. Co-authored with Mrs. P. Santha, a relative and former principal scientist with the Indian Council of Agricultural Research (Rajan Pillai Foundation, Kollam, 2008). The book incorporates several chapters of Pillai's thesis.
- Siddharthan – a novel on the life of Rajan Pillai narrating his material life and spiritual transformation.

== Awards and recognition ==
He was awarded the Vayalar Ramavarma Samskarika Vedi award for the year 2019 for his book Siddharthan.

He received the Export Excellence award for being the best Indian exporter to the USA in the cashew sector at the Kerala-America partnership summit 2023 in Kochi.

In 2024 he was elected as President of Sport Climbing Federation of India (SCFI).
