= Jehangir Wadia =

Indian businessman

- Born: 6 July 1973 (age 53); Bombay, Maharashtra, India
- Occupation: Businessman
- Spouse: Celina Wadia (m. 2003)
- Children: 2
- Father: Nusli Wadia
- Family: Wadia family; Jinnah family

Jehangir Nusli "Jeh" Wadia (born 6 July 1973) is an Indian businessman, who was the Managing Director of Go First, Bombay Dyeing and Bombay Realty. He was also a Director on the Boards of Britannia Industries, the Bombay Burmah Trading Corporation, Wadia Techno – Engineering Services and others.

Wadia, his father and his brother are the only direct living descendants of Muhammad Ali Jinnah and his family.

== Life and career ==
Jehangir Nusli Wadia was born in Mumbai to businessman Nusli Wadia and former air hostess Maureen Wadia. He has one brother, Ness Wadia, who is a businessman. His paternal grandparents are Neville Wadia and Dina Jinnah. His great-grandparents were Muhammad Ali Jinnah and Rattanbai Petit, both part of the illustrious Jinnah and the Petit family. His other great-grandfather, Sir Ness Wadia, played an important role in turning the city of Bombay into one of the world's largest cotton gin trading centers during the late 19th century.

Wadia did his initial schooling from the Lawrence School in Sanawar and moved to a boarding school in England to complete his graduation. Jehangir earned a master's degree in science from the Warwick University in England.

The Bombay High Court in 1999 stopped Wadia from holding a New Year's Eve rave party in Goa, for which he had illegally occupied government-owned land.

Wadia is married to Celina since 2003 who is from Australia, they met in London and have two children together, Jr. Jahangir and Ella. Celina runs her own fashion line under the brand name C Femme.

Wadia is the managing director of GoAir (founded in 2005). The World Economic Forum elected him as a Young Global Leader in the year 2008. Wadia was the Managing Director of Go First, Bombay Dyeing and its real estate division Bombay Realty. He is also a Director on the boards of Britannia Industries, the Bombay Burmah Trading Corporation, Wadia Techno – Engineering Services and others.
