= Whitny Braun =

American bioethicist (born 1982)

- Born: Whitny Braun de Lobatón; Redlands, California, U.S.
- Education: Loma Linda University; Claremont Graduate University; Syracuse University (JD)
- Occupation: Bioethicist

Whitny Braun de Lobatón is an American bioethicist, professor, investigative researcher, documentary filmmaker and podcaster who has been featured on the Discovery Channel as the host and executive producer of Undiscovered: The Lost Lincoln and co-hosts the podcast The Murders at Starved Rock with Andy Hale. She has also been featured on NPR and the National Geographic Channel television program Taboo. Her major academic work is centered in the fields of bioethics and public health and has focused on the Jain practice of Sallekhana and the Parsi practice of Dakhmenashini. She is currently the director of the master's in bioethics and professor of bioethics at Loma Linda University.

Braun has written for the Huffington Post and has published academically on the topic of healthcare in the American prison system, specifically with regard to organ donation and the death penalty. Her main academic research has focused on the ongoing legal battle over Sallekhana in the Indian courts and possible American legal precedent for the practice. She has spoken at several international conferences about world religions' philosophical approaches to artificial reproductive technology and the embryo industry in the United States as well as the ethics of disaster management and quarantine. She has been published in "Natural Transitions" magazine, a publication which examines options for the dying process and has been interviewed on the topic of Sallekhana by Scientific American magazine. Her research has also been featured in an interview with Steve Lopez of the Los Angeles Times.

== Sallekhana ==
In 2006, human rights activist Nikhil Soni and his lawyer Madhav Mishra filed a Public Interest Litigation (PIL) with the Rajasthan High Court. The PIL claimed that Sallekhana should be considered to be suicide under the Indian legal statute. They argued that Article 21 of the Indian constitution only guarantees the right to life, but not to death. The petition extends to those who facilitate individuals taking the vow with aiding and abetting an act of suicide. In response, the Jain community argued that it is a violation of the Indian Constitution's guarantee of religious freedom. It was argued that Sallekhana serves as a means of coercing widows and elderly relatives into taking their own lives. After being in India for the initial legal battle over Sallekhana in 2006 Braun presented the first academic paper on Sallekhana before the UNESCO Chair in Bioethics Conference in Eilat, Israel, in 2007.

This landmark case sparked debate in India, where national bioethical guidelines have been in place since 1980. However, it also raised the question of Sallekhana in the United States. Braun documented the final days of a woman who took Sallekhana in Texas in 2013, named Dr. Bhagwati Gada.

In August 2015, the Rajasthan High Court stated that the practice is not an essential tenet of Jainism and banned the practice making it punishable under section 306 and 309 (Abetment of Suicide) of the Indian Penal Code.

On August 31, 2015, advocates Dhawal Jiwan Mehta and Krishna Balaji Moorthy of the law firm of Wadia Ghandy in Mumbai argued a Special Leave Petition before the Supreme Court of India to have the August 10, 2015, ruling of the High Court of Rajasthan against Sallekhana overturned. The appeal featured excerpts from Braun's dissertation arguing the philosophical and legal nature of the act of Sallekhana. The Supreme Court overturned the ruling of the High Court of Rajasthan temporarily, allowing Jains to continue practicing Sallekhana, until the Supreme Court can fully engage the issue with regard to the constitutionality of the act. This process could take up to three to five years.

== Historical research and Media ==
Braun works as a researcher and authenticator, investigating the provenance of items of potential historical significance. She has investigated an alleged image of Billy the Kid, a tintype that may show Billy as a teenager.

In 2020, Braun hosted and served as executive producer of Undiscovered: The Lost Lincoln, a documentary special that aired on Discovery. In 2021, Braun served as the supervising producer and lead researcher of "The Murders at Starved Rock" a documentary series exploring the 1960 triple homicide of three suburban women in Starved Rock State Park.

Since 2022 she has served as the co-host and a researcher on the podcast "The Starved Rock Murders with Andy Hale."

== Personal life ==
Braun was born in Redlands, California and raised between Downey, California and Coulterville, California. She was born into the Seventh-day Adventist church as a seventh-generation member of the church through her mother's line. She is currently an associate scholar of the Center for Christian Bioethics at Loma Linda University, and the Associate Director of the Center for Understanding World Religions based as her research looking at anthropological and sociological aspects of Eastern and Central Asian religions and their applications towards bioethics.

Braun is the daughter of firearms historian and gunsmith Dr. James Braun, featured alongside her in the Discovery Channel documentary "Undiscovered: The Lost Lincoln", and the granddaughter of physicist and physician Dr. Ernest Braun who pioneered early nuclear medicine technologies in cancer therapy and the great-great-granddaughter of Ory T. Davis, pioneering photographer of the Old West. As a teenager she participated in the Junior Statesmen of America at Georgetown University. At the age of 18, she was the youngest contestant to ever compete on the American trivia game show Win Ben Stein's Money.

Braun divides her time between Southern California, Peru and the Sierra Nevadas, near Yosemite National Park, where she keeps her collection of vintage Airstream travel trailers. In 2025, she graduated from Syracuse University's College of Law with her Juris Doctor.
