= BCL Springs =

The Bombay Company Ltd. was established in 1886. It is one of the oldest companies in India. The company was revived in 1986 by setting up two divisions: Precision Springs Division and Balance Division.

The Precision Spring division of the company was set up in 1987 in technical collaboration with NHK Spring Co. Ltd., Japan, to manufacture Cold Coiled precision springs. It commenced commercial production in 1987. The company established itself as one of the leading manufacturer of precision Springs in India under the leadership of N.Vijayaraghavan.

In 1992, the business merged into The Bombay Burmah Trading Corporation Ltd. Over the next 20 years, the company expanded its installed capacity from 1,000 metric tons to 10,000 metric tons in 2011 to cater to the growing demands of automotive components market. BCL Springs became the second largest manufacturer of precision springs in India, supplying car manufacturers Tata Motors and Hindustan Motors.

The Wadia Group owns a controlling stake in the Bombay Burmah Trading Corporation Ltd as the largest shareholder, with 39% of outstanding shares.

in 2011, the Wadia Group sold BCL Springs to NHK Spring Co. Ltd. in an effort to focus on more core businesses and to reduce debt.
