= Resident Commissioner, Bombay Dockyard =

Office of the Resident Commissioner, Bombay
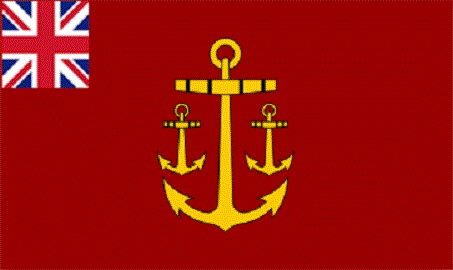
- Navy Board Flag
- Navy Office
- Member of: Navy Board
- Reports to: Comptroller of the Navy
- Appointer: Board of Admiralty
- Term length: Not fixed (typically 1–3 years)
- Inaugural holder: ?
- Formation: 1810-1831

The Resident Commissioner Bombay also known as the Resident Commissioner of the Navy at Bombay was the chief representative of the Navy Board based at Bombay Dockyard. He was senior official of the yard responsible for the supervision of the principal officers of the yard from 1808 until 1816.

== Office Holders ==
The Commissioner of Bombay Dockyard held a seat and a vote on the Navy Board in London.

- 1808–1811, Captain George Dundas.
- 1811–1813, Captain Peter Puget.(also commissioner at Madras Dockyard 1810–1816).
- 1813–1816, Captain James Johnston.
