= Wallace Brothers =

Six sons of Edinburgh architect Lewis Wallace

The Wallace brothers were the six sons of Edinburgh architect Lewis Wallace. In varying combinations, the brothers established themselves as one of the leading nineteenth century East India merchants, trading in cotton, tea, coffee and other commodities. Through their investments in Burma, they became the world's leading exporter of teak. The rise of independent governments after World War II meant the progressive loss of the family's Eastern assets and the redeployment of capital back to London. This capital was used in the 1960s to establish Wallace Brothers as a banking house but this strategy did not long survive the Secondary banking crisis of 1973–1975.

== Company structure ==
Wallace Brothers was not a single entity. The brothers were the six sons, born between 1818 and 1836, of Edinburgh architect and builder Lewis Alexander Wallace. In order they were William (1818–1888); Richard (1819–1885); Lewis (1821–1906); George (1824–1903); Robert (1831–1878); and Alexander (1831–1925). All worked as East India merchants, in varying combinations.

The London partnership of Wallace Brothers was formed in 1863 by Lewis and George, with Richard joining in 1865; the other three brothers did not join it. Wallace & Co. was the Bombay (now Mumbai) company, in which most of the brothers had stakes. Individual partnerships, often with non-family members, were found in peripheral parts of the business both in England and India.

William alone developed the Burma business, largely financed by Wallace & Co. It was later capitalised as The Bombay Burmah Trading Corporation. The major firms during 19th century were Wallace Brothers (Brothers) in London; Wallace & Co in Bombay; and Bombay Burmah Trading (Bombay Burmah) in Burma.

== From London to Bombay ==
The impetus for the brothers becoming East India traders was Lewis senior's provision of capital to J G Frith, a merchant well established in the Bombay trade. The eldest son William was the first to go to Bombay in 1841 but disliked it and came back to London to form a partnership with Frith called Frith Wallace. Next, Lewis went to Bombay in 1844 to work in the local Frith business, taking it over in 1848; this was the start of the Bombay firm of Wallace & Co. Back in London, Frith Wallace was dissolved in 1847 and a new firm of Frith Sands was formed with William as a partner; they worked closely with Wallace & Co.in Bombay. In 1850 George joined Lewis in partnership in Wallace & Co. in Bombay followed in 1853 by William and then Robert and Alexander. The Wallace & Co partnership was formally incorporated in 1862 by all the brothers except William. The business between London and Bombay was the traditional one of shipping agents trading cotton, coffee, pearls, etc. later importing cotton goods from Manchester, which became their leading activity.

== Bombay to Burma ==
The expansion of the railways in India led to a demand for teak from Burma. In the mid-1850s Wallace & Co contracted a delivery of teak but there were delivery problems and William, the eldest brother, was sent out to resolve them. He liked the opportunities there and based himself in Rangoon, supplying teak to India. He bought land and property, built a saw mill and even began shipbuilding. Although he operated as a sole trader, the finance came from Wallace & Co and the extent of loans began to put pressure on the relationship between the five brothers in Bombay and William in Rangoon. The solution was a public flotation of The Bombay Burmah Trading Corporation in 1863. In the following year, William transferred all the assets for a cash sum and retired to London, taking no further interest in the family businesses. In typical agency style Wallace & Co was to be the Secretary and Manager. For all that Bombay Burmah was an independent public company, control remained firmly in Wallace hands until 1956 and it was to provide an important part of Wallace & Co profitability. As a footnote, William also received ten per cent of the shares as Founders shares, which entitled him to one-third of the profits in excess of a given level of dividend. These Funders shares were to exist for as long as they remained in William's name; this provoked a major controversy after his death in 1888 as the Wallace family kept the shares in his name in the executor's account.

== Expanding business ==
The brothers gradually removed their residence from India. William retired in 1864, George followed suit two years later and Robert had moved to Manchester to oversee that end of the cotton trade. Alexander was the last of the brothers to leave India, in 1867. An illustration of the prominence that the brothers had achieved is that Alexander had become Chairman of the Commercial Bank of India in 1864 and three of his brothers had also been directors. (Alexander was later become Governor of the Bank of England). Family control of Wallace & Co and Bombay Burmah now resided in London and after the death of Richard in 1885 it was Lewis and Alexander who carried the business through to the next century. The textile trade with India remained a substantial part of the business. The American civil war gave a substantial boost as Manchester now needed India's cotton. In the 1870s Brothers was also engaged in general commodities trading between India and Europe and financing the teak trade out of Burma. New business ventures were also being sought. For example, in 1878 Brothers entered the oil trade in North America – exporting oil for Standard Oil into India in casks. In 1886 the firm was the first to enter market for Russia's Black Sea oil. Rice was another important market, the trade being run from London by a new company, Arracan, which had a mill in Rangoon and chartered the shipping. (This was sold to Sir John Ellerman inn 1917).

== Expansion in Burma ==
Extensive new teak leases were granted by the King in 1880. Until then the forests had been worked by contractors, with Wallace doing the financing, marketing and shipping. Now, Bombay Burmah expanded the scale of its operations and did the timber extraction itself. However, by the mid-1880s French interests had become close to the King culminating in Court action against Bombay Burmah. Indirectly, this precipitated the Third Anglo-Burmese War in 1886 and the deposing of the King. From then Burma was administered from India but the company's long-term future was secure. Competition for teak supplies was coming from Siam (now Thailand), and Bombay Burmah opened an office in Bangkok in 1884. For eighty years, Bombay Burmah was the single largest teak company in the industry, marketing over a third of the world's teak supplies.

== The Bombay Company ==
In 1886 it was decided to split the interests of Wallace & Co. The original Company would be confined to supervising Bombay Burmah while a new company, The Bombay Company would be responsible for all other Wallace interests in India. Bombay Company took over the Karachi branch and further branches were opened in Delhi in 1893, Calcutta in 1903 and Madras (now Chennai) in 1906. The cotton trade in India was gradually changing as Lancashire product was being replaced by Indian manufacture. To exploit this, in 1901 The Bombay Co. bought a share in Lakhshmi Cotton Manufacturing becoming secretary, agent and manager. A second mill was bought and in 1908 Bombay Co. decided to build a larger mill, financing the project with a public subscription for Vishnu Cotton Mill. Further east the Wallace enterprise still explored new opportunities. A tanning company was formed in 1902 to supply the U.S. market; an oil concession in Sumatra lost money and closed after ten years, while there were also investments in rubber plantations in Java and Johore.

== Corporate reorganisation ==
Lewis Wallace died in 1906 and the withdrawal of his capital from the partnership caused financial stress. To avoid this happening again with the sole remaining brother, Alexander, the partnership was incorporated in 1911 as Wallace Brothers & Co. Its articles stated that it was formed to carry on the business of East India merchants etc. and take over the business of the six partners; these consisted of Alexander as Chairman and largest shareholder, four other family members, and Reginald Macaulay, destined to become a leading figure in the Wallace story. Alexander died in 1925, aged 89, and his dominant shareholding went to his son, Falconer Wallace. Although the family continued to control the business, Board appointments increasingly involved non-family members.

== Inter-war years ==
World War I brought inevitable dislocation but Bombay Co. prospered in the 1920s. Although the Manchester trade began to decline, the cotton mills and general trading did well. Immediately before the War, Bombay Burmah diversified into tea plantations in southern India. The year after war ended, an investment was made in the Indian firm of Chrestian & Co, one of the world's largest producers of mica. Although there had been an immediate recovery in the teak trade, Bombay Burmah had been unable to pay a dividend between 1921 and 1924. The recession in 1929 hit activity across the group; the cotton mills, tea and rubber were all depressed and Bombay Burmah lost money in the early 1930s.The rubber plantations in Java were hard hit; rubber which had been trading at 4s–8d a pound in 1925 fell to below 2d in 1932. In 1933 Brothers decided that The Bombay Company's capital could be better used in London and there was a substantial repatriation of funds.

== World War II and withdrawal from the East ==
The Indian businesses prospered in the early years of the War. The cotton mills boomed, helped by the purchase of the Prailhad Mill in 1939; tea and teak also benefitted from increased wartime demand. However, after the entry of Japan into the War in December 1941, the Wallace assets east of India were rapidly lost to the Group and were not easily restored after 1945. Following the creation of the Union of Burma in 1948, the State took control of all forests in 1949. Bombay Burmah's leases in Thailand also expired in 1955. There was a worldwide search for additional sources of hardwood and Bombay Burmah selected North Borneo in 1949. Partnered by the long-established North Borneo Trading, it formed North Borneo Timbers. In 1953 it acquired full ownership, with 30% being held by Brothers. The investment in North Borneo was successful as were its tea plantations in India and in the 1960s the firm also moved into cocoa and oil palms. North Borneo Timber floated in 1968 on the Malaysia Stock Exchange.

As with Burma, so the Indian businesses had to come to terms with an independent government, particularly the steep increase in taxation. Some businesses were sold and the non-India businesses of Wallace & Co were put into a new holding company. In 1956 the Government announced that the agency system was to be ended. Wallace & Co remained Secretary to Bombay Burmah but ceased to be manager. Trading houses owned by non-nationals were falling out of favour and in 1958 the agencies of the two cotton mills were relinquished and the shares sold. By the 1960s there was little left for the Bombay Company in India and it ceased trading in 1969.

Other geographical areas were actively pursued but not all with lasting success. An investment was made in Kenya in 1950, providing a springboard for several ventures – cattle ranching, pyrethrum, coffee and tea. There were short term property investments in Canada; an unsuccessful venture into rubber plantations in Java; and fish farming in Peru.

== Wallace becomes a finance house ==
Much of the early withdrawal from the East was involuntary but there was an increasing realisation that the future lay nearer to home; the solution was to redeploy capital to finance and banking. The 1960s saw the complete withdrawal from East Africa and other peripheral interests. The final stage came in 1972 when the Wallace interests were combined with those of the Tao and Wong families in a new Company, Ocean Leila Ltd of Hong Kong.

The London operation of Wallace Brothers had always had a long history of trade finance. It had held an account with the Bank of England since 1863 and had issued its own bills of exchange; in that respect the original decision in 1965 to expand into banking appeared logical. Unfortunately, the secondary banking crisis of 1973–1975 rendered the outcome less satisfactory than expected. The first step had been to recruit an experienced team of bankers, three of whom joined the main board. To facilitate the new structure, Wallace Bros & Co represented the bank and Wallace Brothers Trading & Industrial contained everything else.

As with most companies in the finance sector at that time, the Bank enjoyed rapid growth: between 1966 and 1973, assets increased by nearly thirty times. In March 1972 it merged with E.D.Sassoon Banking to create Wallace Bros Sassoon Bank, (later Wallace Bros Bank). The Crown Agents held 90% of Sassoon Banking and therefore ended up with 25% of Wallace Bros Bank. This happened less than a year away from the secondary bank crisis, to which the Crown Agents was one of the major contributors. Wallace Brothers and Company (Holdings) Limited and its UK subsidiaries were taken over by Standard Bank in 1977 and were wound up over the following twelve years. Wallace Brothers Trading and Industrial Limited was sold to OSE Holdings (HK) Limited in 1979. Other companies in the Wallace Brothers group were closed down during the 1980s. Wallace Brothers and Company (Holdings) Limited was liquidated in 1989.
