= Rajan Pillai =

Indian businessman (1947–1995)

- Born: 1947; Kerala, India
- Died: 7 July 1995 (aged 47–48); New Delhi, India
- Occupation: Businessman
- Spouse: Neena Pillai
- Relatives: K. Ravindranathan Nair (uncle)
- Criminal charges: Breach of trust and fraud

Rajan Pillai (1947 – 7 July 1995) was an Indian businessman from Kerala, popularly known as the Biscuit Baron. He was to be sentenced to a possible 14-year imprisonment on 23 counts of breach of trust and one of cheating-by the Singapore courts, but died in custody four days after his arrest, largely because he was denied medical treatment while in custody in Delhi, India; the subsequent investigations led to jail reforms.

== Career ==
Rajan Pillai was born in Kerala, India in 1947, the son of a trader in cashews.

Early in his career, he invested in a five-star hotel project in Goa. In the mid-1970s, Rajan Pillai set up his base in Singapore with 20th Century Foods packaging potato chips and peanuts. He collaborated with Canadian businessman F. Ross Johnson, head of the giant American food corporation Standard Brands. In 1984, Johnson sent him to London to head the newly acquired Nabisco Commodities. Soon after, Johnson took over the Asian subsidiaries of Huntley & Palmer, the British biscuit manufacturing company which controlled Britannia Industries, India's largest bakery and biscuit-making concern, and handed its entire area of operation in Asia to Pillai. Pillai became known in India as the 'Biscuit King' or 'Biscuit Baron'.

He took over Nabisco's other Asian subsidiaries. Pillai then established links with Boussois-Souchon-Neuvesel (BSN), the French food company, and by 1989 controlled six Asian companies worth over US$400 million.

Even though he claimed to own Britannia Industries, he actually controlled only 3 per cent of its equity; the rest of his businesses were a complex interwoven and interdependent financial mesh. In 1993, owing to debt, Pillai began selling off his companies to financial institutions. The Wadia Group acquired a stake in Associated Biscuits International (ABIL), and became an equal partner with Groupe Danone in Britannia Industries Limited. In what The Economic Times referred to as one of India's most dramatic corporate sagas, Pillai ceded control to Wadia and Danone after a bitter boardroom struggle. Pillai's mentor, Johnson, demanded the return of US$30 million which he had advanced Pillai to buy Britannia. Singapore's Commercial Affairs Department, which was investigating Pillai's business deals, completed its investigation in March 1993 and charged Pillai on 22 counts of breach of trust and fraud and running up a debt of US$17.2 million. As a court prepared to pronounce a 14-year prison term on him, Pillai fled his Singapore base to India in 1995.

== Arrest and death ==
In his home state Kerala, he obtained bail and a stay against his extradition to Singapore, despite an Interpol red alert for his arrest. On 4 July 1995, Indian police seized him in a pre-dawn raid at New Delhi's five-star Le Méridien Hotel, and took him to Tihar Jail. Pillai appealed for medical treatment, and the judge wrote to the resident medical officer (RMO) of the jail enquiring about Rajan's ailment. However, there was no response to the appeal, and Pillai died the next day in custody from complications from liver cirrhosis. At the time of his death, he was awaiting an extradition hearing.

Pillai's widow, Nina Pillai, alleged that a conspiracy was behind the death of her husband in the jail. She urged the court to direct a CBI probe on the conspiracy angle as she feared foul play in the death of her husband. The Chief Metropolitan Magistrate (CMM) had ordered a CBI inquiry based on the petition. The medical officer who conducted the autopsy, deposed before the CMM, and said that Pillai had died of asphyxia caused by blocking of blood in the respiratory system. The Justice Leila Seth Commission under Leila Seth was constituted to enquire into the conspiracy angle of his custodial death, but did not find any conclusive evidence. The Commission had issued advertisements in the newspapers seeking public help in the matter. Nina Pillai said she would provide evidence about the conspiracy angle, but later she refused to name the conspirator. The Commission concluded that 'ways and means must be found to ensure that competent doctors were posted in the jail'. The Commission also suggested that the United Nations Standard Minimum Rules be followed, and a prisoner should be allowed to be treated by his own doctor. Following the submission of its report, there were systemic changes at the Tihar Jail, with a 24-hour attendance by doctors. There were 75 doctors on call compared to the previous 16, and initial medical check up was made imperative.

Nina Pillai filed another petition seeking compensation for her husband's death. In May 2011, the Delhi High Court noted that there was lack of communication between jail authorities and the magistrate who refused to give Pillai specialist treatment. The Court held the State liable for lapses which led to Pillai's death, and awarded a token compensation of ₹1 million to his wife and children. In March 2012, Nina Pillai filed a petition again alleging that the Court's directions on jail reforms and handling of ailing prisoners, given on her earlier plea, were never implemented. The High Court sought a reply from the Delhi government on the plea and listed the matter for further hearing on 31 May 2012.

== Family ==
The famous Film producer and Businessman K. Ravindranathan Nair aka ‘Achani’ Ravi is his maternal uncle.

Pillai married Nina Gopika Nair Pillai (later Nina Pillai) in 1983, and had two sons. Krishna Pillai and Shiva Pillai .

Rajmohan established the Rajan Pillai Foundation in memory of his brother, to promote excellence in arts, sports, social sciences, and medicine, serving the cause of humanity. The Rajan Pillai Foundation institutes and presents awards to accomplished individuals in international relations, social welfare services and industry development. Rajmohan co-authored a book with K. Govindan Kutty titled A Wasted Death – the rise and fall of Rajan Pillai. The book was released in 2001 by the then Chief Minister of Kerala A. K. Antony, and it was subsequently translated and published in five Indian languages.
