= Darashaw Nosherwan Wadia =

Indian geologist

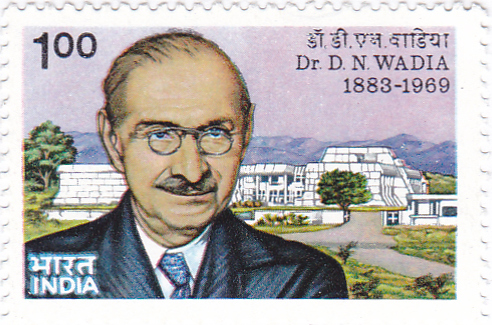
A 1984 Indian postage stamp showing Dr. D. N. Wadia and the Wadia Institute of Himalayan Geology, Dehradun in the background.

Darashaw Nosherwan Wadia FRS (23 October 1883 – 15 June 1969) was a pioneering geologist in India and among the first Indian scientists to work in the Geological Survey of India. He is remembered for his work on the stratigraphy of the Himalayas. He helped establish geological studies and investigations in India, specifically at the Institute of Himalayan Geology, which was renamed in 1976 after him as the Wadia Institute of Himalayan Geology. His textbook on the Geology of India, first published in 1919, continues to be in use.

== Early life ==
Wadia was born at Surat in what is now Gujarat, the fourth of nine children of Nosherwan and Gooverbai Wadia on 23 October 1883. They belonged to Parsi family who had traditionally been shipbuilders and another member of this community included Ardaseer Cursetjee, the first Indian elected Fellow of the Royal Society. Nosherwan Wadia worked as a station master in the Indian Railways at Bombay, Baroda and Central India. Young Wadia received his early schooling in a private school at Surat and later at Sir J. J. English School before the family moved to Baroda in 1894 where he went to Baroda High School. The interest in science was instilled by his oldest brother, Munchershaw N. Wadia who was an educationist in the princely state of Baroda. At 16 years, he moved to Baroda College, where he was influenced by Adarji M. Masani the professor of natural history and Aravind Ghosh. He obtained a BSc degree in 1903 in botany and zoology and another BSc degree in 1905 in botany and geology. A noted educationist in Baroda State, who gave him his abiding love of science, devotion to knowledge, and a rational outlook upon human relationships, all of which were to dominate his subsequent career. The study in geology was helped by the geological collections that were made under Maharaja Sayaji Rao Gaekwar. In 1905 he graduated with a M.A. in biology and geology and began to teach undergraduates. Education in geology in India at that time was restricted to the Universities of Calcutta and Madras where officers of the Geological Survey of India sometimes acted as part-time lecturers. At the age of 23, Wadia obtained the post of a Professor of Geology at the Prince of Wales College at Jammu and continued to work there for the next fourteen years.

== Work at Jammu ==
Wadia found the college very supportive. The location also allowed him to make geological studies in the adjoining region. In 1909 he married Miss Alan G. Contractor. They had a daughter who died in infancy. He spent vacations in the Himalayan region, collecting rocks and fossils. In 1919 he published a textbook of Geology for students, the first new work after the Manual of geology in India which had been revised in 1893. Several editions (sixth in 1966) were to be produced later and this continues to be a major text in Indian geology. In 1925 he discovered tusks and fragments of the extinct elephant-like animal already described as Stegodon ganesa.

== Geological Survey of India ==
In 1920, the Geological Survey of India (GSI) expanded from 20 to 32 scientific officers. In 1921, a post was offered to Wadia, then aged 37. He was not the first Indian to join the Survey, but was the first who did not have a degree from a European university. His early work was on the geology of the Himalayas and it involved careful field work and mapping. He collected numerous Middle and Upper Cambrian trilobites which were studied by F R C Reed in 1934. He also found Upper Triassic plant fossils and Eocene Foraminifera leading to revisions of the map of the region. When he visited the Survey headquarters at Calcutta, he lectured at the Presidency College, then under the University of Calcutta. After G. E. Pilgrim's retirement in 1928, Wadia became the Paleontologist at the GSI and continued in that post until 1935. When Wadia left the GSI in 1938, it was in the rank of Assistant Superintendent, the same one in which he had joined.

== Ceylon ==
After retiring from the GSI in 1938, Wadia took up an offer from the Government of Ceylon for the post of Mineralogist. This position had earlier been held by J.S. Coates but not filled since 1935. He worked on many aspects of the geology of Sri Lanka. Wadia's first wife, Alan (married in 1909), daughter of G.P. Contractor, died in Kashmir in the mid 1930s and he married Meher Gustadji K. Medivala at Colombo in 1940.

== Return to India ==
Wadia returned to India in 1945. In 1947, he became and advisor to the government led by Jawaharlal Nehru. At a meeting he suggested that India should move away from a "lukewarm, hesitating and even patronising" attitude to science and bring about co-operation among Indian scientists to help in tapping "the basic sources of wealth and well-being, yet imperfectly tapped in land, man-power, its rivers, forests, minerals and electric power". In 1948, Homi Jehangir Bhabha who was associated with the creation of the Indian Atomic Energy Act invited Wadia in 1949 to help survey for raw materials for use in reactors.atomic energy. This led to the extraction of thorium and uranium ores in Kerala, Bihar and Rajasthan.

== Other contributions ==
Wadia worked on Himalayan stratigraphy, dating various sections and understanding the age and origin of the ranges. He studied the fossils of the Siwaliks, examining the collections at the British Museum along with A T Hopwood and W E Swinton around 1926–27. The Trigonometrical Survey of India had found discrepancies in measurements based on triangulation and those made using astronomy observations. This was described in 1855 by Archdeacon J. H. Pratt of Calcutta and is now called the Bouguer anomaly which he explained on the basis of isostasy. Others like Airy suggested that it was due to light rocks below the Himalayas while Glennie suggested a crust warp as a cause in 1930. Wadia reviewed this matter in 1938 and suggested that it required further work to resolve the debate. Another topic that interested him was the age of the Salt Range which had been suggested as either Cambrian, Pre-Cambrian or Eocene. Birbal Sahni and his fellow researchers reported angiosperms and insect fossils. Wadia suggested that there was some thrust of Cambrian plates over Eocene plates in some areas. Wadia took an interest in soil science. In 1954, he suggested that the Pleistocene Ice Age of the northern hemisphere was a time of great rainfall (the Pluvial Age) in the semi-tropical and tropical latitudes. One of his early contributions was to explain the knee-bend or syntaxis in the mountain ranges around Nanga Parbat.

== Honours and awards ==
Wadia presided over numerous committees and was on the editorial board of several journals. Wadia received numerous awards for his work. The Back Award from the Royal Geographical Society in 1934, the Lyell Medal from the Geological Society of London in 1943, the Joyakishan Medal from the Indian Association for the Advancement of Science in 1944, the Jagdish Bose Memorial Medal from the Royal Asiatic Society in 1947, an honorary degree of D.Sc. from the University of Delhi in 1947, the Nehru Medal of the National Geographic Society and the Padma Bhushan from India in 1958. He was elected a Fellow of the Royal Society in 1957.

In 1951, a 2 Anna Indian postage stamp to commemorate the centenary of the Geological Survey of India illustrated Stegodon ganesa was released. In 1984 an Indian postal stamp with a portrait of Wadia was issued.
