= Jim Wadia =

Indian businessman

Jamshed "Jim" Wadia (born 1947) was a CEO of Arthur Andersen in August 1997, a post from which he resigned on 7 August 2000 due to his inability to favorably steer the then impending spinning off of Andersen Consulting, now known as Accenture, one of the largest consulting firms in the world at the time.

== Career with Arthur Andersen ==
He was born in Mumbai, India, to the Wadia family. He studied accounting and law in Switzerland. He joined Arthur Andersen's consulting practice in England in 1977 and after a fast rise through the company, became the CEO in 1997 at the age of 49.

He was nominated as one of the top 25 consultants of the year 2000 by Consulting Magazine.

== Resignation from Arthur Andersen ==
In August 2000, Arthur Andersen was directed to spin off Andersen Consulting by the International Chamber of Commerce while awarding the former $1.2 billion in back payments and with the ruling that Andersen Consulting could no longer use the Andersen name. Within four hours of the ruling Wadia resigned. Jim Wadia would provide insight on his resignation years later at a Harvard Business School case activity about the split. It turned out that the Arthur Andersen board passed a resolution saying he had to resign if he didn't get at least an incremental $4 billion out of the $14.5 billion demanded by Arthur Andersen in the lawsuit (either through negotiation or via the arbitrator decision) for the consulting practice to split off, hence his quick resignation once the decision was announced.

== Career After Arthur Andersen ==
On 1 November 2001, Wadia joined the global law firm of Linklaters as its first chief operating officer. After almost exactly 3 years, Wadia left the firm in November 2004. It is said that he joined the firm expressly to implement a £30 million SAP ERP system. Jim Wadia is also a member of Royal Society for Arts and of Prince's Youth Business Trust Advisory Council.

== See also ==
- Accenture's splitting from Arthur Andersen
