= Wadia family =

Parsi shipbuilders in India (c.1730–1893)

- Current region: Mumbai, India
- Origin: Surat, Gujarat, India
- Members: See below
- Connected families: Jinnah family Petit family
- Traditions: Zoroastrianism
- Heirlooms: Wadia Group

The Wadia family is a Parsi family from Surat, India, currently based in Mumbai, India. The family rose to wealth in the mid-1700s as shipbuilders serving the British East India Company as the latter established its sway over India.

During the declining years of the British Raj, Neville Wadia, scion of the main branch of the family, married Dina Jinnah, the only child of Muhammad Ali Jinnah, the founder of Pakistan. Despite being the only descendants of the founder of Pakistan, the family chose to stick to their mills and factories in India rather than emigrate to the new country.

They run the Wadia Group of companies, one of the larger industrial conglomerates in India.

== History ==
Lovji Nusserwanjee Wadia advanced the Wadia shipbuilding dynasty in 1736, when he obtained a contract from the British East India Company for building docks and ships in Bombay (present-day Mumbai). Although the Wadias would eventually come to be considered a Bombay family, many of them remained in Surat, where one branch of the family established a ship breaking yard (where ships are dismantled) that remains one of the largest of its kind in the world. The Wadia family has three main branches, each dealing in a particular industry: textiles, shipping, and jewelry. They have been active in a host of other smaller businesses, including film-making, biscuits and bakery products, tea and rubber plantations, fashion magazines and aviation.

The poem whose words would become the lyrics of The Star-Spangled Banner, the national anthem of the United States, were written in 1812 on board a Wadia-built British Royal Navy ship, HMS Minden by Francis Scott Key.

By the 1840s, the family was one of the leading forces in the Indian shipbuilding industry. At that time they had built over a hundred warships for Britain, and had trading networks around the world.

The prominent women of the Wadia family, including Motlibai Maneckji Wadia, Jerbai Nusserwanji Wadia, and Lady Hirabai Cowasji Jehangir, were known for their philanthropy in providing financial support to Zoroastrian temples, establishing schools and hospitals, and supporting the arts in the 1800s. More recently, Neville Wadia continued the philanthropic tradition of his family by continuing to establish hospitals and schools. The Wadia family has endowed Nowrosjee Wadia College in Pune.

Lovji Nusserwanjee Wadia's great-grandsons, JBH Wadia and Homi Wadia founded Wadia Movietone in 1933, which had its studios at Lovji Castle (Lovejee Castle) in Chembur, Mumbai, India. The company has a ship as its logo, honoring their family legacy.

The Wadia family owns a textile company called Bombay Dyeing which was founded by Nowrosjee Wadia who became a big texitle businessman. Nowrosjee married Bai Jerbai who became a big philanthropist. She built five residential colonies, known as baugs, for Parsis who were unable to afford houses. These five baugs honoring her husband and three sons are: Cusrow Baug, Ness Baug, Rustom Baug, Jer Baug and Nowroze Baug; with total 1545 houses in them.

After Nowrosjee died, Bombay Dyeing was passed down to his son, Ness Wadia (later "Sir Ness" after he received a knighthood for services to the British Raj). Sir Ness became a prominent textile industrialist and played an important role during the late 19th century in turning the city of Bombay into one of the world's largest cotton trading centers. Sir Ness married an Englishwoman, Eveylne Clara Powell, and they became the parents of Clara Eveylne Wadia and Neville Wadia. Clara was married to Robert Byng, 7th Earl of Strafford. Neville inherited the conglomerate when Sir Ness Wadia died in 1952. Neville was married to Dina Jinnah from 1938 to 1943. Dina was the only child of Muhammad Ali Jinnah, the founder of Pakistan. Her mother, Rattanbai Petit, was the sister of Dinshaw Maneckji Petit, an industrialist and the brother-in-law of JRD Tata. Neville and Dina had two children together, a daughter Diana and a son Nusli Wadia, before they divorced; the divorce had to take place in England because the law in India did not permit divorce at all at that time.

Though Dina and Neville separated in 1943, they were never divorced and she remained a prominent member of the Wadia family. The fracas between Neville and his son Nusli is a part of industry folklore in India. In 1971 Neville decided to sell Bombay Dyeing because of the financial problems it was having and also because the tax in India at the time was very high and he also had plans to move the entire family to Switzerland. Nusli however stopped him as he had his own plans to run the company and did not want to leave India. He later took over as chairman of Bombay Dyeing in 1977, when Neville finally accepted that he was beaten and stepped aside. Nusli is now the chairman of the Wadia Group.

Members of the family have also settled outside of Mumbai in the United Kingdom and the United States

== Notable members ==
- Lovji Nusserwanjee Wadia (1702–1774), shipwright, founded Wadia Group in 1736.
- Jamsetjee Bomanjee Wadia (1754–1821), shipbuilder.
- Ardaseer Cursetjee (1808–1877), shipbuilder and engineer.
- Ardeshir Ruttonji Wadia - Indian author
- Dhunbai Cowasji Jehangir (1860-1940), philanthropist, leader of women's organizations
- Bahman Pestonji Wadia (1881–1958), theosophist and labour activist.
- Darashaw Nosherwan Wadia (1883–1969), geologist, winner of Padma Bhushan (1958).
- J. B. H. Wadia (1901–1986), film director, screenwriter, producer.
- Homi Wadia (1911–2004), film director, screenwriter, producer.
- Fearless Nadia (1908–1996), film actress, wife of Homi.
- Neville Wadia (1911–1996), chairman Bombay Dyeing (1952–1977).
- Dina Jinnah Wadia (1919–2017), wife of Neville, daughter of Muhammad Ali Jinnah and Rattanbai Petit.
- Nusli Wadia (born 1944), son of Neville and Dina, chairman of Bombay Dyeing since 1977.
- Jamshed "Jim" Wadia (born 1947), businessman.
- Spenta R. Wadia (born 1950), theoretical physicist, founding director of ICTS-TIFR.
- Ness Wadia (born 1971), businessman, son of Nusli.
- Jehangir Wadia (born 1973), businessman, son of Nusli.
