= Go First =

Indian low-cost India (2005–2023)

IATA	ICAO	Call sign
G8	GOW	GO AIR
- Founded: 4 November 2005; 21 years ago
- Commenced operations: 4 November 2005; 21 years ago as GoAir; 4 May 2021; 5 years ago as Go First
- Ceased operations: 3 May 2023; 3 years ago
- Operating bases: Bengaluru; Delhi; Kannur; Kolkata; Mumbai
- Fleet size: 53
- Parent company: Wadia Group
- Headquarters: Mumbai, Maharashtra, India
- Key people: Bhisham Bharadwaj (Chairman)
- Revenue: ▲₹4,553 crore (US$490 million) (FY 2017)
- Profit: ▲₹294.88 crore (US$32 million) (FY 2017)
- Website: www.gofirstcirp.com (now defunct)

Go First, founded as GoAir, was an Indian low-cost airline based in Mumbai, Maharashtra. Owned by the Indian business conglomerate Wadia Group, it commenced operations on 4 November 2005 and operated a fleet of Airbus A320 aircraft in an all-economy configuration.

In 2021, the airline planned to launch an IPO to raise ₹36 billion (US$380 million). In 2023, the airline faced difficulties with the availability of Pratt & Whitney engines used on its entire fleet of A320 aircraft, alleging that the problem was impacting its operations. Subsequently, the airline ceased operations on 3 May 2023 and filed for voluntary insolvency with the National Company Law Tribunal.

== History ==
GoAir was founded on 4 November 2005 by Jehangir Wadia, son of Indian industrialist Nusli Wadia. The airline is a wholly owned subsidiary of the Wadia Group. GoAir commenced its operations using an Airbus A320 aircraft and operated its inaugural flight from Mumbai to Ahmedabad on 4 November 2005. The airline initially operated with a single aircraft to four destinations, including Goa and Coimbatore, with plans to induct 36 aircraft by 2008. In March 2008, the airline announced revised plans to operate 11 aircraft and service new destinations in the North East and South India by the end of the year. However, increasing fuel prices forced GoAir to cut down the existing number of flights in June 2008.

In January 2009, British Airways was interested in buying a stake in the airline. In November 2009, GoAir entered into talks with Indian airline SpiceJet over a possible merger, but the discussions ended without a deal. In April 2012, GoAir became the fifth largest airline in India in terms of market share following the demise of Kingfisher Airlines. In 2013, the airline appointed investment bank JP Morgan to scout for potential investors.

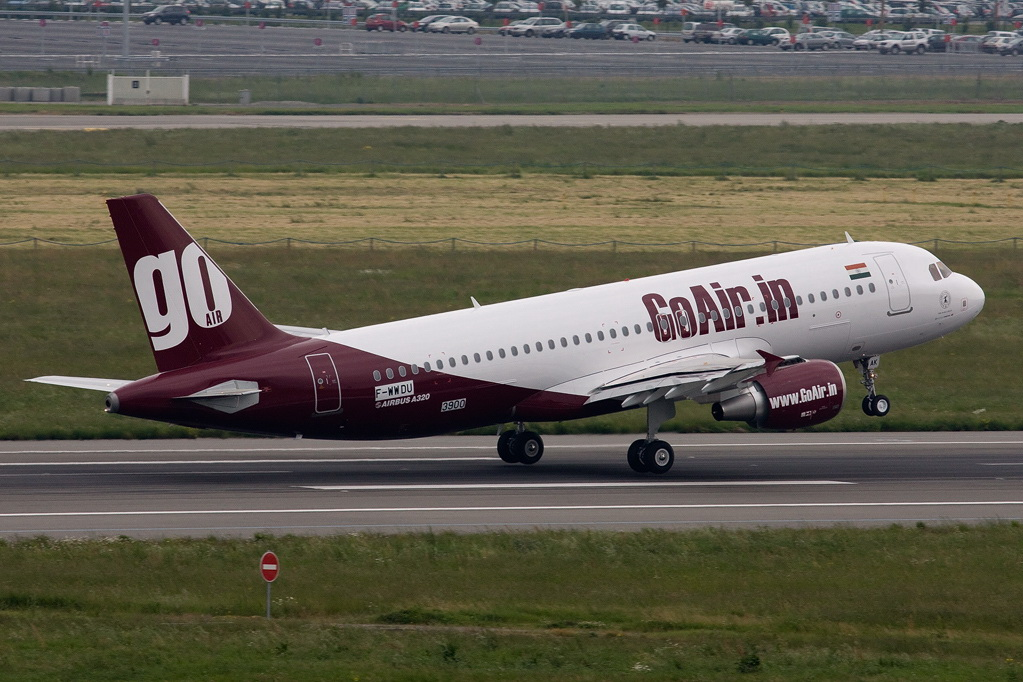
Go First Airbus A320-200 in its former GoAir livery (2011)

The airline's growth was slow compared to other airlines established around the same time, such as IndiGo and SpiceJet, which had larger market shares, fleet sizes, and more destinations served by 2016. According to the airline, it was a planned strategy due to the tough aviation environment in India, focusing on maintaining profitability rather than capturing market share or increasing the number of destinations and fleet size. In February 2016, it was the fifth-largest carrier in the country with an 8% market share. The airline was planning an initial public offering in 2016. It took delivery of its 20th aircraft in June 2016, making it eligible to operate international flights. GoAir became the sixth Indian domestic carrier to fly internationally when it launched its inaugural flight to Phuket from Delhi on 11 October 2018. On 17 March 2020, amidst the COVID-19 pandemic, GoAir suspended all its international flights. On 13 May 2021, GoAir was rebranded as Go First. In 2021, the airline once again planned to launch an IPO to raise ₹36 billion (US$380 million).

In 2023, the airline faced operational issues, resulting in the cancellation of multiple flights. The airline claimed to have been largely impacted by supply chain issues with Pratt & Whitney PW1000G engines, which power its entire fleet of Airbus A320neo aircraft. Subsequently, the airline filed for voluntary insolvency resolution before the National Company Law Tribunal (NCLT) on 2 May 2023. The airline also sued Pratt & Whitney in a United States federal court, seeking to enforce an arbitral award directing the supply of engines as contracted. Pratt & Whitney disputed these claims.

The airline sought interim directions from NCLT to continue functioning and requested restrictions on any adverse regulatory action, but this was denied. Owing to non-payment of rental dues, leasing companies repossessed the airline's leased planes. On 26 June 2023, the airline's creditors approved an interim financing of ₹425 crore (US$45 million) aimed at returning it to operation, pending board approval. In mid-August 2023, the airline sought emergency funding of ₹100 crore (US$11 million) to keep itself afloat. On 13 February 2024, it was announced that Go First had received a 60-day extension for its insolvency resolution process, allowing potential investors to submit their proposals for the carrier's revival. This was the second extension given to Go First, and also the last one it could expect. The airline attracted interest from multiple investors, including SpiceJet.

As of February 2024, Ajay Singh, the Chairman and Managing Director of SpiceJet, along with Nishant Pitti, majority stakeholder of Busy Bee Airways and co-founder of EaseMyTrip, submitted a bid for GoFirst amounting to ₹600 crore (US$64 million). The total dues of Go First—including claims from vendors and lessors—were pegged at ₹11,463 crore (US$1.2 billion), which they planned to pay off by 'monetising' two land parcel owned by Go First in Mumbai. According to the bid, Nishant Pitti would hold a majority stake of 60%, with the remaining shares held by Ajay Singh. They planned to start operations using 15 aircraft. There was also another bidder for the airline, Sharjah-based Sky One FZE.

On 1 May 2024, the Directorate General of Civil Aviation deregistered all 54 aircraft leased to Go First following a Delhi High Court order issued on 26 April. After filing for bankruptcy in May 2023, the lessors of these aircraft have since been engaged in a fierce battle with the former owner of the airline, lenders, and the resolution professional to regain control of their aircraft.

== Corporate affairs ==
The airline was headquartered in the Wadia International Center in Worli, Mumbai. Jehangir Wadia served as the managing director of the airline from its inception until his resignation in 2021. In April 2016, Wolfgang Prock-Schauer, the CEO of the airline, also became the joint Managing Director. Kaushik Khona was appointed as the CEO in August 2020, and stepped down from the position in November 2023.

=== Livery ===
GoAir aircraft were painted in various colour schemes, such as blue and pink, with the logo on the tail. In 2011, the airline announced that all its aircraft would be converted to a new, uniform, grey colour scheme. On 13 May 2021, GoAir was rebranded as Go First, with a new blue colour scheme and livery.

== Destinations ==
In March 2020, Go First operated a network of 39 destinations—29 domestic and 10 international—with 325 daily flights. In June 2016, GoAir became eligible for international operations. The airline commenced its first international operations on 11 October 2018 with a flight from Delhi to Phuket.

== Fleet ==
=== Former fleet ===
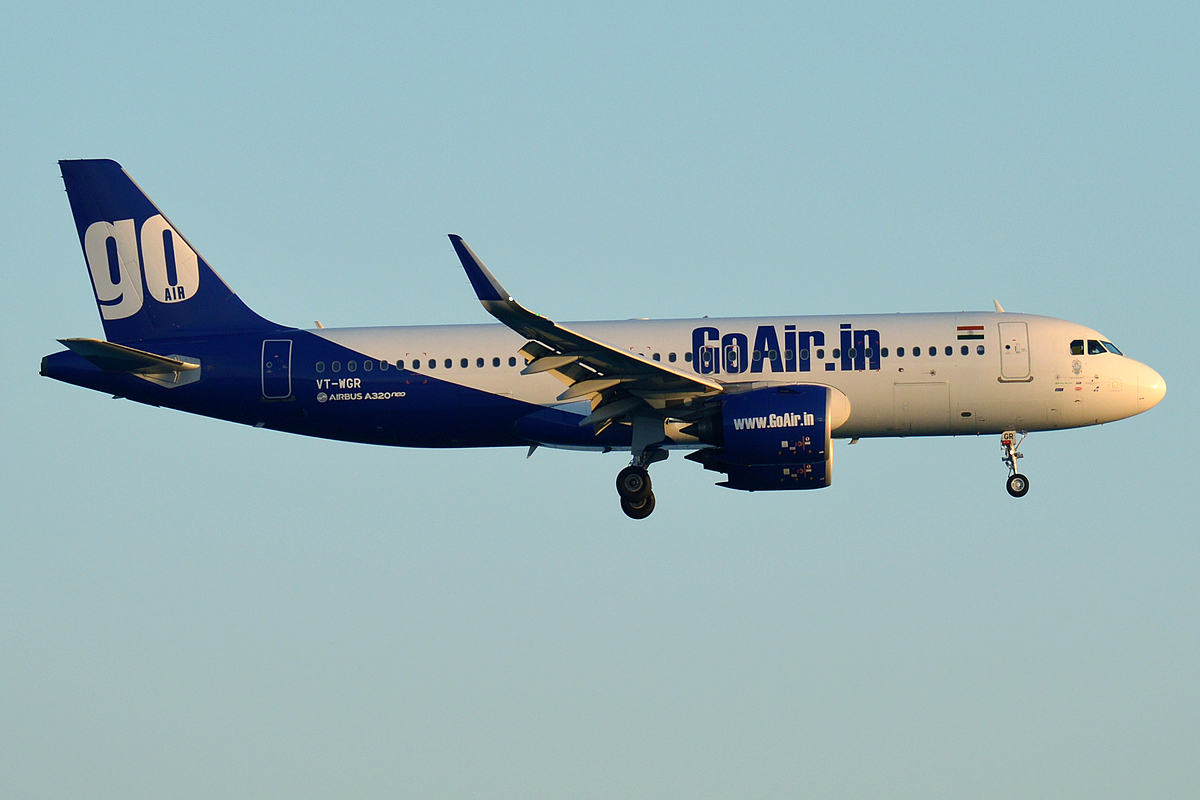
Go First Airbus A320neo in the old GoAir Livery. In 2021, the airline adapted a new livery as a part of its rebranding.

Prior to ceasing operations, Go First operated an all-Airbus A320 fleet: However, by May 2024, the DGCA initiated the deregistration process.

Aircraft	Total	Introduced	Retired	Passengers	Notes
Airbus A320-200	5	2021	2023	180	
Airbus A320neo	49	2021	2023	186	88 orders.

=== Fleet development ===
In June 2011, Go First placed an order for 72 Airbus A320neo aircraft worth ₹32,400 crore (US$3.5 billion). In December 2015, Airbus announced that the deliveries of Go First’s A320neo aircraft would be delayed by three months due to technical issues, with deliveries expected by the second quarter of the financial year 2015–16. Deliveries began in 2016, with an induction rate of 12–15 aircraft per year. Go First received its first A320neo aircraft on 1 June 2016.

In July 2016, Go First signed a memorandum of understanding with Airbus for 72 Airbus A320neo aircraft, valued at US$7.7 billion, potentially increasing the total number of orders to 144. The deal was announced at the Farnborough Airshow.

When the airline ceased operations in 2023, it had 26 aircraft operational, while the other 28 aircraft were grounded due to engine issues with Pratt & Whitney.

On 1 May 2024, following a Delhi High Court order, the DGCA deregistered all 54 leased aircraft belonging to Go Air. The first batch of the aircraft left India in July 2024, 25% left by October and 50% by December. By 28 May 2025, 41 of the aircraft departed from India. The 41st aircraft, registered as VT-WJA with the airline, departed for Tianjin as VP-COB. The 54 aircraft were parked across nine airports at the time of grounding but aircraft from five of the airports have vacated the parking bays by May 2025.

== Services ==
As a budget airline, Go First did not provide complimentary meals aboard flights but offered buy on board in-flight meal options. The airline published an in-flight magazine named Go-getter. Go First offered a premium service, Go Business, at a higher fare, which provided extra services such as seats with greater legroom, free meals, increased baggage allowance, and priority boarding. In 2011, it launched its frequent flyer programme called Go Club, offering benefits like lounge access and free upgrade to Go Business. New membership was discontinued in February 2014.

== Accolades ==
Go First was rated as the "Best Domestic Airline For Excellence in Quality and Efficient Service" by the Pacific Area Travel Writers Association in 2008. In 2011, the airline was named the "Best Performing Airline" in Asia and Africa amongst all Airbus A320 operators by Airbus, based on fleet utilisation and other performance metrics.

== See also ==
- List of defunct airlines of India
- Transport in India
