= Wadia Ghandy & Company =

- No. of offices: 5
- Major practice areas: General practice, Banking & Finance, Private Equity & Investments, Mergers & Acquisitions, Real Estate, Aviation, Media, Intellectual Property, Information Technology, Confidentiality & Privacy, Foreign Investment & Exchange Control, Insurance, Alternative Dispute Resolution, Capital Markets & Securities, Infrastructure, Insurance, General Corporate and Anti-Trust Laws
- Key people: Hamid Moochala, Ashish Ahuja, Marylou Bilawala, Bindi Dave, Dhawal Mehta, Denzil Arambhan, Shabnum Kajiji, Fariyal Tahseen, Nihas Basheer, Gopal Bankar, Gaurav Gopal, Nitesh Ranavat, Suraj Juneja, Krishna Moorthy, Dhruv Khanna, Rohini Verma, Pranaya Goyal, Akshay Gandhi, Aarish Dhunjibhoy, Anubhav Agarwal, Anant Kaushik, Pradeep Bakhru, Sharleen Lobo, Ieshan Sinha
- Revenue: $
- Date founded: 29 November 1883

Wadia Ghandy & Co., is one of the oldest law firms of India. It was founded on 29 November 1883 with an office in what was then Bombay. Presently, the main office of the firm is located at the Fort area of Mumbai spread across five floors in two buildings (N.M. Wadia Building and Kalpataru Heritage Building) adjacent to each other. It currently holds offices at Ahmedabad, Delhi, Mumbai, Pune, Jaipur and Bangalore. While it is a full service firm with partners across practice areas, it has well recognised and market leading litigation, real estate, aviation, estate planning, private equity, general corporate, intellectual property, competition and banking teams.

== History ==
The law firm was started by Framji Rustomji Wadia and Jiwaji Dinshaw Ghandy in the 1880s. The firm's "managing clerk," Ardeshir Jamshedji Chanji Mistry published memoirs of its history in 1911 and 1925, along with memoirs of the Bombay High Court in 1925. These remain rare and valuable "primary source" accounts of the everyday life of the firm and Indian legal profession at the turn of the twentieth century. Despite losing one of their senior partners Anand Bhatt in the 2008 Mumbai terrorist attack, the firm has continued to prosper. In May 2024, Wadia Ghandy & Co. was awarded in the Aviation category at the Indian Law Firm Awards 2024 by the India Business Law Journal.

== Structure ==
Wadia Ghandy is a partnership firm comprising more than 60 partners who sit in the offices spread across six cities of India. For offices other than the Mumbai office, there are junior resident partners and the partners of Mumbai have cross-partnerships in such local offices. Currently the position of managing partner of the firm is shared between the senior partners Ashish Ahuja, Dhawal Mehta, Shabnum Kajiji, Marylou Bilawala and Bindi Dave, whereas Mr. Nihas Basheer and Mr. Denzil Arambhan are the deputy managing partners.

== Articleship programme ==
The firm is well known for its article-ship training programme which is similar to the one followed in U.K (Solicitor trainee). It is a three-year programme whereby an articled clerk is assigned to a department for a year and rotated at the end of each year (Conveyancing, Corporate, Litigation; not in particular order) and thereby providing holistic training. the firm follows three round process in selecting articled clerks wherein the first round consists of shortlisting candidates on the basis of their C.V., selected candidates then proceed to the second round which consists of personal interview with the head of H.R and then the candidates selected from the second round proceed to the third round which consists of personal interview with a senior partner.
