= Britannia Industries =

Indian food and beverage company

Britannia
- Formerly: Britannia Biscuit Company Limited
- Type: Public
- Traded as: BSE: 500825; NSE: BRITANNIA
- ISIN: INE216A01030
- Industry: Food processing
- Founded: 1892; 134 years ago in Calcutta 1918; 108 years ago (as Britannia Biscuit Company Limited)
- Headquarters: Hungerford Street, Kolkata, India (registered office) Whitefield, Bangalore, India (corporate headquarters)
- Area served: Worldwide
- Key people: Nusli Wadia (Chairman); Varun Berry (Executive Vice-Chairman & MD); Rajneet Kohli (CEO); N Venkataraman (Executive Director & CFO)
- Products: Bakery products including biscuits, bread, cakes and rusk; Dairy products including milk, butter, cheese, ghee and dahi
- Revenue: ▲₹18,169 crore (US$1.9 billion) (2025)
- Operating income: ▲₹2,962 crore (US$320 million) (2025)
- Net income: ▲₹2,184 crore (US$230 million) (2025)
- Number of employees: 4,480 (2019)
- Parent: Wadia Group
- Subsidiaries: Manna Foods Private Limited; International Bakery Products Limited
- Website: www.britannia.co.in
- Footnotes; Financials as of 31 March 2025.

Britannia Industries Limited is an Indian multinational food products company, which sells biscuits, breads and dairy products. Founded in 1892, it is one of India's oldest existing companies and currently part of the Wadia Group headed by Nusli Wadia. As of 2023, about 80% of its revenues came from biscuit products.

Beginning with the circumstances of its takeover by the Wadia Group in the early 1990s, the company has been mired in several controversies connected to its management, but it continues to hold a large market share.

== History ==
The company was established in 1892 by a group of British businessmen with an initial investment of ₹295. Initially, biscuits were manufactured in a small house in central Kolkata. Later, the enterprise was acquired by the Gupta brothers, mainly Nalin Chandra Gupta, an attorney, and was operated under the name V.S. Brothers. In 1918, C.H. Holmes, an English businessman based in Kolkata, was taken on as a partner and The Britannia Biscuit Company Limited (BBCo) was launched. The Mumbai factory was set up in 1924 and Peek Freans acquired a controlling interest in BBCo. During World War II, the government of British India needed a continuous supply of biscuits for British soldiers. The Britannia Biscuit Company supplied biscuits to British Army for several years, at times devoting up to 95% of its production capacity to meet the needs of the armed forces. Biscuits were in high demand during World War II, which gave a boost to the company's sales. The company name was changed to the current Britannia Industries Limited in 1979. In 1982, the American company Nabisco acquired the parent of Peek Freans and became a major foreign shareholder. In 1978, Britannia came out with its public issue, and its Indian shareholding had increased to 62%, which firmly established Britannia as an Indian company. The 38% foreign stake was owned by the UK-based Associated Biscuits International Limited (ABIL).

Britannia logo until 2018

In 1993, textile tycoon Nusli Wadia of Bombay Dyeing took control of the company from Britannia's then-chairman Rajan Pillai, with the help of French food giant Danone. In 2009, the Wadia Group became the largest shareholder in BIL after acquiring a 25% stake owned by Group Danone.

In December 2018, it launched a new category, Treat Crème Wafers.

Britannia acquired a controlling stake in Kenya's Kenafric Biscuits in October 2022. In September 2022, Varun Berry was appointed as Executive Vice-Chairman and Managing Director of Britannia Industries Limited, and Ranjeet Kohli was also appointed Executive Director and CEO.

In December 2022, Britannia Industries entered into a joint venture agreement with Bel SA of France and Britannia Dairy Private Limited (BDPL) to develop, manufacture and sell cheese products in India and other markets. Under the joint venture, Bel SA acquired a 49% stake in BDPL, a subsidiary of Britannia Industries, for ₹262 crore and infused an additional ₹215 crore in the joint venture.

In August 2022, the company expanded its product portfolio by entering the western snacking market with the launch of its new product, Treat Croissant.

== Businesses ==
The company's principal activity is the manufacture and sale of biscuits, bread, rusk, cakes and dairy products.

=== Biscuits ===
As of 2023, about 80% of Britannia's annual revenue comes from biscuits. Britannia has an estimated market share of 33% in the organised biscuits market in India.

The company's factories have an annual capacity of 433,000 tonnes. The brand names of Britannia's biscuits include MarieGold, Tiger, Nutrichoice, Good Day, 50 50, Treat, Pure Magic, Milk Bikis, Bourbon, Nice Time and Little Hearts among others.

In 2006, Tiger, the mass market brand, realised $150.75 million in sales, including exports to the U.S. and Australia. This amounts to 20% of Britannia's revenue for that year.

=== Dairy products ===
Dairy products contribute close to 10% to Britannia's revenue. The company not only markets dairy products to the public but also trades dairy commodities business-to-business. Its dairy portfolio grew to 47% in 2000-01 and by 30% in 2001-02. Its main competitors are Nestlé India, the National Dairy Development Board (NDDB), and Amul (GCMMF).

Britannia holds an equity stake in Dynamix Dairy and outsources the bulk of its dairy products from its associate.

On 27 October 2001, Britannia announced a joint venture with Fonterra Co-operative Group of New Zealand, an integrated dairy company which handles all aspects of the value chain from procurement of milk to making value-added products such as cheese and buttermilk. Britannia intends to source most of the products from New Zealand, which they would market in India. The joint venture will allow technology transfer to Britannia. Britannia and the New Zealand Dairy each hold 49% of the JV, and the remaining 2 percent will be held by a strategic investor. Britannia has also tentatively announced that its dairy business (probably including Dynamix) would be transferred to the joint venture. However, the authorities' approval to the joint venture obliged the company to start manufacturing facilities of its own. It would not be allowed to trade, except at the wholesale level, thus pitching it in competition with Danone, which had recently established its own dairy business.

== Disputes and controversies ==
=== Wadia and Rajan Pillai ===
Kerala businessman Rajan Pillai secured control of the group in the late 1980s, becoming known in India as the 'Biscuit Raja'. In 1993, the Wadia Group acquired a stake in Associated Biscuits International (ABIL), and became an equal partner with Danone in Britannia Industries Limited.

In what The Economic Times referred to as one of [India's] most dramatic corporate sagas, Pillai ceded control to Wadia and Danone after a bitter boardroom struggle, then fled his Singapore base to India in 1995 after accusations of defrauding Britannia, and died the same year in Tihar Jail.

=== Wadia and Danone ===
The Wadias' Kalabakan Investments and Group Danone had two equal joint venture companies, Wadia BSN and United Kingdom registered Associated Biscuits International Holdings Ltd., which together held a 51 percent stake in Britannia. The ABIH tranche was acquired in 1992, while the controlling stake held by Wadia BSN was acquired in 1995. It was agreed that, in case of a deadlock between the partners, Danone was obliged to buy the Wadia BSN stake at a "fair market value". ABIH had a separate agreement signed in 1992 and was subject to British law.

Wadia was to be Danone's partner in the food and dairy business, and product launches from Groupe Danone's were expected but never materialised despite the JV being in existence for over 11 years in India. Under the 1995 joint venture agreement, Danone is prohibited from launching food brands within India without the consent of the Wadias. In addition, the partners agreed there would be the right of first refusal to buy out the remaining partner in the event of the other wishing to sell its holding.

In June 2006, Wadia claimed Danone had used the Tiger brand to launch biscuits in Bangalore. In May 2007, Nusli Wadia told the Ministry of Commerce and Industry that Danone invested in a Bangalore-based bio nutrition company, Avesthagen, in October 2006 in violation of the government's Press Note 1, 2005, which requires a foreign company to obtain the consent of its Indian joint venture partner before pursuing an independent business in a similar area, including joint ventures based purely on technical collaboration. Danone argued that Press Note 1 did not apply to it as it did not have a formal technology transfer or trademark agreement with Avesthagen, and that its 25% holding in Britannia was indirect. Wadia also filed a case in the Bombay High Court for a breach of a non-competition clause in that connection. The court ordered Danone not to alienate, encumber or sell shares of Avesthagen.

In September 2007, the Foreign Investment Promotion Board of India rejected Danone's claims that it did not need a non-compete waiver from the Wadias to enter into business in India alone.

After a prolonged legal battle, Danone agreed to sell its 25.48% stake in Britannia to Leila Lands, which is a Wadia group entity based in Mauritius, and quit this line of business. The deal was valued at $175–200 million. With this buy-out, Wadia holds a majority stake of 50.96%.

=== Intellectual property dispute ===
In a separate dispute from the shareholder matters, the company alleged in 2006 that Danone had violated its intellectual property rights in the Tiger brand by registering and using Tiger in several countries without its consent. Britannia claimed the company found out that Danone had launched the Tiger brand in Indonesia in 1998, and later in Malaysia, Singapore, Pakistan and Egypt, when it attempted to register the Tiger trademark in some of these countries in 2004. Whilst it was initially reported in December 2006 that agreement had been reached, it was reported in September 2007 that a solution remained elusive. In the meantime since Danone's biscuit business has been taken over by Kraft, the Tiger brand of biscuits in Malaysia was renamed Kraft Tiger Biscuits in September 2008.

Britannia initiated legal action against Danone in Singapore in September 2007. The dispute was resolved in 2009 with Britannia securing rights to the Tiger brand worldwide, and Danone paying ₹220 million to utilise the brand.

=== Misleading Advertisement ===
In October 2026, The Central Consumer Protection Authority has imposed a penalty of Rs 1 lakh on Britannia Industries for misleading advertisement as "100% Whole Wheat Bread" when whole wheat flour accounted for only 62% of the product.

== Partnerships ==
In March 2017, it formed a joint venture with Greek firm Chipita SA for producing and selling ready-to-eat croissants in India. In September 2021, the company partnered with Accenture to digitize the company's manufacturing units and warehouses. During the COVID-19 pandemic in India, it tied up with personal concierge startup Dunzo to deliver essential goods at the customer's doorstep in April 2020.

== Philanthropy ==
It runs a non-profit Britannia Nutrition Foundation that advocates better child nutrition and addresses child malnutrition issues in India.

== Sponsorship ==
- Indian Super League (2018–present)

== See also ==
- Parle Products
