= Ardaseer Cursetjee =

Indian technical pioneer

Ardaseer Cursetjee Wadia
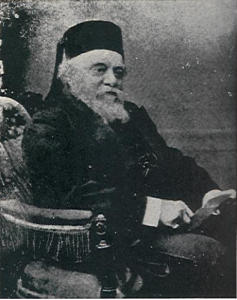
- Portrait of Cursetjee Wadia
- Born: 6 October 1808; Surat, Baroda State, Maratha Confederacy (present-day Gujarat, India)
- Died: 16 November 1877 (aged 69); Richmond, United Kingdom
- Occupation: Engineer
- Known for: Introducing gas lighting, the sewing machine, steam pump-driven irrigation and electro-plating to Bombay
- Spouse: Avabai
- Children: Lowjee Annie; Gustasp Ardaseer
- Parents: Cursetjee Rustomjee (father); Kawasjee Dorabjee Wadia (mother)
- Family: Wadia family

Ardaseer Cursetjee Wadia FRS (6 October 1808 – 16 November 1877) was an Indian Parsi shipbuilder and engineer belonging to the Wadia ship building family.

He is noted for having been the first Indian to be elected a Fellow of the Royal Society. He is also recorded as having introduced several (at the time) novel technologies to the city of Bombay (now Mumbai), including gas lighting, the sewing machine, steam pump-driven irrigation and electro-plating. He is presumed to be the first Parsi to have visited America (1851).

== Biography ==
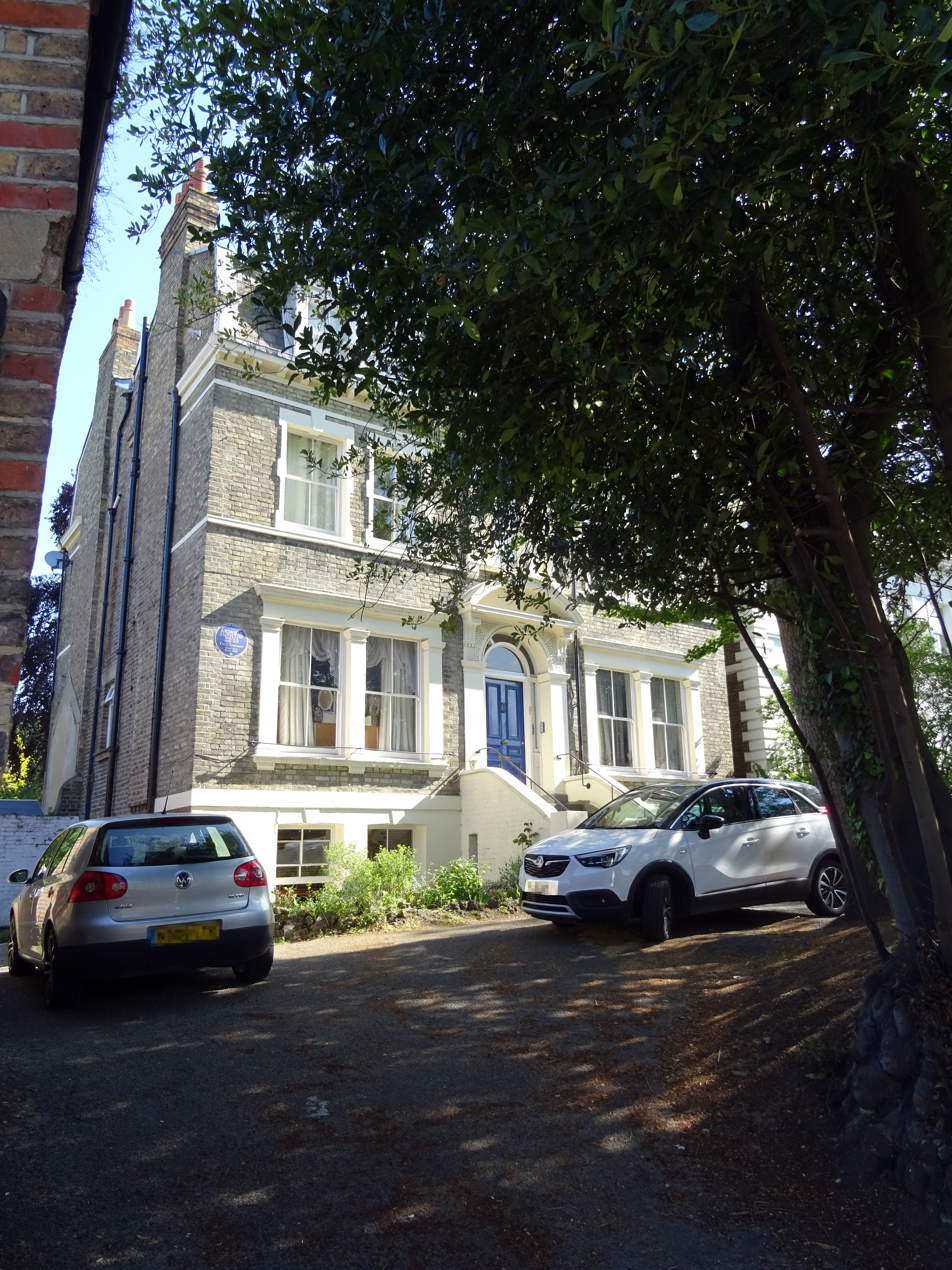
House of Ardaseer Cursetjee in London, where he lived from 1868 to 1877.

Ardaseer Cursetjee was the son of Cursetjee Rustomjee, a scion of the wealthy Wadia family of shipbuilders and naval architects, who was a ship builder at the Bombay Dockyard (today, Mumbai's Naval Dockyard). In 1822, aged 14, Ardaseer joined his father at the dockyards. He is described to have been particularly interested in steam engines. In 1833, aged 25, he designed and launched a small 60 ton ocean-going ship called Indus. This ship would subsequently warrant a mention in his nomination for the Royal Society. In 1834, in the presence of the Governor of Bombay, he had his house and gardens at Mazgaon lit using gas lighting. He married a Parsi girl, Avabai, and the couple had several children who subsequently became the initial members of the wealthy Wadia business family of India.

In 1837, Ardaseer was elected a non-resident member of the Royal Asiatic Society. In 1839, at the age of 31, he travelled overland to England to further his studies of marine steam power on behalf of the East India Company. He recounted his journey in The Diary of an Overland Journey from Bombay to England, which was published in London in 1840. While in England, he constructed a steam engine, which he then had shipped to India for installation on the Indus.

On 27 May 1841, Cursetjee was elected Fellow of the Royal Society. The nomination, made by Spencer Compton, Marquess of Northampton, the then President of the Society, describes him as a "gentleman well versed in the theory and practice of naval architecture and devoted to scientific pursuits." It credits him with both the introduction of gas lighting to Bombay, as well as having "built a [sea-going] vessel of 60 tons to which he adapted a Steam Engine." In 1855 he was elected a Justice of the Peace.

Ardaseer Cursetjee remained Chief Engineer at the Bombay Docks until 1 August 1857, when he retired. He returned to England, where he settled.

In 1858, Ardaseer made his last trip to London and decided to permanently live in the UK with his mistress, an English woman named Marian Barber. While the couple did not marry, they had children and their lineage continues to live in the United Kingdom to date. One of his descendants Blair Southerden has written books, including A Gentle Lion and other ancestors (2013) tracing back his lineage, profiling the Parsi community and their interests in ship building.

Ardaseer Cursetjee Wadia died, aged 69, on 16 November 1877 in Richmond, London.

== Family ==
Cursetjee set up home with Marian Barber (1817–1899) in England, living together although they never formally married. Marian was a British woman, from Tower Hamlets whose brother worked as a clerk in the docks of London. Together the couple had a number of children, the first of which, Lowjee Annie, was born in Bombay in December 1853. Her second child, Gustasp Ardaseer, was born in Bombay in 1856. The couple subsequently returned to UK as the Parsi community in India did not accept their marriage.

Ardaseer had a wife in India, Avabai, whom he left along with his children in India when he migrated to the UK.

For example, Cursetjee Rustomjee (1855–1941), the grandson of Avabai and Ardaseer was sent to England to study for the Indian Civil Service examination and stayed with his grandfather in Richmond. There, he met Lowjee Annie, his aunt and the daughter of Ardaseer and Marian. He married her in 1880. While their three children were all born in India, their father returned to England soon after retirement in 1911. He died in Matlock, Derbyshire in 1941.

== Commemoration ==
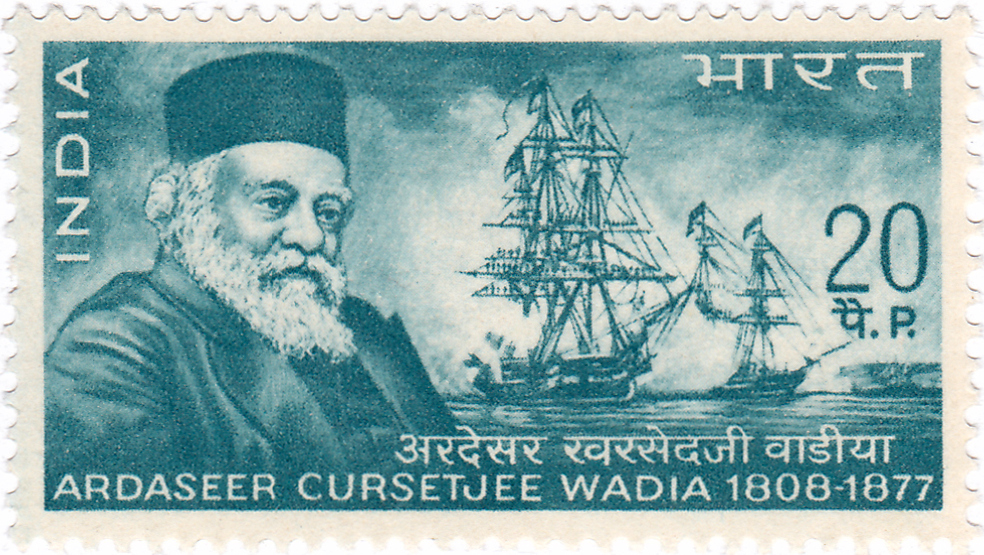
Ardaseer Cursetjee 1969 stamp of India

On 27 May 1969, the Indian Postal Service issued a commemorative stamp in recognition of his contributions as "pioneer and innovator."

His children in the UK continued to carry his name for some time. St. Mathias church in Surrey records that in 1879, one of his children, Gustasp Ardaseer, married Florence Neal.

On 19 May 2021, a blue plaque was unveiled in Ardaseer Cursetjee Wadia's honour by English Heritage at 55 Sheen Road, Richmond, London, where he settled with Marian Barber and their family for the last decade of his life, naming the property Lowgee House after his ancestral name.
