= Bombay Dyeing =

Textile company

The Bombay Dyeing & Manufacturing Company Ltd
- Type: Public
- Traded as: BSE: 500020; NSE: BOMDYEING
- Industry: Textiles
- Founded: 1879; 147 years ago
- Headquarters: Neville House, Ballard Estate, Mumbai, India
- Key people: Nusli Wadia (Chairman); Jeh Wadia
- Products: Bed linen, Towels, Furnishings
- Parent: Wadia Group
- Website: bombaydyeing.com

Bombay Dyeing & Manufacturing Company Limited is an Indian textile company headquartered in Mumbai, India. It operates as a subsidiary of the Wadia Group and is one of India's largest producers of textiles.

Its current chairman is Nusli Wadia. In March 2011, Jehangir Wadia, the younger son of Nusli, was named the managing director of the company, while the elder son, Ness Wadia resigned from the post of joint MD of the company. Ratan Tata, the ex-chairman of Tata Group was on the board of directors till 2013. He resigned and Cyrus Pallonji Mistry took over.

Bombay Dyeing was often in the news, apart from other things, for various controversies surrounding its tussle with the late Dhirubhai Ambani of Reliance Industries Limited and with Calcutta-based jute baron late Arun Bajoria.

== See also ==
- Grasim Industries
