= Dina Wadia =

Daughter of Muhammad Ali Jinnah (1919–2017)

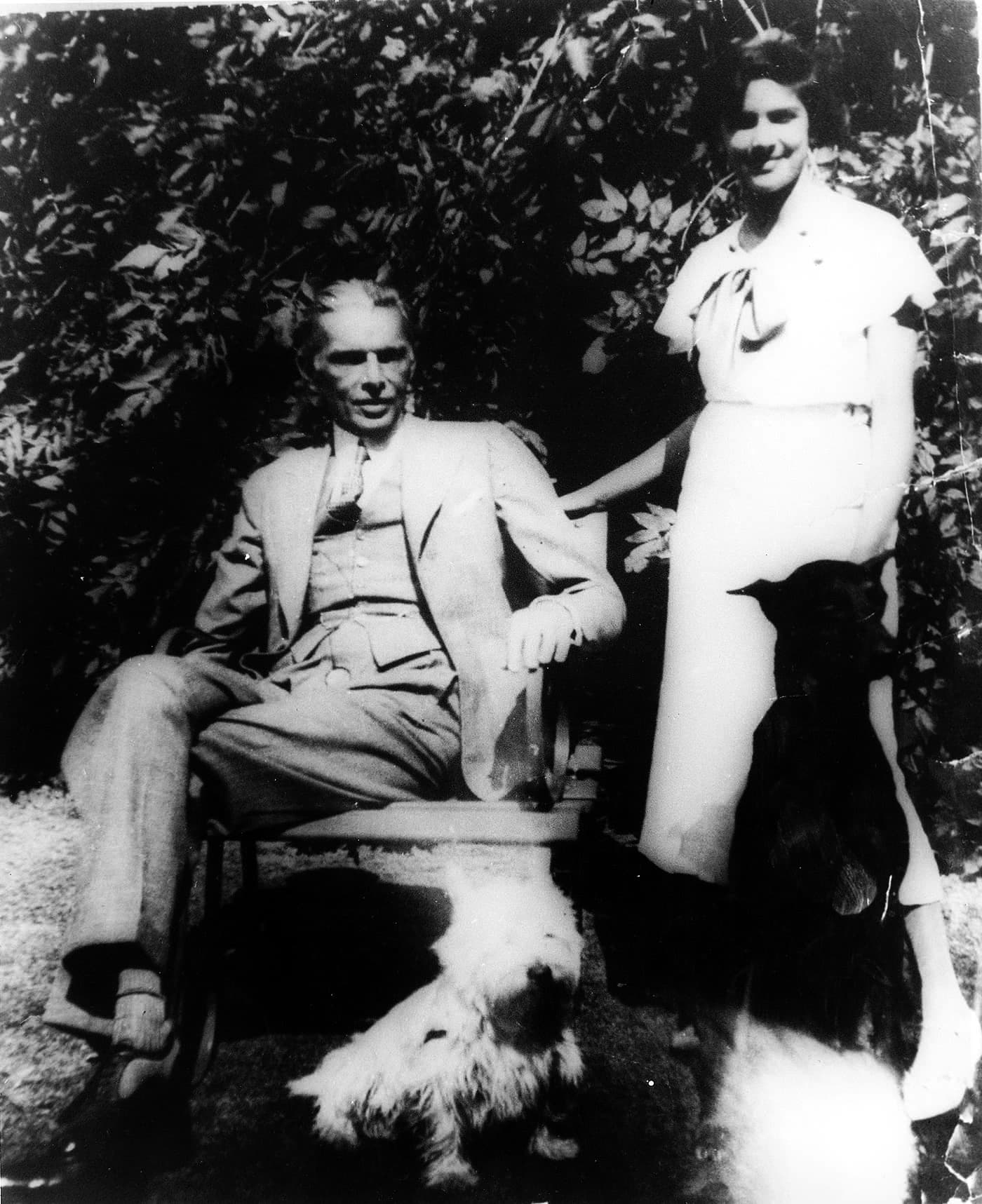
- Dina with her father, Muhammad Ali Jinnah, in 1930
- Born: Dina Jinnah; 15 August 1919; London, England
- Died: 2 November 2017 (aged 98); New York City, United States
- Spouse: Neville Wadia (m. 1938; died 1996)
- Children: 2, inc. Nusli Wadia
- Parents: Muhammad Ali Jinnah (father); Rattanbai Petit Jinnah (mother)
- Family: Jinnah; Petit; Wadia

Dina Wadia (née Jinnah; 15 August 1919 – 2 November 2017) was a British-born Indian-American who was the only daughter of Muhammad Ali Jinnah, the founder of Pakistan, and his second wife, Rattanbai Petit. Born in London, she grew up in an influential and politically active family. Her paternal family was of Gujarati heritage, while her maternal family was Parsi.

Wadia's early years were shaped by personal loss, including the death of her mother when she was young, after which she was raised by her aunt, Fatima Jinnah. She received her education in both India and England. Despite her father's significant role in the creation of Pakistan, Wadia maintained a relatively private life and chose to live in Bombay following the partition of India after which she acquired Indian citizenship. She had also spent time in London before settling in New York City later in life. She married Neville Wadia, a Bombay-based businessman, in 1938 and had two children: Nusli Wadia and Diana Wadia.

On 2 November 2017, she died at the age of 98 from pneumonia in her New York City home.

== Early life ==
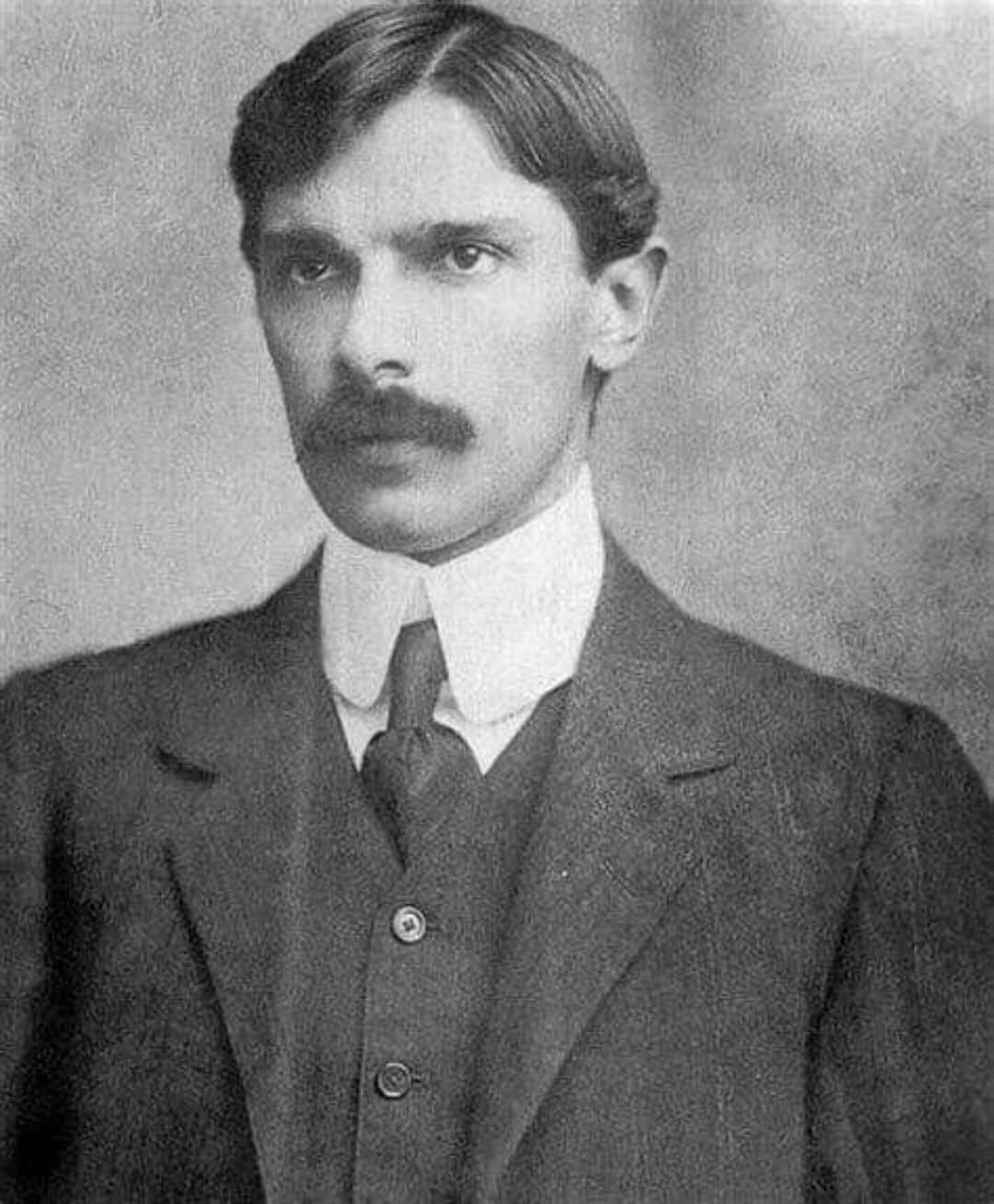
Dina's father, Muhammad Ali Jinnah

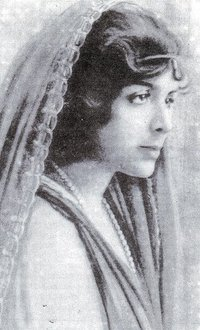
Dina's mother, Rattanbai Jinnah

Dina Jinnah was born shortly after midnight on 15 August 1919 in London. Historian Stanley Wolpert notes that her birth was "precisely twenty-eight years to the day and hour before the birth of Jinnah's other offspring, Pakistan." Her arrival was unexpected as her parents were at the cinema at the time. She was named after Lady Dinabai Petit, her maternal grandmother, who raised her. (Note: In Mr. and Mrs. Jinnah: The Marriage that Shook India, Wadia is quoted as saying "she (Lady Dinabai Petit) took over completely and brought me up" following the death of her mother.) Her parents, Muhammad Ali Jinnah and Rattanbai Jinnah, had separated in 1927.

Jinnah's paternal family were upstart merchants of high social status. Her paternal grandfather, Jinnahbhai Poonja, had moved from Gondal to Karachi in the mid-1870s. They were Gujarati Khojas, descendants of the Lohana caste, who had converted from Hinduism to the Ismaili sect of Islam and were followers the Aga Khan. Her father, Muhammad Ali Jinnah, was a lawyer and the leader of the All-India Muslim League, which called for a separate Muslim homeland following the end of British rule in India.

Jinnah's maternal family were rich, well-educated and westernized. They were Parsis who traditionally followed Zoroastrianism. Her great-grandfather, Dinshaw Maneckji Petit, founded the first cotton mill in India and earned a baronetcy for his contributions to industry, trade, and philanthropy. Her mother, Rattanbai Petit, was the only child of Sir Dinshaw Petit. Rattanbai converted to Islam to marry Muhammad Ali Jinnah on 19 April 1918, resulting in a permanent estrangement from her family and Parsi society.

In 1929, Jinnah's mother, Rattanbai, died when she was only 9 years old. That year, Jinnah moved to London with her father and aunt, Fatima Jinnah, who raised her as a Muslim, teaching her the Quran and salah. She was educated in a convent boarding school in Panchgani and a private school in Sussex. Jinnah affectionately nicknamed her father "Grey Wolf" after his admiration for the biography Grey Wolf: An Intimate Study of a Dictator on the life of Mustafa Kemal Ataturk on Mustafa Kemal Atatürk's life.

== Marriage, rift with father and reconciliation ==
My darling Papa,
First of all, I must congratulate you – we have got Pakistan, that is to say the principal has been accepted. I am so proud and happy for you – how hard you have worked for it...
I do hope you are keeping well – I get lots of news of you from the newspapers. The children are just recovering from whooping cough, it will take another month yet.
I am taking them to Juhu on Thursday for a month or so. Are you coming back here? If so, I hope you will drive out to Juhu and spend the day, if you like. Anyway, I have a phone, so I will ring you up and drive in to see you if you don’t feel like coming out.
Take care of yourself Papa darling. Lots of love & kisses,
Dina

— Wadia on Pakistan in a letter to Jinnah, 28 April 1947

On 16 November 1938, Wadia married Parsi businessman Neville Wadia, from the prominent Wadia family, at All Saints' Church. (Note: Neville was a Christian at the time of their marriage; however, later in life, and following their separation, he converted to Zoroastrianism.) Although Jinnah himself had an inter-faith marriage, he expected Wadia to marry a Muslim, which led to a strained relationship between them. He was not in attendance at the wedding ceremony. In an interview with Akbar Ahmed, she said that "he was very disapproving, and we didn’t speak for a few years."

M. C. Chagla recounted in his autobiography Roses in December that when Dina married Neville, her father said to her that she was not his daughter anymore. This story, however, is contentious as some say that Jinnah had sent a bouquet through his driver, Abdul Hai, to the newly married couple. Their relationship was a matter of legal conjecture as Pakistani laws allow for a person to be disinherited for violating Islamic rules (in this case by a Muslim woman marrying a non-Muslim), and hence no claim of hers was entertained on the Pakistani properties of Jinnah.

Following the marriage, the father-daughter relationship became extremely formal, and he addressed her formally as 'Mrs. Wadia'. This, too, is contentious as Dina rebuffed this information calling it a rumour. In an interview with Hamid Mir, she said: "My father was not a demonstrative man, but he was an affectionate father. My last meeting with him took place in Bombay in 1946. When I was about to depart, my father hugged Nusli (who was two years old then). The grey cap (Jinnah was wearing) caught Nusli’s fancy, and in a moment, my father put it on Nusli’s head, saying, 'Keep it my boy.'" After Dina's death, her personal diary revealed that her relationship with her father was no more formal, and they had reunited as a family.

The couple resided in Bombay and had two children, Nusli and Diana. They separated in 1943, after which Wadia moved to New York City.

== Later life and death ==
Wadia was living in an apartment in Madison Avenue. Despite physical distance, Nusli spoke to Wadia every day. In a 2002 interview with historian Andrew Whitehead, Wadia stated that although she had been invited to Pakistan multiple times, including by Benazir Bhutto, she declined these invitations, expressing concerns about being used as a mascot. She also warned that democracy had not been successfully established in any Muslim country and criticized leaders whom she accused of having 'robbed' the nation. In March 2004, Wadia along with her son and grandsons visited the Mazar-e-Quaid and Madar-i-Millat to pay respects to her father and aunt, respectively. In addition, she watched the last One Day International between Pakistan and India in Lahore. In a 2008 interview with Times of India, Indian actress Preity Zinta, who met Wadia several times, stated: "She carries an aura of unmistakable strength."

=== Jinnah House legal dispute ===
Wadia was involved in a legal dispute over the ownership of her father's house in Bombay, which she referred to as 'South Court'. Built in 1936, the house had been ultimately classified as evacuee property in 1948 like other property left by muhajirs following independence. Until 1982, it was leased to the British Deputy High Commission, and in 2007, Pakistani president Pervez Musharraf requested that it be converted into Pakistan's consulate. In August of that year, Wadia filed a petition before the Bombay High Court, claiming to be the rightful heir under Hindu law (which applied to Khojas). Although the court determined that Fatima Jinnah was the heir in Jinnah's will, Wadia contested this, arguing that Fatima had been declared an evacuee and was therefore ineligible to legally own property in India and the house should be transferred to Jinnah's legal heir, herself. In response, the Union government claimed the petition was not maintainable and was barred after an unexplained delay.

=== Death ===
At the age of 98, Wadia died from pneumonia in her New York City apartment on 2 November 2017. The private funeral was held in New York, with Pakistan's consulate sending the family four bouquets, signed by Shahid Khaqan Abbasi, Khawaja Asif, Mamnoon Hussain and Aizaz Ahmad Chaudhry. In a statement, Abbasi and Hussain said that she was "greatly respected and admired". Political leaders including, Naz Baloch, Imran Khan, Shah Mehmood Qureshi and Shahbaz Sharif expressed their condolences. Marriyum Aurangzeb described her as "the last symbol of our leader and nation’s founder". Preity Zinta tweeted “I was fortunate enough to have met her and really admired her.” The Sindh Assembly held a minute of silence in her remembrance and offered prayers for her and her father. Andrew Whitehead remarked that "the last remaining link with South Asia's independence era leaders has been broken."
