= Nusli Wadia =

Indian businessman and chairman of the Wadia Group (born 1944)

- Born: 15 February 1944 (age 82); Bombay, British India
- Occupation: Businessman
- Spouse: Maureen Wadia (m. 1970)
- Children: Ness Wadia; Jehangir Wadia
- Parents: Neville Wadia (father); Dina Wadia (mother)
- Family: Wadia family; Jinnah family

Nusli Neville Wadia (born 15 February 1944) is an Indian businessman. He is the chairman of the Wadia Group, a conglomerate with interests in textiles, aviation, chemicals, and real estate. His father, Neville Wadia, was a prominent businessman, and his mother, Dina Wadia, was the only child of Muhammad Ali Jinnah, the founder and the first Governor-General of Pakistan.

Wadia's early career in business saw him taking the reins of the Wadia Group, overseeing the establishment of companies like Bombay Dyeing, and his active involvement in the airline industry with GoAir.

== Early life ==
Nusli Neville Wadia was born in Bombay on 15 February 1944 to businessman Neville Wadia and Dina Wadia. On his paternal side he belongs to the prominent Parsi Wadia family; while belonging to the Jinnah family, of Gujarati Muslim background, on his maternal side.

His maternal grandfather Muhammad Ali Jinnah was the founder of Pakistan, and his grandmother, Rattanbai Petit was born into the elite Parsi family of India. His paternal grandfather, Sir Ness Wadia was a well-known textile industrialist, who played an important role during the late 19th century in turning the city of Bombay into one of the world's largest cotton trading centers. His paternal grandmother was an Englishwoman, Evelyne Clara Powell, from Yorkshire. His great-aunt was the politician and stateswoman Fatima Jinnah. His paternal aunt Clara Evelyne Wadia was married to Robert Byng, 7th Earl of Strafford. Through his parents' families, he is related to several of subcontinent’s political figures and business people.

For some time, Wadia held British citizenship by descent, as both his parents had been born in the UK. Wadia was educated at Cathedral and John Connon School. He was also educated at the Rugby School in England. In an interview in 2000 he recalled how he never liked school and was never good at school and did not like living abroad either and because of World War II there was not enough food: "English public schools in those days are very tough, and I went to a prep school in England just after the war. And I remember I know those days the war was over, there was a shortage of food in England and we used to eat horse meat. You know it wasn't exactly pleasant coming from Bombay all the way to England and the journey was a long one. Communication wasn't what it is today, so I was somewhat far away from home". Wadia later went to study in the United States, earning a PhD in chemical engineering at the University of Florida.

== Business career ==
In 1962, Nusli entered Bombay Dyeing as a trainee apprentice in the spring mills. In 1970, Nusli was appointed joint managing director. In 1971, Nusli learned that his father was planning to sell the company to R. P. Goenka because the company was failing and also because the tax in India at the time was very high and his father also had plans to move the family to Switzerland. Nusli was only 26 at the time and had his own ambitions to run the company. With the help of his mother, sister, friends, and mentor J.R.D Tata he acquired 11 per cent of the company's shares and went on to persuade the employees to pool their savings and buy shares to prevent the sale. Nusli then flew to London where his father was making the deal, and convinced him not to sell the company or emigrate. In 1977, Nusli succeeded his father as the chairman of the company.

In 2016, Wadia announced that he would be filing a defamation case against Ratan Tata and the Tata Group, after being removed as the independent director of Tata Motors. During the 2016–19 period, when the trial was ongoing, Wadia's net worth increased from US$3.5 billion to US$7 billion. In January 2020, Wadia withdrew the defamation case, following Tata's statement that there was no intention to defame Wadia.

== Political affiliation ==
According to the book Jugalbandi: The BJP Before Modi by Vinay Sitapati, Wadia was an unusual but significant donor to the Jana Sangh (the BJP's predecessor). Despite his family's political caution—his father having forbidden political involvement due to their connection to Muhammad Ali Jinnah, Nusli’s grandfather—Nusli engaged with politics after his father's death. He became involved with Jana Sangh in the late 1960s, introduced key figures like Nanaji Deshmukh to industrialist JRD Tata, and by the 1970s, was financially supporting the party.

== Attempted Assassination ==
Between 1988-89, Mumbai police, led by Arvind Inamdar, had uncovered a plot to murder Nusli Wadia, arranged by a senior executive at Reliance Industries, Kirti Ambani. Kirti Ambani allegedly hired Arjun Babaria, a bandmaster who was also known to the police as a criminal "fixer". He agreed to organize the hit for an agreed sum of ₹50 lakh. Babaria then recruited Ivan Sequeira (alias Shanoo) and Ramesh Jagothia to execute the murder.

Mumbai police carried out arrests of the accused in July 1989. In the ensuing court case, the prosecution alleged that the murder plot was an extension of the corporate rivalry between Reliance Industries and Bombay Dyeing. At the time both companies were the main manufacturers of polyester in India. The plan was for a hit squad to intercept Nusli Wadia's car as he returned from his office to his residence.

The Maharashtra government transferred the probe to the Central Bureau of Investigation (CBI) on August 2, 1989. The trial itself began in 2003. The court case of Nusli Wadia's attempted murder was mired with problems and conspiracies. Ivan Sequeira, a key accused alleged that two top executives of Reliance Industries, Jayant Shetty and Atul Dayal, were threatening him to withdraw his application to see a copy of his statement. Maneck Davar, a Mumbai based journalist, would uncover a link between the Ambani family and the then CBI Director Mohan Katre. Davar had entrapped Mohan Katre's son, Umesh Katre, into revealing how he was acting as a commission agent for Reliance Industries, specifically for selling LAB, a detergent manufacturing product. At the time, Mohan Katre was attempting to take over the case of Nusli Wadia, which led to accusations that Katre was operating in a manner biased toward Reliance.

The key accused, Kirti Ambani and Arjun Babaria would pass away before judgement could be made. Key pieces of evidence such as a cassette recordings of conversations could not be played in court due to deterioration. Special CBI judge S P Naik-Nimbalkar stated that the prosecution failed to demonstrate how Kirti Ambani was hired by his superiors to carry out the murder plot, as he would later state "insufficiency and inappropriateness of the evidence". The case ended with the acquittal of Ivan Sequeira and Ramesh Jagothia.

== Personal life ==
Wadia is married to Maureen Wadia, a former air hostess, who heads Gladrags magazine and is one of the organizers of the Mrs. India beauty pageant. They have two sons: Ness and Jehangir Wadia.

In 2004, Wadia accompanied his mother, Dina, and sons, Ness and Jehangir, on a visit to Pakistan, during which he visited the mausoleum of his grandfather, Muhammad Ali Jinnah, and great-aunt Fatima Jinnah in Karachi. Wadia and his sons are the direct and only living descendants of Muhammad Ali Jinnah.
