= Neville Wadia =

Indian businessman (1911–1996)

- Born: Neville Ness Wadia; 22 August 1911; Liverpool, England
- Died: 31 July 1996 (aged 84); Bombay, India
- Education: Malvern College; Trinity College
- Spouse: Dina Jinnah (m. 1938; sep. 1943)
- Children: Nusli Wadia; Diana N. Wadia
- Relatives: Wadia family; Jinnah family

Neville Ness Wadia (22 August 1911 – 31 July 1996) was a British-born Indian businessman, philanthropist, and member of the Wadia family, an old Parsi family which, by the 1840s, was one of the leading forces in the Indian shipbuilding industry. Wadia was the last of India's aristocratic taipans, who expanded his family textile concern into one of India's largest and donated lavishly for the welfare of the Parsee community to which he belonged.

== Life and career ==
Neville Ness Wadia was born in Liverpool on 22 August 1911 to Sir Ness Wadia and Lady Evelyne Clara Powell Wadia. He was the grandson of Nowrosjee Wadia and Bai Jerbai. Growing up Wadia's father divided his time between England and India. Wadia spent his entire youth brought up in opulence in England and was educated at Malvern College. He later graduated from Trinity College, Cambridge in 1932.

Wadia married Dina, the only child of Muhammad Ali Jinnah, the founder of Pakistan and his wife Rattanbai Petit, in 1938. The wedding was largely criticized due to being an inter-faith marriage, Dina belonged to a Muslim faith, and Wadia was a Parsi. The couple had two children, a son, Nusli Wadia, and a daughter, Diana Wadia. However, the marriage did not last long and the couple divorced in 1943.

Although his father was born a Parsi, he renounced the Zoroastrian faith and converted to Christianity. Wadia was raised as an Anglican christian and was brought up in the Church of England, but he later converted from Christianity to Zoroastrianism.

During the late 19th century, his father, Sir Ness Wadia, who was known as the Cotton King, played an important role in turning the city of Bombay into one of the world's largest cotton trading centers. In 1933, Neville was unceremoniously thrown into work at Bombay Dyeing by his father where he started working as a supervisor for loading of cotton bales on to trucks which was the most junior level in each department. He slowly worked his way to the top. He was paid no salary and given only a meagre allowance befitting a lowly employee. After his father's death in 1952, Wadia succeeded his father as chairman of Bombay Dyeing, and under his leadership the company became one of India's most successful and quality-conscious textile concerns. Wadia founded the Cotton Textiles Export Promotion Council, which he headed for 12 years. He was also heavily involved in the real estate business in Mumbai, and he contributed to building new wings and upgrading several hospitals in Bombay founded by his family. He established a business school named as Modern Education Society's Neville Wadia Institute of Management studies and Research in Pune and a host of charitable trusts for Parsees. In 1971, Neville decided to sell the company to R. P. Goenka as it was failing and because the taxes in India at the time were very high and also had plans to settle in Switzerland . However his son stopped him by garnering 11 per cent of the company shares and went on to persuade the employees to pool their savings and buy shares to prevent the sale. This made Neville change his mind of selling the company and forcing him to abandon his plans of settling abroad. After his retirement as chairman of Bombay Dyeing in 1977, he was succeeded by his son, Nusli Wadia. Neville Wadia died in Mumbai at age 84.

== Bibliography ==
- Hinnells, John R. (2005) The Zoroastrian Diaspora: Religion and Migration. Oxford University Press,. ISBN 0-19-826759-2
