= Wadia Group =

Indian multinational conglomerate

- Company type: Private
- Industry: Conglomerate
- Founded: 1736; 290 years ago
- Founder: Lovji Nusserwanjee Wadia
- Headquarters: Mumbai, Maharashtra, India
- Area served: Worldwide
- Key people: Nusli Wadia (Chairman)
- Products: Textiles; Chemicals; Food processing; Plantations; Media; Real estate
- Revenue: ▲US$2.700 billion (₹28,000 Crores)
- Total equity: ▲US$6.929 billion (₹51,400 Crores)
- Owner: Wadia family
- Subsidiaries: Britannia Industries; Bombay Dyeing; Bombay Realty; Bombay Burmah Trading Corporation; National Peroxide; Wadia Techno-Engineering
- Website: www.wadiagroup.com

Wadia Group is an Indian multinational conglomerate, founded in Surat, headquartered in Mumbai. It was founded by Lovji Nusserwanjee Wadia in 1736 and is the oldest company in India, with its subsidiary The Bombay Burmah Trading Corporation Limited, established in 1863, being the oldest publicly traded Indian company. Other notable companies of the group are Bombay Dyeing, a textile company established in 1879, and Britannia Industries, a food and beverage company established in 1918.

Lovji Wadia secured contracts with the British East India Company to build ships and docks in Bombay in 1736. This, and subsequent efforts, would result in Bombay becoming a strategic port for the British colonial undertakings in Asia. The Bombay dry dock, the first dry dock in Asia, was built by Lovji and his brother Sorabji in 1750. Among the historical ships built by the Wadia Group are HMS Minden, HMS Cornwallis, and HMS Trincomalee.

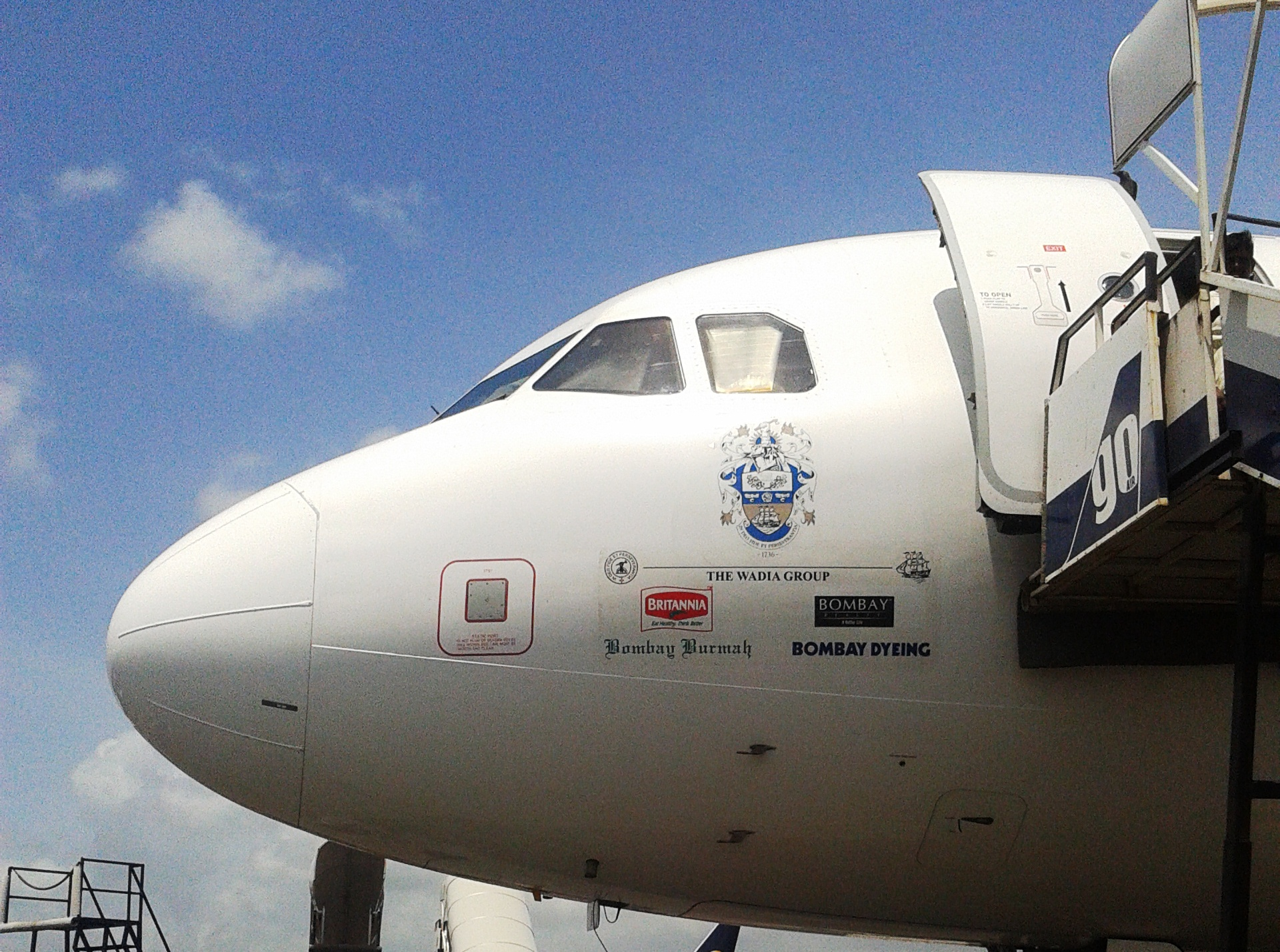
Group company logos displayed on the nose of a GoAir plane

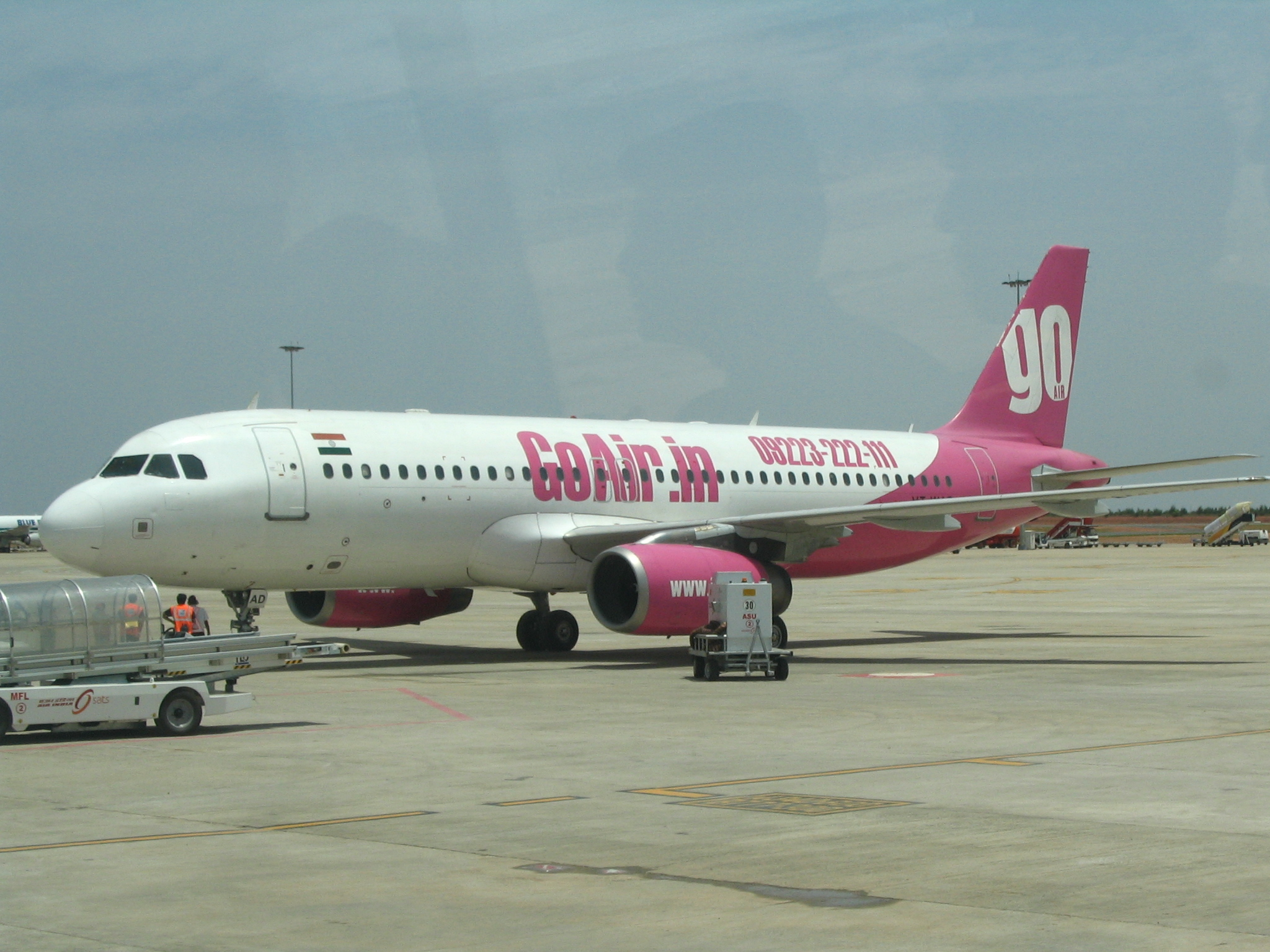
A GoAir aircraft at Bangalore International Airport, with pink colours.

== Companies ==
The Wadia group consists of several companies, four of which are listed on Indian stock exchanges.

- Bombay Dyeing – Established in 1879.
- Bombay Burmah Trading Corporation – Established in 1863.
- Britannia Industries – Established in 1918.
- National Peroxide Limited – Established in 1999.

Apart from the listed companies, Wadias own several other firms, including:

- Gladrags – a fashion magazine which is the particular interest of Maureen Wadia, a former air hostess. Established in 1959.
- Wadia Techno-Engineering Services Limited (WTESL) – Established in 1960.
- Go First – Established in 2005.
- Punjab Kings – a cricket team, one of the ten franchisees playing in the Indian Premier League. Established in 2008.
- Bombay Realty – Established in 2011.

== See also ==
- Wadia family
- List of oldest companies in India
- List of oldest companies
