= Yahya (name) =

- Gender: Male (given name) Unisex (surname)

Origin
- Origin: Arabic
- Region of origin: Arabia

Other names
- Related names: Jehiah, Yohanan, John, Evan, Giovanni, Hans, Hovhannes, Ian, Ioan, Ioane, Ioannis, Ivan, Iven, Ifan, Jack, Jackson, Jan, Jane, Janez, Jean, Jhon, Joan, João, Johan, Johannes, Jonne, Jovan, Juan, Juhani, Seán, Shane, Siôn, Yohannes

Yahya, Yahyo, or Yahiya (Arabic: يحيى, romanized: Yaḥyā) is a masculine given name and surname of Arabic origin. In the Qur'an, Yahya also appears as the Arabic equivalent of the given name of the prophet John the Baptist in Islam. (Note: The other Arabic form of the given name John is Yūḥannā يوحنا, which is the form directly derived from the original name, Hebrew: יְהוֹחָנָן. Both translated and transliterated names similarly coexisted amongst Hellenistic Jews such as the Greek name Σίμων Símōn, being used for the Hebrew שִׁמְעוֹן Šimʻôn, as well as the Greek transliteration Συμεών Symeṓn. A notable example using the Arabic transliterated form of John is the Arab Christian John of Damascus' name, Yūḥana al-Dimashqī.) For this reason, Yahya is now a common name in the Muslim world. Etymologically unrelated, it was used as an Arabic equivalent of the Hebrew given name Yohanan (Hebrew: יְהוֹחָנָן, romanized: Yəhoḥānān, lit. 'Yahweh is gracious'), or John, as attested in pre-Islamic Arabian Jewish inscriptions: The related Biblical name of Jehiah (Hebrew: יְחִיָּה, romanized: Yəḥiyā, lit. 'Yahweh lives') has the Arabic form Yaḥiyyā (Arabic: يَحِيَّى). Notable people with the name include:

== Given name ==
=== Yahiya ===
- Yahiya Doumbia (born 1963), Senegalese tennis player
- Yahiya Emerick (1971–2026), American Islamic scholar and educator

=== Yahya ===
- Yahya A. Muhaimin (1943–2022), Indonesian politician
- Yahya Abdallah al-Ubaydi (died 2003), Iraqi politician
- Yahya Abdul-Mateen II (born 1986), American actor
- Yahya Abdullah Mohammed Hamad (born 1968), Sudanese academic
- Yahya Adl (1908–2003), Iranian surgeon
- Yahya Afridi (born 1965), Pakistani jurist
- Yahya Ahmad (cyclist) (born 1954), Malaysian cyclist
- Yahya Al Bishri (born 1962), Saudi fashion designer
- Yahya Al Khusaibi, Omani politician
- Yahya al-Abyadh, Yemeni politician
- Yahya al-Bahrumi (1983–2017), American jihadist and Islamic scholar
- Yahya Al-Ghahes (born 1986), Saudi sprinter
- Yahya Al-Ghassani (born 1998), Emirati footballer
- Yahya Al-Ghotany (born 2004), Syrian taekwondo practitioner
- Yahya al-Hajuri (born 1958), Yemeni Islamic scholar
- Yahya Al-Hamud (born 1960), Saudi politician
- Yahya Al-Musalem (born 1987), Saudi footballer
- Yahya al-Mu'tasim (died 1236), Almohad rival caliph
- Yahya Al-Mutawakel (born 1959), Yemeni politician
- Yahya Al-Najei (born 1999), Saudi footballer
- Yahya al-Qadir (died 1092), Dhulnunid ruler of the Taifa of Toledo
- Yahya Al-Qarni (born 1998), Saudi footballer
- Yahya Al-Sarraj (born 1962), Palestinian politician
- Yahya Al-Shehri (born 1990), Saudi footballer
- Yahya al-Shirvani al-Bakubi (died 1462), Sufi mystic from Shamakhi
- Yahya Ale Eshaq (born 1949), Iranian politician
- Yahya Ali al-Raee (born 1953), Yemeni politician
- Yahya Alkafri, Syrian television and voice actor
- Yahya Alwan (born 1956), Iraqi footballer
- Yahya Amer (born 1960), Saudi footballer
- Yahya Armajani (1908–1991), Iranian-American academic
- Yahya Ashour (born 1998), Palestinian poet and educator
- Yahya Assiri (born 1980), Saudi human rights activist
- Yahya Atan (1954–2022), Malaysian field hockey player
- Yahya Attiyat Allah (born 1995), Moroccan footballer
- Yahya Awang (born 1950), Malaysian cardiothoracic surgeon
- Yahya Ayyash (1966–1996), Palestinian militant
- Yahya Bakar (born 1954), Bruneian aristocrat and politician
- Yahya Bakhtiar (1921–2003), Pakistani lawyer and politician
- Yahya Barzaq (died 2025), Cypriot-Palestinian freelance photojournalist
- Yahya Baş (1952–2023), Turkish politician
- Yahya Bennani (born 1962), Moroccan diplomat
- Yahya Berrabah (born 1981), Moroccan long jumper
- Yahya bey Dukagjini (1488–1582), Ottoman poet
- Yahya Bihram (1811–??), Mandaean priest
- Yahya bin Ahmad Sirhindi, Persian writer
- Yahya bin Mahfoudh al-Mantheri (born 1949), Omani politician
- Yahya bin Muhammad as-Siraji (died 1296), imam of the Zaidi state in Yemen
- Yahya Black (born 2002), American football player
- Yahya Boumediene (born 1990), Belgian-Moroccan footballer
- Yahya Boussakou (born 2000), Dutch footballer
- Yahya Butt (1965–2022), Pakistani bodybuilder
- Yahya Cholil Staquf (born 1966), Indonesian politician
- Yahya Chowdhury (born 1964), Bangladeshi politician
- Yahya Dagriri (born 1991), Saudi footballer
- Yahya Dehghanpour (1941–2026), Iranian photographer, photography educator, and writer
- Yahya Diab, Syrian diplomat and human rights lawyer
- Yahya Efendi (1494–1570), Ottoman Islamic scholar, sufi sheikh, and poet
- Yahya El Hindi (born 1998), Lebanese footballer
- Yahya El Mashad (1932–1980), Egyptian nuclear scientist
- Yahya Elnawasany (born 2002), Egyptian squash player
- Yahya Farhan (born 1976), Arab-Israeli criminal and suspected serial killer
- Yahya Galip Kargı (1874–1942), Turkish politician
- Yahya Genc (born 1974), Austrian football manager and player
- Yahya Ghaffari, Qajar royal court painters
- Yahya Golmohammadi (born 1971), Iranian footballer
- Yahya Habeeb (born 1986), Saudi track and field athlete
- Yahya Hammuda (1908–2006), Palestinian politician
- Yahya Haqqi (1905–1992), Egyptian writer and novelist
- Yahya Harahap (1934–2024), Indonesian jurist
- Yahya Hassan (1995–2020), Palestinian-Danish poet and political activist
- Yahya Hawwa (born 1976), Syrian artist
- Yahya Hendi, American Muslim chaplain
- Yahya Hussain Al-Aarashi (born 1947), Yemeni diplomat and politician
- Yahya ibn Abd al-Aziz (died 1152), ruler of the Hammadids
- Yahya ibn Abd al-Latif Hoseyni Qazvini (1481–1555), Iranian writer and historian
- Yahya ibn Abdallah (745/46–803), Alid and Zaydi leader
- Yahya ibn Abi Mansur (died 830), Persian official
- Yahya ibn Adam (757–818), Iraqi Islamic scholar, Hafiz, Quran reciter, and jurist
- Yahya ibn Adi (893–974), Syriac philosopher, theologian, and translator
- Yahya ibn Aktham (died 857), Arab Islamic jurist
- Yahya ibn al-Batriq, Arab scholar
- Yahya ibn al-Hakam, Umayyad statesman
- Yahya ibn al-Mundhir (died 1036), ruler of the Taifa of Zaragoza
- Yahya ibn al-Qasim (died 905), Idrisid ruler of Morocco
- Yahya ibn Ali al-Tanukhi (1051–1105), Syrian chronicler
- Yahya ibn Ali ibn Hammud al-Mu'tali (died 1035), Caliph of Cordoba in the Hammudid dynasty
- Yahya ibn Asad (died 855), Samanid ruler of Shash and Samarkand
- Yahya ibn Ghaniya (died 1148), governor of Valencia, Murcia, and al-Andalus
- Yahya Ibn Ibrahim, one of the founders of the Almoravid dynasty
- Yahya ibn Idris ibn Umar (died 946), Idrisid ruler of Morocco
- Yahya ibn Jarir, Syriac physician and scholar
- Yahya ibn Khaldun (1333–1378/79), Tunisian historian
- Yahya ibn Khalid (died 806), Vizier of the Barmakids
- Yahya ibn Mahmud al-Wasiti, Iraqi painter and calligrapher
- Yahya ibn Ma'in (774–847), Persian Islamic scholar
- Yahya ibn Mu'adh al-Razi (830–871), Iranian Sufi
- Yahya ibn Mu'adh ibn Muslim (died 821/22), governor for the Abbasid Caliphate
- Yahya ibn Muhammad (829–863), Idrisid ruler of Morocco
- Yahya ibn Sa'd, Arab Tabi'een
- Yahya ibn Sa'id al-Harashi, military commander and official for the Abbasid Caliphate
- Yahya ibn Sa'id al-Qattan (738–813), Iraqi hadith scholar
- Yahya ibn Salama al-Kalbi, governor of al-Andalus
- Yahya ibn Sarafyun, Arab medical writer
- Yahya ibn Surur (died 1838), sharif of the Zayd clan
- Yahya ibn Tamim (1065–1116), Zirid ruler of Ifriqiya
- Yahya ibn Umar (died 864), Alid imam
- Yahya ibn Umar al-Lamtuni (died 1056), Emir of the Almoravids
- Yahya ibn Yahya (died 866), Idrisid ruler Morocco
- Yahya ibn Yahya al-Ghassani (684–??), Umayyad governor of Mosul
- Yahya ibn Yahya al-Laythi (769–848), Andalusian scholar and hadith specialist
- Yahya ibn Yahya al-Tamimi (759–841), Iranian Islamic Sunni Muhaddith
- Yahya ibn Zakarawayh (died 902), Qarmatian leader in the Syrian Desert
- Yahya ibn Zayd (725/26–743), Zaydi imam
- Yahya Ibrahim (1939–2022), Bruneian aristocrat, Shariah judge, poet, and politician
- Yahya Ibrahim Pasha (1861–1936), Egyptian politician
- Yahya II al-Wathiq (died 1279), Sultan of the Hafsid Sultanate
- Yahya Jabrane (born 1991), Moroccan footballer
- Yahya Jammeh (born 1965), Gambian politician
- Yahya Kabi (born 1987), Saudi footballer
- Yahya Kalley (born 2001), Swedish footballer
- Yahya Kanu (died 1992), Sierra Leonean politician
- Yahya Karawi (died 1355/56), leader of the Sarbadars of Sabzewar
- Yahya Kassim Issa (born 1950), Tanzanian politician
- Yahya Kemal Beyatlı (1884–1958), Turkish poet, author, politician, and diplomat
- Yahya Khan (1917–1980), Pakistani general and politician
- Yahya Khan (cricketer), Afghan cricketer
- Yahya Khan (governor), Mughal governor of Lahore Subah
- Yahya Kharmi (born 1998), Saudi footballer
- Yahya Kisbi (born 1949), Jordanian politician
- Yahya Lampong (1940–2026), Malaysian politician
- Yahya Mahmassani (born 1935), Lebanese diplomat
- Yahya Maroofi (born 1939), Afghan diplomat
- Yahya Merchant (1903–1990), Indian architect
- Yahya Modarresi (born 1945), Iranian linguist
- Yahya Mohamed Abdullah Saleh (born 1965), Yemeni politician
- Yahya Muhammad al-Wareeth, imam of the Mutawakkilite Kingdom of Yemen
- Yahya Muhammad Hamid ed-Din (1869–1948), Yemeni king and imam
- Yahya Nadrani (born 1997), French footballer
- Yahya Nouri, Iranian Shia cleric and missionary activist
- Yahya of Antioch, Arab historian
- Yahya Otain (born 1990), Saudi footballer
- Yahya Ould Ahmed El Waghef (born 1960), Mauritanian politician
- Yahya Ould Hademine (born 1953), Mauritanian engineer and politician
- Yahya Petra of Kelantan (1917–1979), King of Malaysia
- Yahya Qassim (born 1971), Saudi writer
- Yahya Rahim Safavi (born 1958), Iranian Army officer
- Yahya Rahmat-Samii (born 1948), Iranian-American academic
- Yahya Sadeq Vaziri (1911–2013), Iranian politician
- Yahya Saleh, Mughal Admiral and voyager
- Yahya Saree (born 1970), Yemeni military officer
- Yahya Shurbaji (born 1979), Syrian political activist
- Yahya Sinwar (1962–2024), Palestinian politician and militant
- Yahya Skaf, Lebanese alleged terrorist
- Yahya Sobeih (died 2025), Palestinian journalist, editor, and reporter
- Yahya Sulong (1928–2013), Malaysian comedian and actor
- Yahya Sunbul (born 1998), Saudi footballer
- Yahya Syed, Bangladeshi Navy commodore
- Yahya Taher Abdullah (1942–1981), Egyptian writer
- Yahya Toor (born 1962), Pakistani cricketer
- Yahya u-Ta'fuft (died 1520), Moroccan alcaide of the Doukkala region
- Yahya Yahya (born 1967), Moroccan politician
- Yahya Yakhlif (born 1944), Palestinian politician, writer, novelist, and journalist
- Yahya Zaini (born 1964), Indonesian politician
- Yahya Zayd (born 1996), Tanzanian footballer
- Yahya-Hadji Zhangurazov (1870–1934), Russian Islamic scholar, community leader, and national hero
- Yahyah Michot (1952–2025), Belgian Islamic scholar and academic

=== Yahyo ===
- Yahyo Azimov (born 1947), Tajik politician

== Surname ==
- Abu Hafs Umar bin Yahya (died 1295), Hafsid caliph of Ifriqiya
- Abu Yahya Abu Bakr ash-Shahid (died 1309), Hafsid caliph of Ifriqiya
- Abu Yahya ibn Abd al-Haqq (died 1258), Marinid emir
- Abu Zakariya Yahya (1203–1249), sultan of the Hafsid dynasty in Ifriqiya
- Ahmad bin Yahya (1891–1962), Yemeni imam
- Ali Yahya (1947–2014), Israeli-Arab diplomat
- Izz al-Din Yahya (died 1338), ruler of Satgaon, Bengal
- Tahir Yahya (1956–2007), Iraqi politician
- Umm Hakim bint Yahya, wife of caliph Hisham
- Yaghmurasen ibn Zyan (1206–1283), sultan of the Kingdom of Tlemcen
- Yaish Ibn Yahya (died 1196), Portuguese military leader

== See also ==
- Yahyaabad (disambiguation)
