= Yahyaabad =

Yahyaabad (Persian: يحيي اباد) may refer to:

== Fars province ==
- Yahyaabad, Rostam, a village in Rostam County
- Yahyaabad, Sepidan, a village in Sepidan County

== Isfahan province ==
- Yahyaabad, Isfahan, a village in Isfahan County
- Yahyaabad, Kashan, a village in Kashan County
- Yahyaabad, Natanz, a village in Natanz County
- Yahyaabad, Shahreza, a village in Shahreza County

== Kerman province ==
- Yahyaabad, Sirjan, a village in Sirjan County
- Yahyaabad, Pariz, a village in Sirjan County

== Markazi province ==
- Yahyaabad, Markazi

== Qazvin province ==
- Yahyaabad, Qazvin

== Razavi Khorasan province ==
- Yahyaabad, Bardaskan
- Yahyaabad, Fariman
- Yahyaabad, Jowayin
- Yahyaabad, Khoshab
- Yahyaabad, Sabzevar
- Yahyaabad, Torbat-e Heydarieh
- Yahyaabad, Fazl, Nishapur County

== Zanjan province ==
- Yahyaabad, Zanjan, a village in Zanjan County
