= Raudat Tahera =

Mausoleum of Syedna Taher Saifuddin in Mumbai

- روضة طاهرة
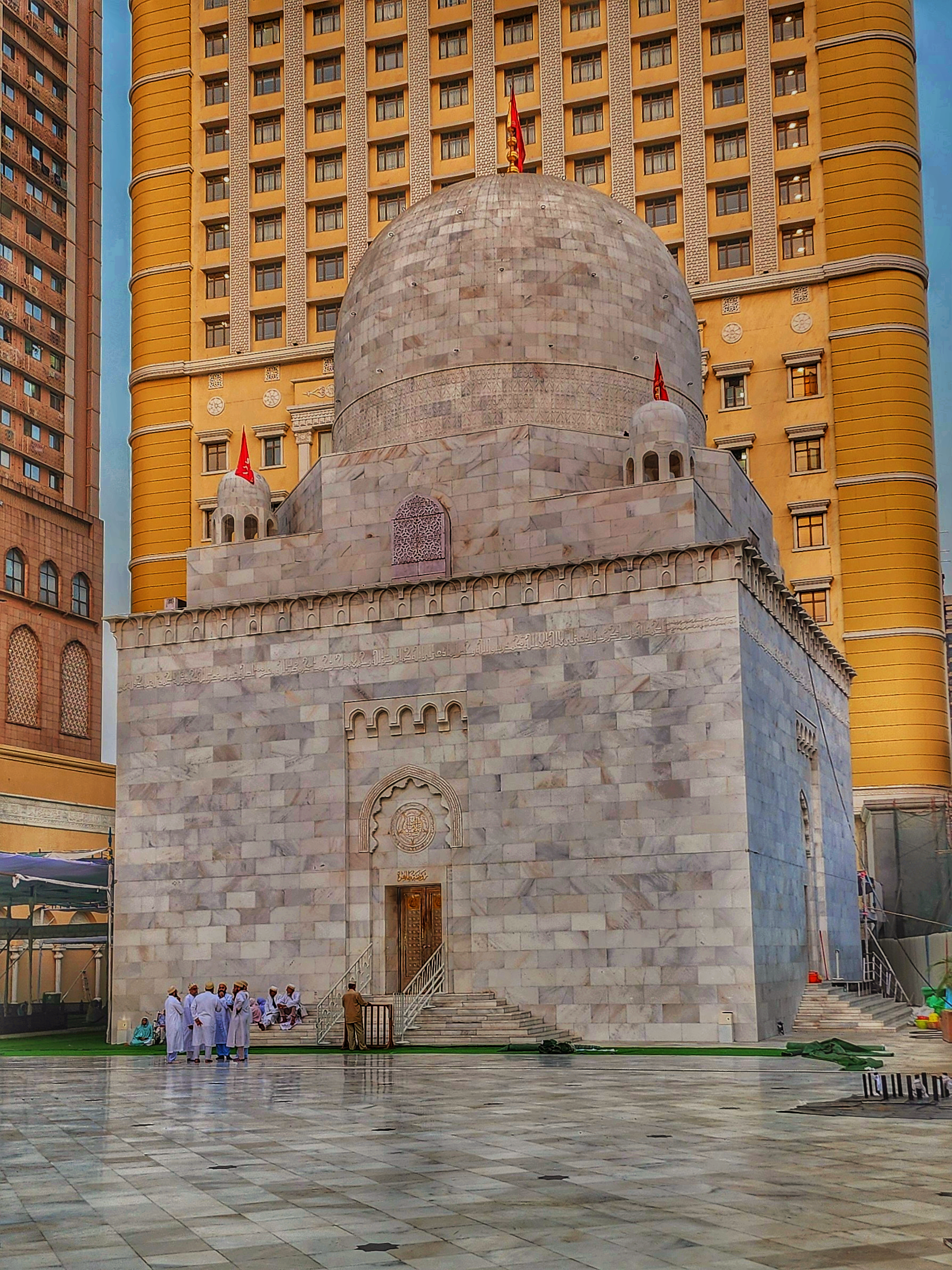
- Raudat Tahera in Mumbai, India

- Location within Mumbai Location within Maharashtra Location within India

Religion
- Affiliation: Islam
- Sect: Dawoodi Bohra
- Rite: Dawoodi Bohra

Location
- Location: Bhendi Bazaar, Mumbai
- State: Maharashtra
- Country: India
- Coordinates: 18°57′32″N 72°49′52″E

Raudat Tahera (Arabic: روضة طاهرة Rawḍat Ṭāhira) is the mausoleum of Syedna Taher Saifuddin and his son and successor Syedna Mohammed Burhanuddin, the 51st and 52nd Dāʿī al-Mutlaqs of the Dawoodi Bohra Ismaili Muslims. It is located in the Bhendi Bazaar, Mumbai.

Syedna Taher Saifuddin led the Dawoodi Bohra community from 27 January 1915 until he died on 12 November 1965. He was succeeded by his son, Syedna Mohammed Burhanuddin, who led the community from 12 November 1965 until he died 17 January 2014.

== Geography ==
The white-marbled Fatemi shrine is located in the midst of Bhendi Bazaar, a crowded area in central Mumbai. It was constructed by Syedna Mohammed Burhanuddin, and its architect was Yahya Merchant, who also designed the Mazar-e-Quaid in Karachi, Pakistan.

== History ==
Construction on Rawdat Tahera began on 10 December 1968, which coincided with the date of 21 Ramadan 1388 of the Fatimid Calendar, the death anniversary of Ali, and was inaugurated on 15 April 1975 by the president coinciding with the birthday celebrations of the 21st Fatimid Imam, aṭ-Ṭayyib Abī l-Qāṣim ibn al-Manṣūr, on 4 Rabi' al-thani 1395.

== Exterior features ==
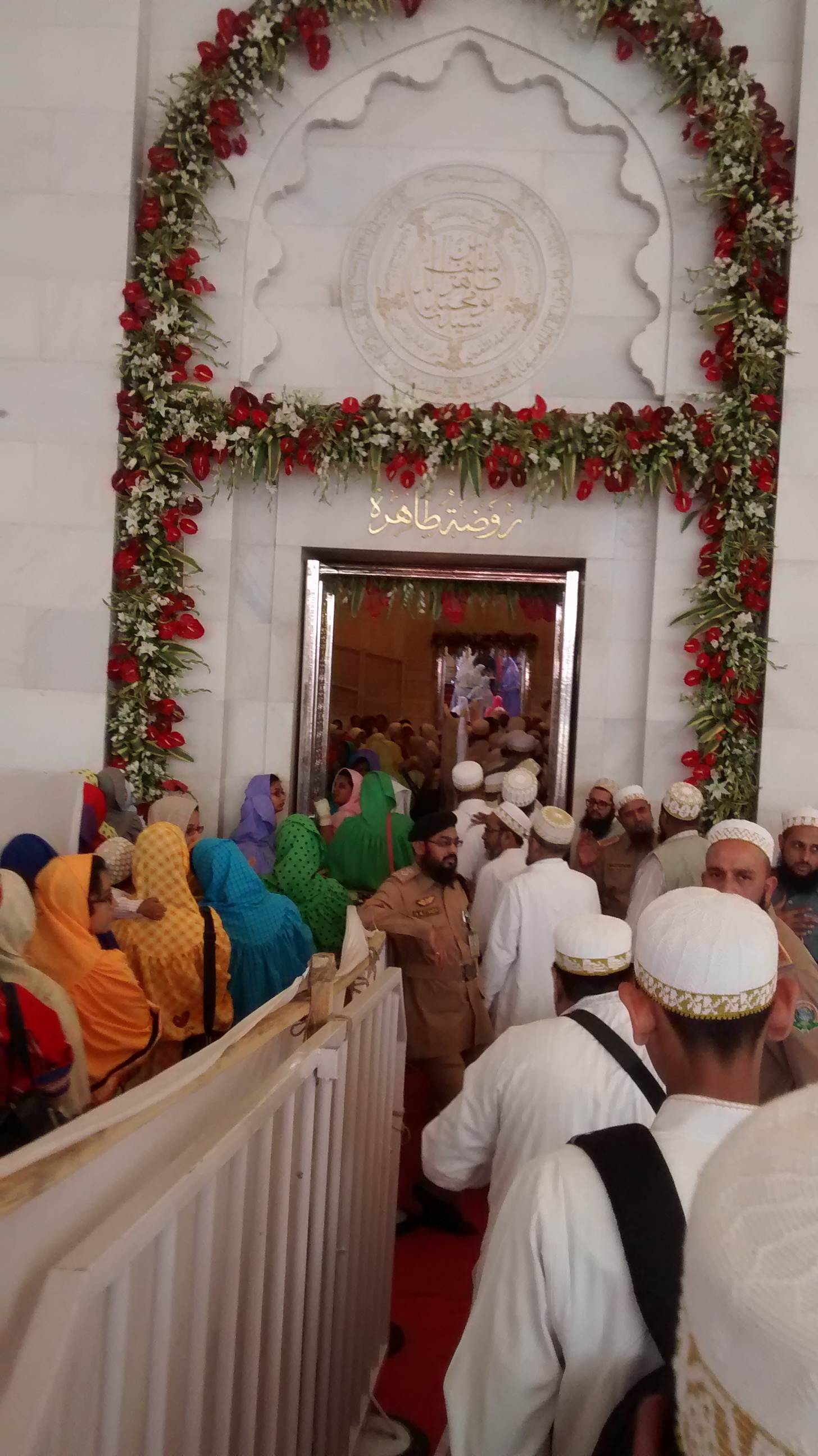
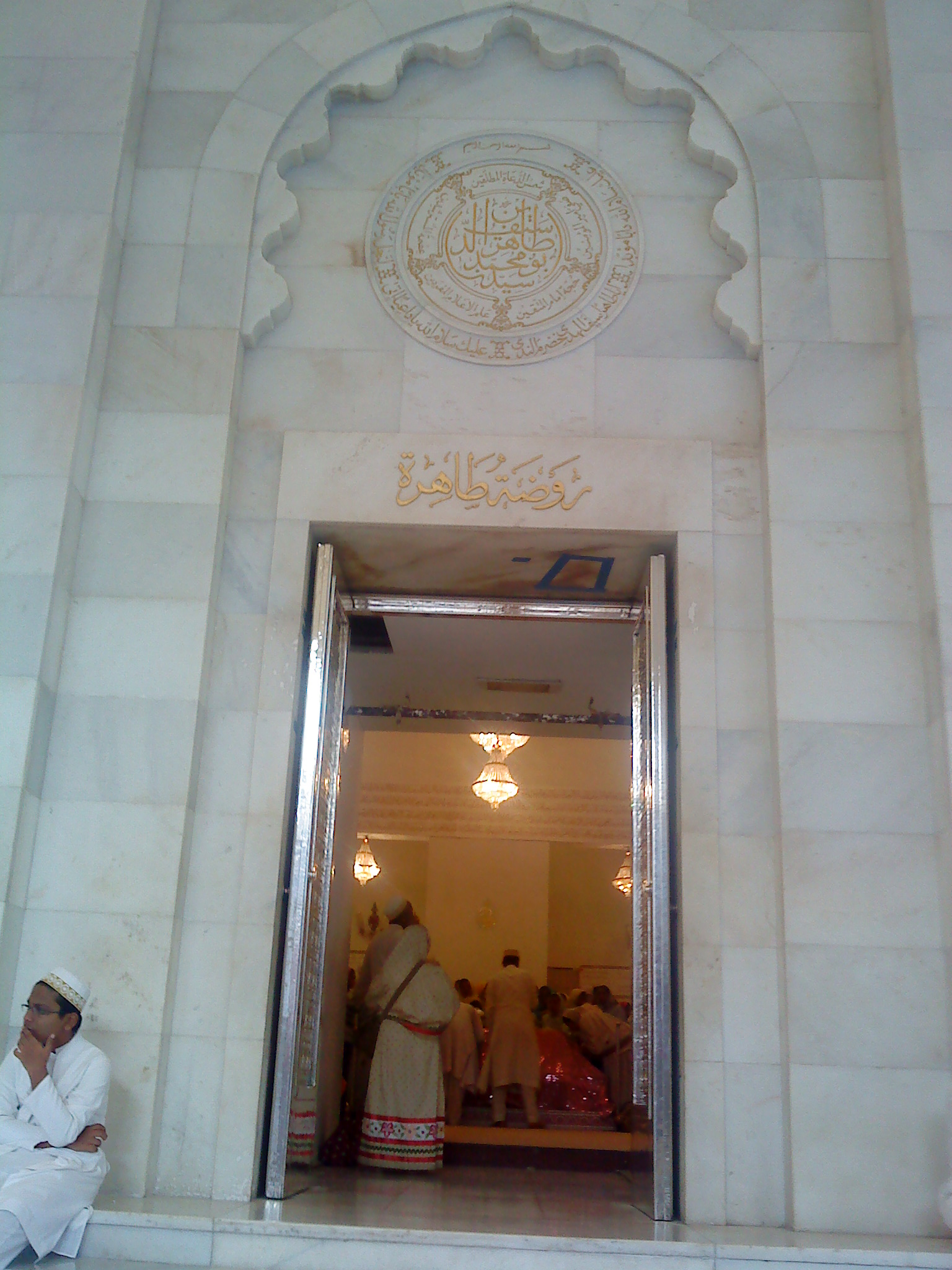
Left: Followers lining up to pay their respects on the first death anniversary of Mohammed Burhanuddin in 2014. Right: Qabr mubarak of Taher Saifuddin and Mohammed Burhanuddin as seen from an entrance to the mausoleum.
- The marble used in the mausoleum was quarried from the Chosira and Ulodi quarries of the Makrana quarries in Rajasthan, India, from where marble for Taj Mahal was quarried.
- The mausoleum rests on 92 piles. The number 92 is significant in that it represents the Arabic addad value of the name of Muhammad.
- The complete structure weighs 5000 tons.
- The mausoleum rises to a height of 108 feet (33 m), which is the Arabic isopsephical value of the word Ḥaqq (righteous).
- The dome is 52 feet (16 m) high as its crowning feature.
- A 12 feet (3.7 m) high gold finial stands sentinel over the dome.
- There are four smaller domes, one at each corner of the central dome, each with a gold finial to match its larger prototype, and perfect the setting against the azure sky. The dome and cornice are inspirations from the Juyushi Mosque, Cairo.
- The four walls of the mausoleum have a 4 feet (1.2 m) and 6 inches (15 cm) thick masonry wall, with 3 inches (7.6 cm) cladding on both sides, making its final thickness of 5 feet (1.5 m), which reflects the members of Ahl al-Bayt.
- The outer walls are decorated with the names of the Ahl al-Bayt and the Fatimid Imams as well as the Duʿāt Mutlaqīn in the Kufic script.
- The four entrance doors to the shrine have been specially designed to match the entrance gate of Aqmar Mosque in Cairo built by Imam-Caliph Manṣūr al-Āmir bi Aḥkām Allāh. The entrances are adorned with four silver doors of Fatimid style and lead to the sanctum sanctorum of the tomb. There are five arches above each of these four doors.
  - The entrance facing west is called Raudat Tahera
  - The entrance facing east is called Bab-e Hakimi, so named after his ancestor, Syedi Abdul Qadir Hakimuddin, whose mausoleum is in Burhanpur, Madhya Pradesh.
  - The entrance facing south is called Bab-e Zaini, so named after the 45th Da'i al-Mutlaq, Syedna Tayyab Zainuddin, his great-grandfather, whose tomb is in Surat.
  - The entrance facing north is called Bab-e Fakhri, so named after his ancestor, Syedi Fakhruddin Shaheed, whose mausoleum is in Galiyakot, Rajasthan.

== Interior features ==
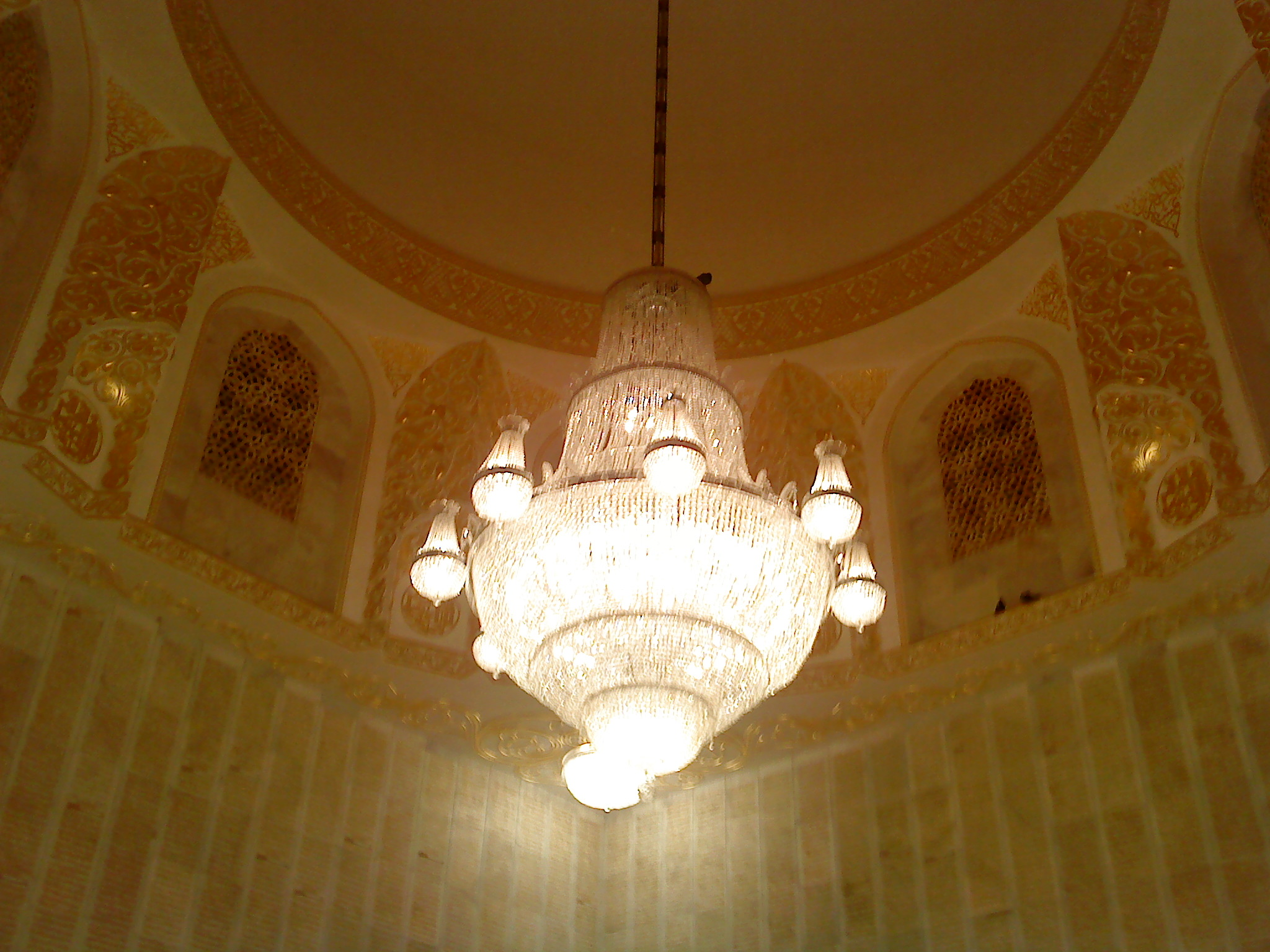
The mausoleum's four walls contain the complete text of the Qur'an

- The inner height of the mausoleum is 80 feet (24 m) above the plinth, the age of Syedna Taher Saifuddin at the time of his death. Similarly there are 80 corniches all around the mausoleum.
- The inner dimensions of the tomb are 51 x 51 feet (16 m), symbolizing that he was the 51st Da'i al-Mutlaq.
- In the center of the tomb is the grave of Syedna Taher Saifuddin, whose measurement is 28 square feet (2.6 m^{2}); this number was chosen to coincide with the age at which he became the Dāʿī al-Mutlaq.
- Adjacent towards the right hand side of Syedna Taher Saifuddin's grave is Syedna Mohammed Burhanuddin's grave of equal measurement.
- The entire Quran is inscribed within the four walls of its sanctum sanctorum in pure gold. A 772 page golden handwritten Quran from which Syedna Taher Saifuddin used to recite daily, was transcribed onto 772 marble slabs of 3x2 feet each which form the inner walls of the Raudat.
- The Quran begins from the right hand side of the western wall, continues on the southern wall, followed upon the eastern wall, and ends on left hand side of the northern wall.
- On top, the structural shell consists of a dome 40 feet (12 m) in diameter with a height of 52 feet (16 m). The dome is a replica of Al Jamea Al Juyushi, Cairo.
- The rosette at the apex of the dome has the same mudawwar (circular) design in the interior as that of the masjid Al Juyushi, with the Quranic proclamation "إِنَّ ٱللَّهَ يُمْسِكُ ٱلسَّمَٰوَٰتِ وَٱلْأَرْضَ أَن تَزُولَا ۚ وَلَئِن زَالَتَآ إِنْ أَمْسَكَهُمَا مِنْ أَحَدٍۢ مِّنۢ بَعْدِهِ", (Surah 35 Ayah 41) meaning "Allah holds the sky and earth together which none else can" along its periphery. The names of Mohammed and his successor Ali are embellished in Kufic script in the center.
- Though it was not intended originally, but as the laying of the Quranic tablets within the walls continued, it became apparent that all the entrance doors to the tomb got adorned with a Bismillah.
- All the 113 Bismillah in the Quran inscribed on the walls are studded with precious gem stones, such as rubies, diamonds, emeralds, corals etc. The Surat Al Fatiha and Surat Al Ikhlas are studded with rubies.
- Surah Ya Sin, is the only surah to be encircled in a double lined box and can be found on the left side of the eastern wall.
- Below the Quran, on the walls are the stanzas and verses quoted from the 49 Risalah sharifah, hundreds of Qasidas and munajaats written by Syedna Taher Saifuddin which reflect the Barakah of the Quran and the Ilm of Ale Mohammed. They demonstrate his interpretation of the scriptures, and which inspire the visitor, to a higher plane of thinking and nobler way of life, towards which Islam ultimately beckons.
- Below the above verses, on the eve of the 100th Birthday Celebrations of Syedna Mohammed Burhanuddin in 2011 (1432 Hijri), the 52 Stanza marasiyah of Fulkul Husaine be Karbala "فلك الحسين بكربلاء", was added as an inlay on the walls.
- Between the columns on which Quran is written and the above-mentioned writings, is an embossed marble engraving, which alternates after every two columns. The design of the engraving is the exact copy of the design used on the shield of Zulfiqar by the Fatimid on their monuments in Cairo.
- A glittering crystal chandelier, suspended from the center of the dome, sheds its brilliance upon the tomb and seems to cast a divine light upon the hallowed precincts, while the four circular corner fittings and twenty four wall brackets lend their light to the radiance within the Mausoleum. The chandeliers are especially made on order and each pendetive is engraved with the Quranic verse "لا يمسه الا المطهرون" (Surah 56 Ayah 79) meaning "none but the pure shall hold the Holy Quran".
