= Murder of Dana Bennett =

2003 murder of an American-Israeli woman

- Born: Dana Ben-Yitzhak Bennett; 12 September 1985; Chicago, Illinois, United States
- Died: 1 August 2003 (aged 17); Between Migdal and Hamaam, Israel
- Cause of death: Strangulation
- Burial: May 21, 2009, in Tiberias, Israel
- Arrested: Yahya Farhan
- Convicted of murder: Yahya Farhan (July 21, 2010)
- Sentence: Three consecutive life sentences without the possibility of parole

Dana Bennett (Hebrew: דנה בנט) was a 17-year-old American-Israeli who disappeared on August 1, 2003, on her way home from work, near her aunt and uncle's house. A large-scale operation to locate Bennett was conducted to no avail. Her remains were finally discovered in 2009 after a confession from the girlfriend of the perpetrator, serial killer Yahya Farhan. He was convicted of murder in 2010.

== Biography ==
Dana Ben-Yitzhak Bennett was born on September 12, 1985, in Chicago, Illinois, to Victoria Bennett and Benjamin Ben-Yitzhak, an Israeli citizen living in San Francisco. Bennett grew up in the Jewish area of Fairfax, Los Angeles, and studied at the Etz Yaakov religious school. As a child, her parents divorced, and in 1999, she made aliyah to Israel alone. In Israel, she was educated at a boarding school in the religious kibbutz of Tirat Zvi, before moving to Tiberias. Bennett held dual American citizenship and maintained contact with her relatives and friends in Los Angeles.

In Tiberias, she worked at her aunt and uncle's restaurant. On July 30, 2003, she went to work as a waitress in the Lebanese fish restaurant "Cedar of Lebanon", owned by a former SLA member, under the Cesar Hotel on the shore of Lake Kinneret.

Three months before her disappearance, Bennett underwent surgery to treat blood vessels in her head. In the months since, she needed medicine and regular treatment.

== Disappearance ==
On Friday, August 1, 2003, around 2:30 PM, when her second day of work at the restaurant ended, Bennett and her co-worker, Shiran Koria, boarded a shared taxi. According to the company's testimony, she got off the taxi at about 1:00 AM, at a bus stop near the city's football stadium. She crossed the road and began walking towards the house, where her aunt and uncle lived on Bar-Kocha Street in Upper Tiberias, where she was supposed to meet her cousins Ortal and Lalon. Since then, nobody saw her. At 1:45 that night, a signal was received from her cellphone near a cell tower. After she did not reach her aunt's house until the morning hours, the police were called.

== Investigation ==
A special investigation team was set up for the case, headed by Chief Superintendent Avi Hilweh, investigations officer of the Amakim District of the Israeli Police, to question dozens of witnesses regarding the incident. Some were detained at the police station, although later released by the Judiciary of Israel in Nazareth. The team also examined dozens of testimonials from people who saw of heard Bennett from the date of absence, but to no avail. The investigation also examined the possibility of criminal or nationalistic motives. Because of her American citizenship, the FBI aided in searching for the missing girl.

Among the testimonies examined was that of a taxi driver who said that two days after her disappearance, he drove a girl who resembled Bennett from Rehovot to the entrance to Kiryat Gat. The police located the girl, but it was not Bennett. Other reports placed her in the Ashdod area. After ten days of intense searching, the number of volunteers fell considerably, and most of the police's efforts moved to the intelligence level.

In addition, another testimony revealed about two men in a parked car who were seen signaling to a girl matching Bennett's description. It was determined that the two men, who were married, were seeking sexual adventures, but the police denied their involvement in Bennett's disappearance.

At the same time, the Israel Police conducted extensive searches for Bennett, in cooperation with thousands of volunteers and policemen, with the assistance of helicopters, cavalry, jeeps and ATVs, which initially focused on the environs of Migdal and Maghar. The Arab regional radio station "Radio a-Shams", which had opened shortly before, also helped recruit Arab volunteers for searches. About a week later, her father and brother came to Israel to participate in the searches, and they involved the FBI in the investigation. The searches later moved to the area of Lavi, in the Lower Galilee and after a weeks, to Kfar Hittim, located close to Lake Kinneret and the Mount Carmel area. More than a month after her disappearance, and after they reached the conclusion that the investigation had hit a dead end, her parents, Victoria and Benjamin, together with Yachdav-Am and Rabbi Shlomo Harush, the principal of her childhood school in the United States, decided to offer a $50,000 prize to anyone who knew where she is. The amount was later doubled to $100,000. However, the police did not have an active suspect in the case, and nobody claimed the family's prize. Later, Amnon Levy claimed that the head of Am Ehad, Miriam Moskowitz, had defrauded the Bennett family, telling them that their daughter was held in Jenin and taking large sums of money from them.

More than four months after her disappearance, the police launched another large-scale search operation to locate Bennett in the area of the Poriya Junction and Giv'at Avni in the Lower Galilee. Another such operation was conducted in January 2004, and the establishment of a new brainstorming by the Valley Commander Yaakov Zigdon, who made yet another search the following month in Tiberias and Migdal. More extensive searches were conducted four years after her disappearance.

In December 2004, a special investigative team was established and shared information with the police, the army and other organizations, led by Deputy Commander of the Northern District of the Israel Police, Brigadier General Yehuda Solomon and attended by Gen. Arie Tessler from Northern Command. The purpose of the special team was the investigation of several disappearances, including Dana Bennett's, the disappearance of the soldier Guy Hever, the mysterious disappearance of Ira Gurevich (Gurevich's body was later found in a minefield near an abandoned car), the disappearance of a Czech tourist near Tzalmon River (the tourist's disappearance was later solved and connected to Bennett's disappearance, see below) and the murder of a couple from Rosh Pinna, with the assistance of the Shin Bet in the Abu Kabir Forensic Institute. The team opened a website to provide information about Bennett's fate from civilians, and maintained the working assumption that she had been kidnapped.

In January 2005, a report was sent to Agence France-Presse, which was signed by a terrorist organization called "Free Galilee", in which it claimed that the organization's members were holding Bennett. The organization demanded that the Israeli government release 1,000 Palestinian prisoners in return for giving information about her fate, and the Israeli prime minister apologize to "our people for all the crimes committed by the occupying army". However, the organization refrained from publishing information proving its responsibility for the abduction and thus raised doubts as to the legitimacy of the announcement. The very existence of the organization is questioned. Similar messages linked to the organization, supposedly composed of Israeli Arabs, were given during Guy Hever's disappearance.

In 2008, efforts were renewed and searches were carried out for Bennett's body in the Migdal area, but to no avail. The investigation of the case was entrusted to Superintendent Shlomi Mu'alem in 2008, the intelligence coordinator of the Tiberias police.

== Discovery of remains ==
In 2009, close to Independence Day, information reached the police that was more important than anything else collected to that date. Based on that information, the investigators arrived at the house of a 22-year-old woman named Y. (because she was a minor at the time of the murder, her identity was concealed). Y. confessed that she was the girlfriend of the murderer, Yahya Adwan Farhan, a 32-year-old resident of Hamaam. She revealed details of the murder and Farhan's modus operandi, as well as other murders committed by him.

Based on the information provided by Y., the police succeeded in finding Bennett's remains. The body was buried and the gravesite disguised as an archaeological excavation, in order to conceal the corpse. On May 18, 2009, six years after her disappearance, the police central valley units announced that they had found Bennett's remains near Tiberias. The body parts were sent to the Forensic Institute at Abu Kabir, where her identity was confirmed. Three days later, Bennett was brought for burial near Tiberias.

On May 26, police announced that the suspect in the murder was Yahya Farhan. In the indictment, it is alleged that Farhan and Y. noticed Bennett exit the shared taxi while travelling in his car. They persuaded her to board the car under false pretences, and then Farhan drove to the fields between Migdal and Hamaam, where he beat, choked Bennett to death with her own bra, and then burned her body. Y. witnessed the murder, and then helped in burning the body.

The police also charged Farhan with two other murders: in June 2003, he murdered Silvia Molarova, a Czech tourist who was drowned in the Tzalmon River; in this murder, he was also assisted by his girlfriend. The other murder occurred in July 2004: at the time, Farhan was detained by the Tiberias police. After a fight with another prisoner named Aharon Simchov, Farhan followed him to the shower, where he strangled him to death. Until then, the police thought that Simchov had committed suicide. Farhan was also charged in the kidnapping and rape of a prostitute in September 2005, but the victim escaped after the attack.

On March 15, 2010, Y. was convicted in a plea bargain and sentenced to 14 years imprisonment. On January 4, 2012, the Supreme Court rejected her appeal on the severity of the sentence. On July 21, 2010, Farhan was convicted and sentenced to three cumulative life sentences and another 12 years. The judges ruled that the act was "murder for no reason", and that Bennett was not raped before her death. In the appeal, Farhan was acquitted of Simchov's death, but his conviction in the other offenses was confirmed.
