= Ma'an Shurbaji =

Syrian political activist from Daraya, a suburb of Damascus, active in Daraya Youth during the Civil uprising phase of the Syrian Civil War. Brother of noted activist Yahya Shurbaji and was arrested with him on September 7, 2011, in Daraya.

In July 2018, the Syrian government named Ma'an and Yahya Shurbaji as among the 161 detainees who died in Syrian prisons since 2011, dying within 11 months of each other in 2013.
