= Aiwan-e-Nawadrat-e-Quaid-i-Azam =

Coordinates: 24°52′31″N 67°02′27″E

- Established: 1985
- Location: Mazar-e-Quaid, Karachi, Pakistan
- Type: History museum

Aiwan-e-Nawadrat-e-Quaid-i-Azam (ANQA), also known as Aiwan-e-Nawadrat Museum, is situated within the boundaries of Mazar-e-Quaid in Karachi, Pakistan. This museum holds a remarkable collection of historical items and showcases objects connected to the nation's founder, Muhammad Ali Jinnah.

== History ==
In 1985, Shireen Bai, also known as Shireen Jinnah and the sister of the Quaid, donated to Aiwan-e-Nawadrat, a set of cherished heirlooms that held a deep connection to the life of the nation's founder. This assortment was subsequently handed over to the caretakers of Mazar-e-Quaid, serving as a powerful representation of an ongoing dedication to safeguarding the country's heritage.

== Collection ==
The museum showcases a diverse array of items, such as manuscripts of the Quran, Picard and Cadillac automobiles, inkpots and pens, elegant clothing worn by royalty, and grand furnishings.

== Future Developments ==
In 2021 President Dr. Arif Alvi has emphasized the importance of making information about valuable historical artifacts available through digital means, alongside ensuring proper illumination of display cases at ANQA. This effort aims to engage researchers and individuals passionate about history.

== See also ==
- List of things named after Muhammad Ali Jinnah
