= Yahyaabad, Sirjan =

Yahyaabad يحيي اباد
- Village
- Location within Iran
- Coordinates: 29°27′38″N 55°38′21″E
- Country: Iran
- Province: Kerman
- County: Sirjan
- Bakhsh: Central
- Rural District: Sharifabad

Population (2006)
  - Total: 234
- Time zone: UTC+3:30 (IRST)
  - Summer (DST): UTC+4:30 (IRDT)

Yahyaabad (Persian: يحيي اباد, also Romanized as Yaḩyáābād) is a village in Sharifabad Rural District, in the Central District of Sirjan County, Kerman Province, Iran. At the 2006 census, its population was 234, in 55 families.
