= Yahya Abdullah Mohammed Hamad =

Communications and Information Technology

Personal details
- Born: February 27, 1968 (age 58)
- Education: Ain Shams University, Egypt. University of Limerick, Ireland. Sudan University of Science and Technology, Sudan.
- Occupation: Politician; Academic

Yahya Abdullah Mohammed Hamad is a Sudanese academic and a former Minister of Communication and Information Technology.

== Early life and education ==
Yahya Abdullah Mohammed Hamad was born on February 27, 1968. He obtained his elementary school certificate from Khartoum Modern School between 1973 and 1980. He attended Alengelia Preparatory School between 1980 and 1983. He obtained his secondary school certificate from Abdelnasir Gamal Secondary School in 1986. He bagged his first degree in 1991 from Ain Shams University, Egypt, where he studied Computer Science and Automatic Control (Honours). In 1996, he obtained his MSc in Computer Systems at the University of Limerick and he bagged his PhD in Computer Science in 2002 at the Sudan University of Science and Technology.
