= Yahya ibn Yahya al-Tamimi =

Muslim scholar (died 841)

Yahya ibn Yahya al-Tamimi يحيى بن يحيى التميمي

Personal life
- Born: after c. 759 Nishapur, Abbasid Caliphate (present-day Iran)
- Died: May c. 841
- Era: Islamic Golden Age (Abbasid era)
- Region: Abbasid Caliphate
- Main interest: Hadith
- Occupation: Islamic scholar, Muhaddith

Religious life
- Religion: Islam
- Denomination: Sunni
- Jurisprudence: Hadith

Muslim leader
- Influenced by: Malik ibn Anas, Al-Layth ibn Sa'd
- Influenced: Muhammad al-Bukhari, Muslim ibn al-Hajjaj

Abu Zakariyya Yahya ibn Yahya ibn Baker ibn Abdulrahman ibn Yahya ibn Hammad al-Laythi (Arabic: يحيى بن يحيى التميمي) (born: 759 / died: 841) was a prominent Islamic Sunni Muhaddith.

He was born in Nishapur in present-day northeastern Iran. He travelled to Hijaz, Iraq, Egypt and Sham to collect Hadith, and was one of the prominent students of Malik ibn Anas and Al-Layth ibn Sa'd. Among his prominent students were Muhammad al-Bukhari and Muslim ibn al-Hajjaj.
