= Yahyaabad, Torbat-e Heydarieh =

Yahyaabad يحيي اباد
- Village
- Location within Iran
- Coordinates: 35°18′20″N 59°12′49″E
- Country: Iran
- Province: Razavi Khorasan
- County: Torbat-e Heydarieh
- Bakhsh: Central
- Rural District: Bala Velayat

Population (2006)
  - Total: 388
- Time zone: UTC+3:30 (IRST)
  - Summer (DST): UTC+4:30 (IRDT)

Yahyaabad (Persian: يحيي اباد, also Romanized as Yaḩyáābād; also known as Aḩyā’ābād) is a village in Bala Velayat Rural District, in the Central District of Torbat-e Heydarieh County, Razavi Khorasan Province, Iran. At the 2006 census, its population was 388, in 110 families.
