= Yahya Shurbaji =

Yahya Shurbaji (Arabic: يحيى شربجي Yaḥyā Šurbaǧī; born 21 December 1979) is a Syrian political activist and part of the Daraya Youth, a group of activists known for non-violence convictions and change through civic actions. It is reported that he was killed in Sednaya Prison under detention and torture.

== Life ==
Shurbaji was born in Darayya, a suburb of Damascus. He studied at the Faculty of Science of Damascus University, but did not finish his degree. His brother Ma'an Shurbaji is also involved in political and social activism.

== Activism ==
He participated in a number of civil action between 1998 and 2003 when he was arrested for 2 years. Later he took part in demonstrations against the US-led invasion of Iraq. He also participated in many demonstrations during the Syrian Revolution, while insisting on non-violence of the action on the ground which included not insulting or provoking regime soldiers and security forces, giving flowers to army soldiers who were sent to crush the protests, and giving water bottles to soldiers.

== Arrest and disappearance ==
He was arrested with his brother Ma'an Shurbaji and friend Ghiath Matar by the Air Force Security Branch in Daraya on September 6, 2011. His cousin Mazen Shurbaji had been taken into custody three days earlier. The body of Matar was sent back to his parents with clear signs of torture and mutilation four days later. Nabil Shurbaji, a close relative of the Shurbaji brothers, who had gone into hiding at the start of mass arrests by government forces in September 2011, was captured by intelligence officers near Darayya on February 26, 2012. Both Ma'an and Yahya Shurbaji's fate and whereabouts remained unclear for several years. The UN called for the immediate release of Shurbaji and all other political detainees in Syria.

In July 2018, the Syrian government named Ma'an and Yahya Shurbaji as among the 161 detainees who died in Syrian prisons since 2011, dying within 11 months of each other in 2013.
