= Mazar-e-Quaid =

Mausoleum of Muhammad Ali Jinnah in Karachi, Pakistan

- مزارِ قائد
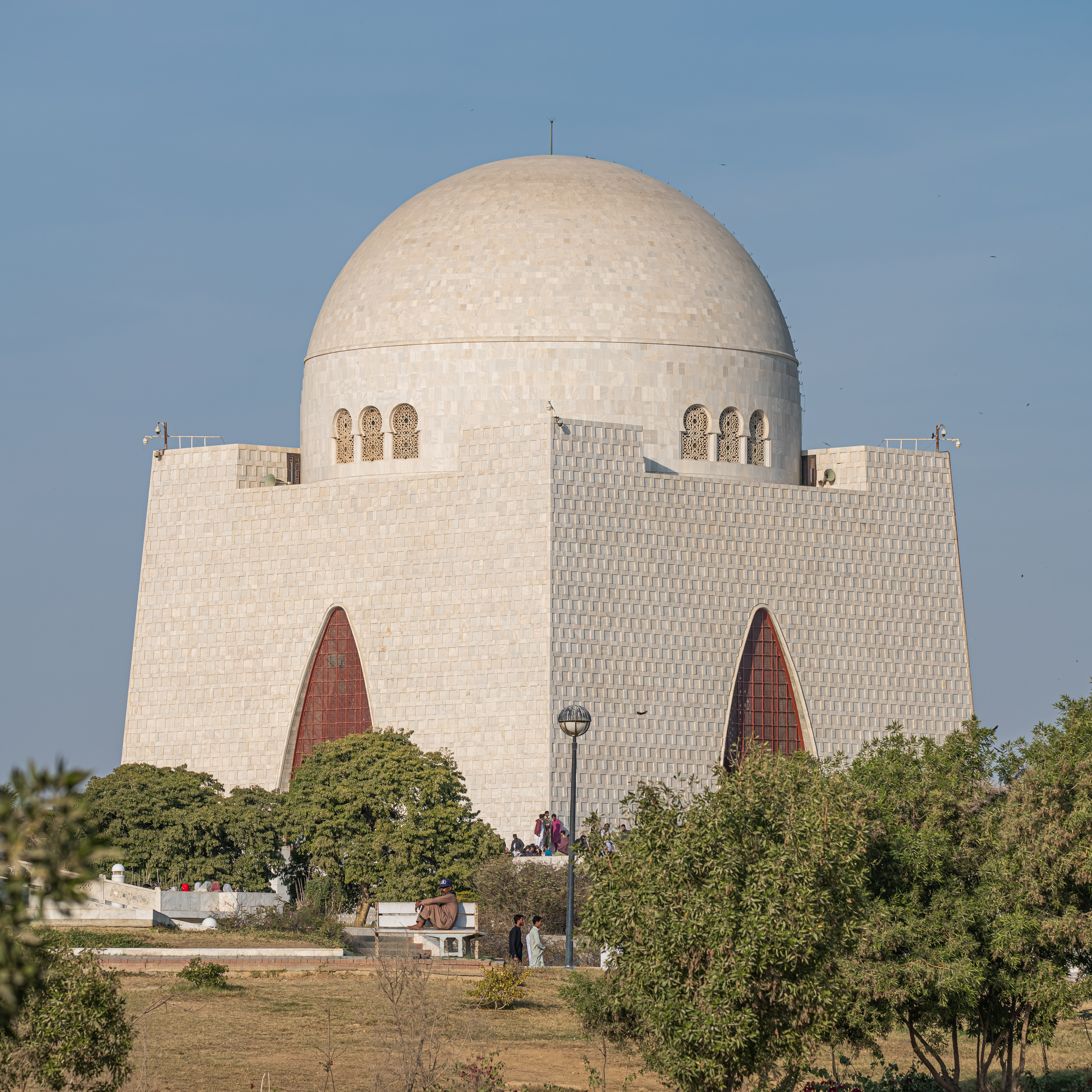
- View of the mausoleum from the Muhammad Ali Jinnah Road
- Interactive map of Mazar-e-Quaid
- Location: Jamshed Quarters, Karachi, Sindh, Pakistan
- Coordinates: 24°52′31″N 67°02′27″E
- Designer: Yahya Merchant
- Type: Mausoleum
- Material: White marble, copper lattice work
- Length: 75 m (246 ft)
- Width: 75 m (246 ft)
- Height: 43 m (141 ft)
- Beginning date: 31 July 1960
- Completion date: 18 January 1971
- Dedicated date: Muhammad Ali Jinnah

Mazar-e-Quaid (Urdu: مزارِ قائد, lit. 'Tomb of the Leader'), also known as Jinnah Mausoleum or the National Mausoleum, is the final resting place of Muhammad Ali Jinnah, the founder of Pakistan. Designed in a traditional style with a minor influence of modernist style, it was completed in 1971, and is an iconic symbol of Karachi alongside being one of the most popular tourist sites in the city. The mausoleum complex also contains the tomb of Jinnah's sister, Māder-e Millat ("Mother of the Nation") Fatima Jinnah; as well as those of Liaquat Ali Khan and Nurul Amin, the first and eighth prime ministers respectively. The tomb of Sardar Abdur Rab Nishtar, a stalwart of the Muslim League from Peshawar, is also located there.

== Location ==
The mausoleum is located in a prominent and highly visible location in the Jamshed Quarters locality of central Karachi, along the northern edge of the colonial-era core at the end of Muhammad Ali Jinnah Road. The mausoleum is surrounded by a large garden laid out in a neo-Mughal style in the dense city, with large traffic rotaries at three of its four corners.

== History ==
Muhammad Ali Jinnah's death occurred in 1948, and his final resting place was marked by a large white marble slab that was raised on a plinth accessed by marble steps. In 1949, the Quaid-e-Azam Memorial Fund (QMF) was established, which received numerous suggestions for the establishment of a memorial to Jinnah. By 1952, his mausoleum was capped by a small dome, with a cabinet that contained some of his personal effects along a wall near his grave. The site, however, fell into neglect which angered many Pakistanis. Fatima Jinnah and the QMF received numerous letters from concerned Pakistanis at the sad state of his tomb, and advocated for a more befitting monument to Jinnah.

In 1952, the QMF proposed to erect 4 monuments across Pakistan to Jinnah's memory: a mausoleum and mosque on the current site in central Karachi, a Dar-ul-Uloom religions school in Punjab and a University of Science and Technology in East Pakistan. In 1954, an Indian architect was selected to design the mausoleum, but was later dismissed. In 1955, a Turkish architect was hired, but his plan was rejected as well.

In 1957, the Government of Pakistan held an international competition to design a new mausoleum for Jinnah. The competition was initially won by British architect William Whitfield, of the Raglan Squire and Partners firm. The state's efforts to select a design were paralleled by the efforts of the Jinnah's sister, Fatima Jinnah, who sought input from the public in the design of a monument to her brother. Fatima Jinnah effectively vetoed the 1957 proposal, and assumed control of the QMF. She then commissioned architect Yahya Merchant, a Bombay based architect who was a personal friend of Jinnah, to design the monument.

President Ayub Khan laid the foundation stone for the monument on 31 July 1960. It was inaugurated by Yahya Khan on 18 January 1971. The gardens surrounding the mausoleum were not completed until 24 December 2000.

== Proposed designs ==
Numerous proposals were submitted by Pakistani citizens following independence: ranging from a shrine, to a neo-Mughal monument. The idealists suggestions directly from ordinary Pakistani citizens reflected the "radical utopianism" that swept through the Muslims of the subcontinent around the Pakistan Movement.

In 1954, an Indian architect was selected to design the mausoleum, but his design could not gain consensus among members of the QMF, and so was dismissed. In 1955, a Turkish architect was hired, but his plan was rejected as being "too elaborate," and "almost despotic." The QMF's mandate stalled as consensus over the design was lacking. Proposals from the Malay engineer and architect Ainuddin, suggested a complex reminiscent of a Sufi shrine, with mosques, libraries, school, restaurants, and shops to merge into the fabric of the city.

Proposed design by William Whitfield

1957, the Government of Pakistan held an international competition to design a new mausoleum for Jinnah. 6 of the 8 jurists were European modernist architects. The 1957 competition was won by William Whitfield of the modernist Reglan Squire and Partners firm. The plan called for an avant-garde neo-futurist mausoleum mounted on an elevated platform in a neo-Mughal garden, with a central parabola and pointed edges at its six corners reaching out "in an exuberant motion towards the sky." Following the 1958 coup of President Ayub Khan, who presented himself as a modernizer, the Whitfield-Squire proposal gained favor among the military elite, although public reception was not warm. Fatima Jinnah opposed Whitfield's plan on several fronts, including its design, its selection by an international rather than Pakistani jury, and that it was awarded to a British national, which challenged the desire of Pakistanis for a de-colonial future.

Fatima Jinnah then assumed control of the design process, and chose the proposals of architect Yahya Merchant, a Bombay based architect who was a personal friend of Jinnah. Merchant's design was of a cuboid structure with a dome, clad in white marble. The monument was placed on an elevated platform, set in a 24.6 ha (61-acre) gardened hill looking over the city. The new design was praised by eminent professor Ahmad Hasan Dani as "not a slavish imitation of the old tradition. Actually it partakes of the Muslim spirit of the past but it is created to meet the new demand of the present in the technique of the present day."

== Architecture ==
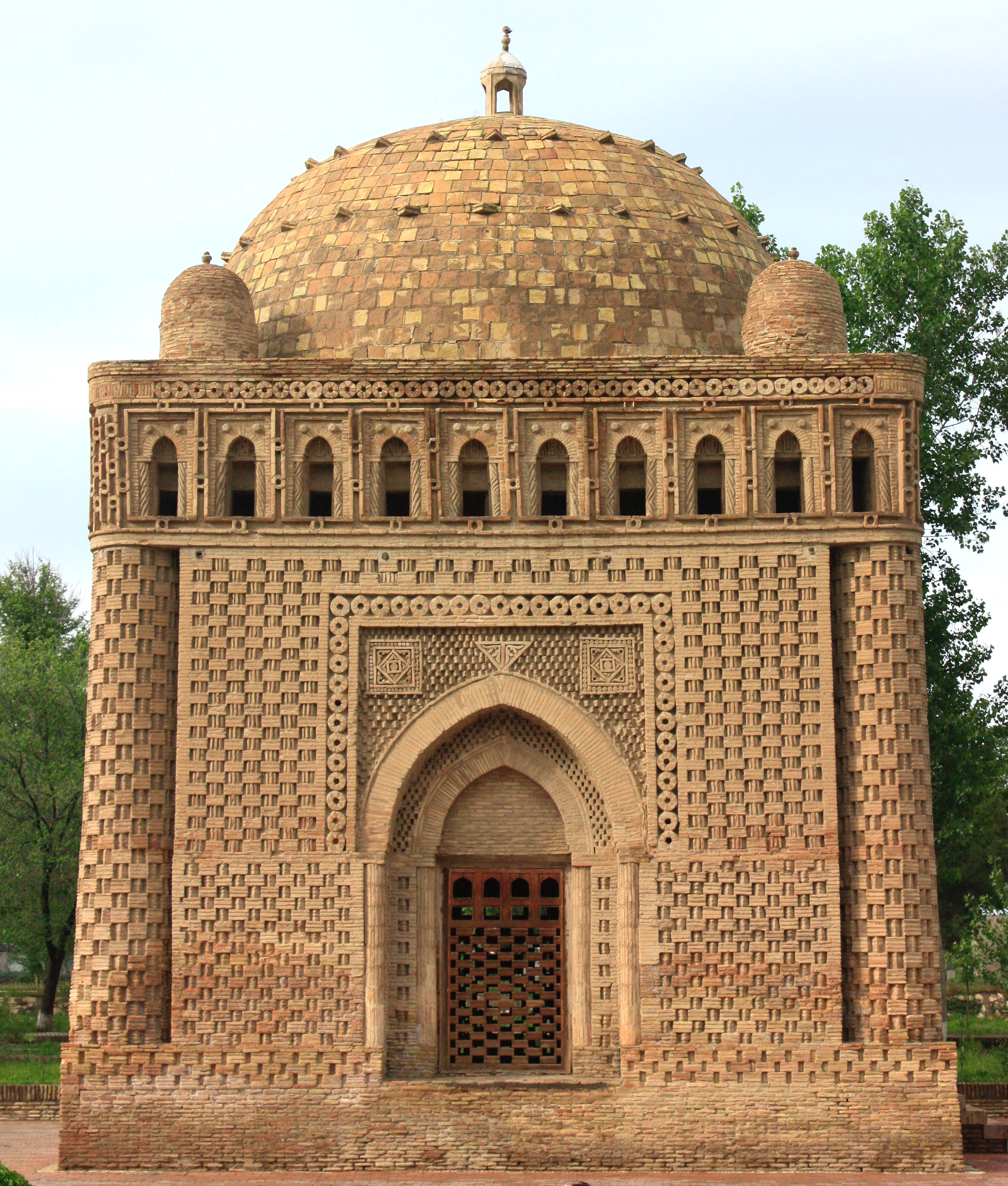
The design of the Mazar-e-Quaid was influenced by the Samanid Mausoleum in Bukhara, Uzbekistan, built between 892 and 943 CE.

The mausoleum was designed in a traditional style with a minor influence of modernist style popular during the 1960s and 1970s, and has been termed a "traditional monument of a modernist period." It appears simple at a distance, but "exuberant in its use of material and complex in its detailing when viewed" closely. The use of white marble to suggest purity, and pure geometric forms, are designed to portray Jinnah as a larger-than-life figure. The location and style of the monument both serve to inspire passersby.

It is clad in white marble, and has curved arches and copper grills set on an elevated 54-square-metre platform. The cool inner sanctum reflects the green of a four-tiered crystal chandelier given by the People's Republic of China.

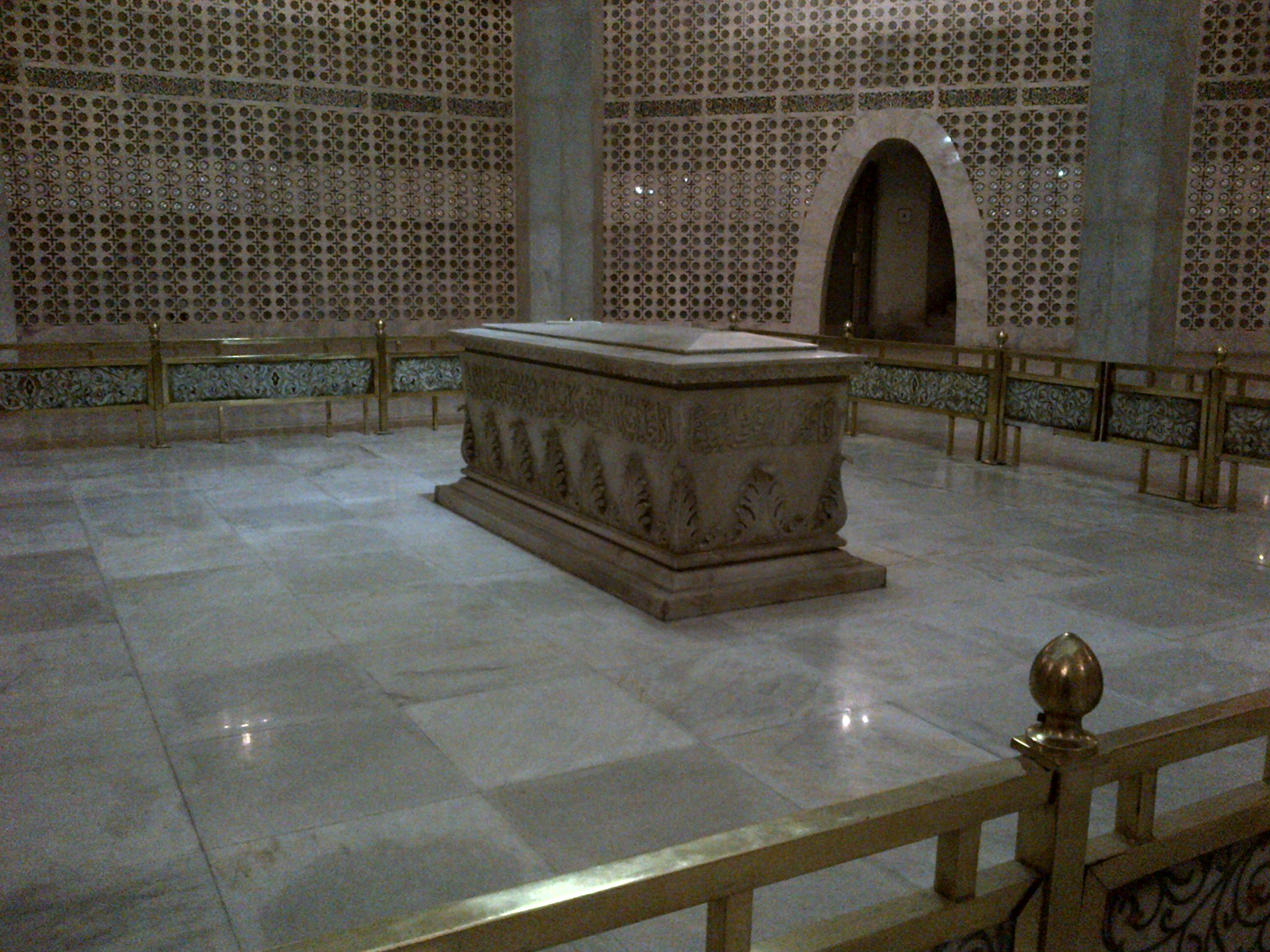
A view of the sarcophagus

In the interior of the grave complex, there are four graves in a row and one to the north. The one to the north, which is decorated with a series of black floral design at the base, belongs to Miss Fatima Jinnah, Quaid-e-Azam's sister. Out of the four graves in a row, first extreme two belong to Liaquat Ali Khan, the first Prime Minister of Pakistan and Begum Ra'ana Liaquat Ali Khan lying side by side. The other extreme grave belongs to Sardar Abdur Rab Nishtar. In the middle lies buried Nurul Amin, who was the eighth Prime Minister of Pakistan. All these graves are made of Italian white marble, and they are of the box type, like the sarcophagus of Jinnah, placed on a triple base. But the sides of these graves are tapering inward while that of Jinnah are diverging outward. These are all plain graves, except that of Mohtarma Fatima Jinnah, which has a basal floral ornamentation.

The mausoleum is located in a 53-hectare park and the building has a footprint of 75 by 75 m (246 by 246 ft) with a height of 43 m (141 ft), built on a 4 m (13 ft) high platform. In each wall is placed an entrance. Fifteen successive fountains lead to the platform from one side and from all sides terraced avenues lead to the gates. Around the mausoleum is a park fitted with strong beamed spot-lights which at night project light on the white mausoleum.

== Significance ==
Official and military ceremonies take place here on special occasions, such as on 23 March (Pakistan Day), 14 August (Independence Day), 11 September (the anniversary of Jinnah's death) and 25 December (Jinnah's birthday). Dignitaries and officials from foreign countries also visit the mausoleum during official tours. On 14 August 2017, Pakistan's Independence Day, it was used for paying a tribute to Jinnah through 3d projection mapping show by 3D illumination.

== Gallery ==
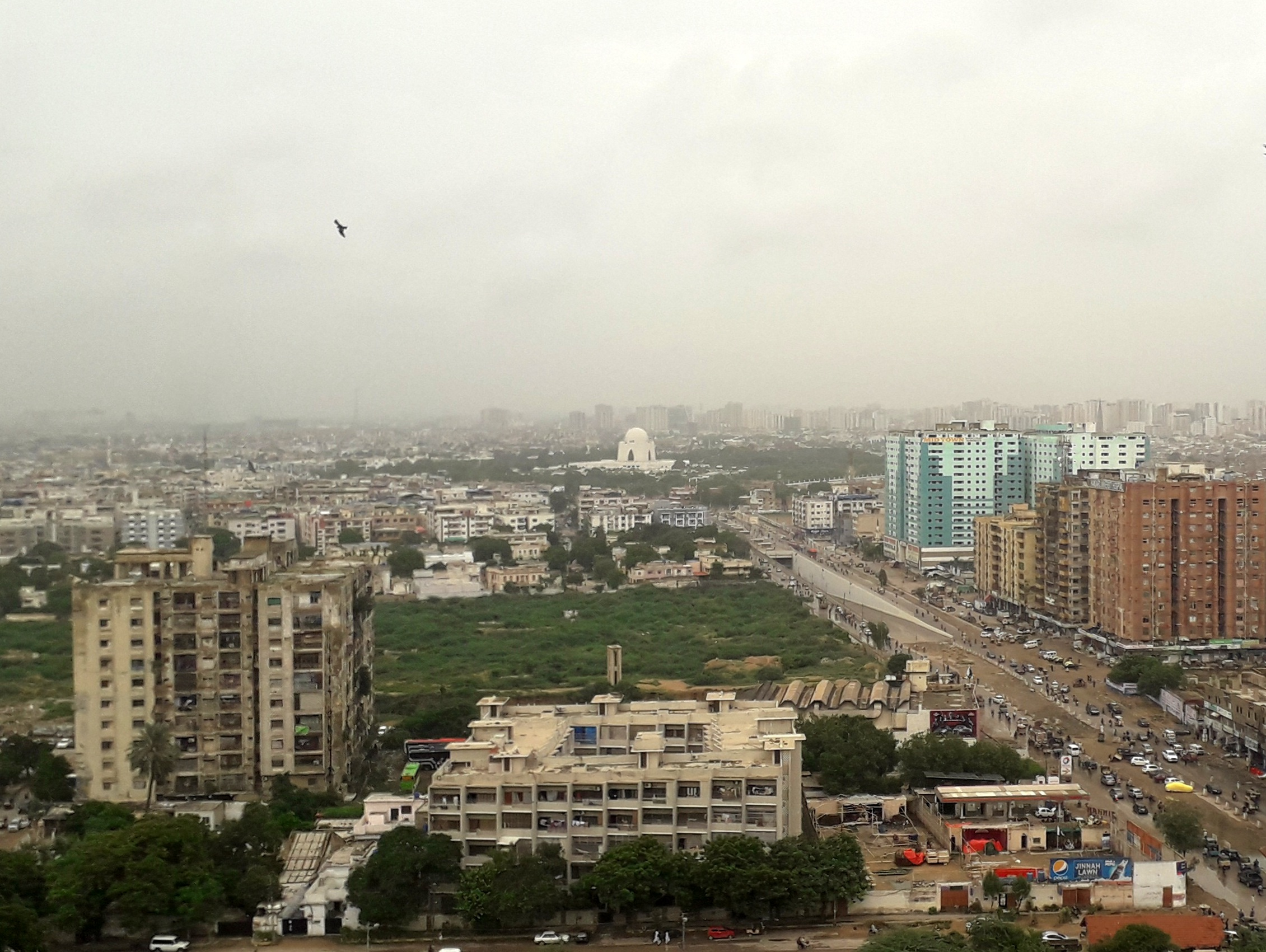
Mazar as seen from a distance

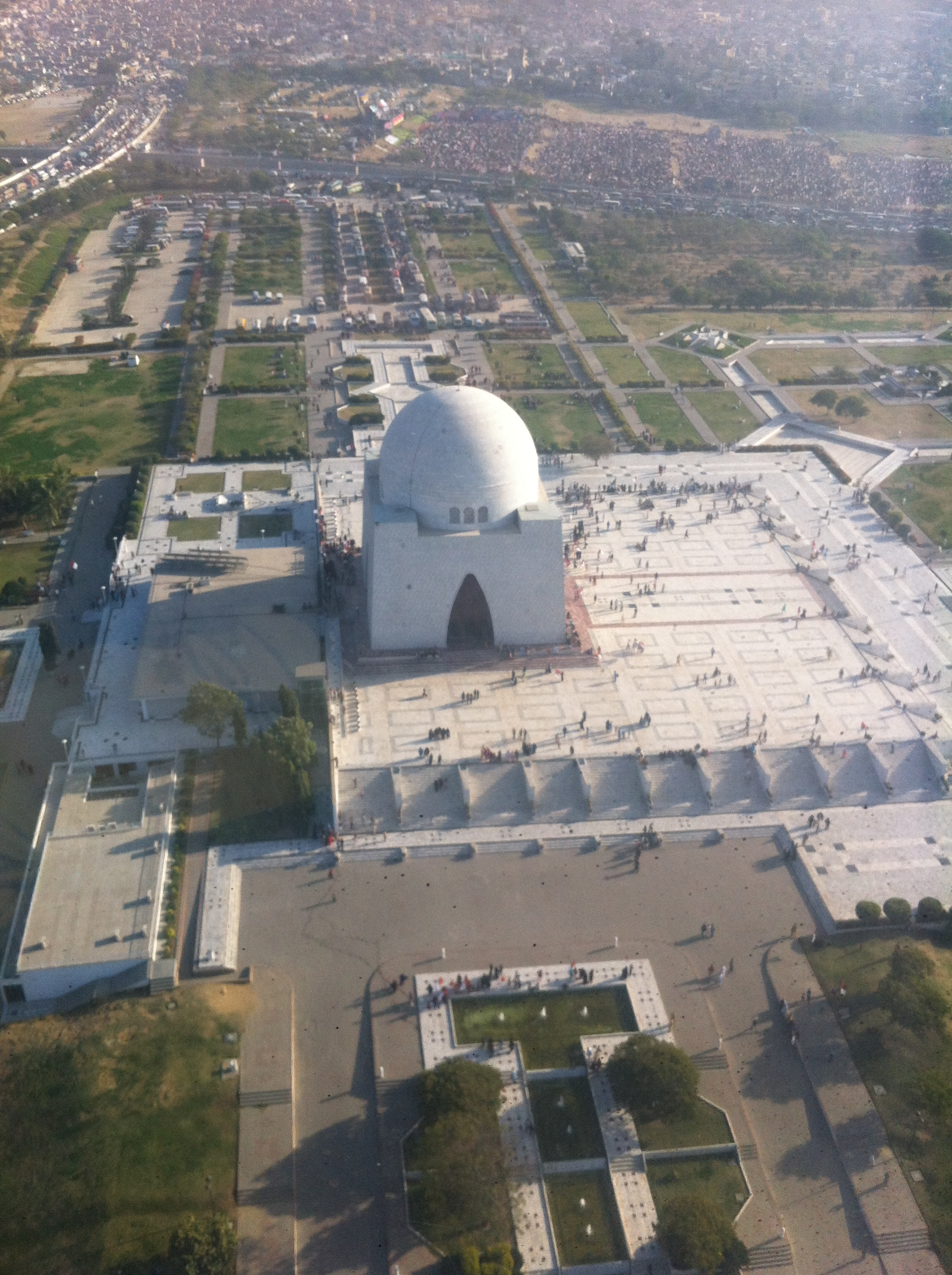
Aerial view of the building

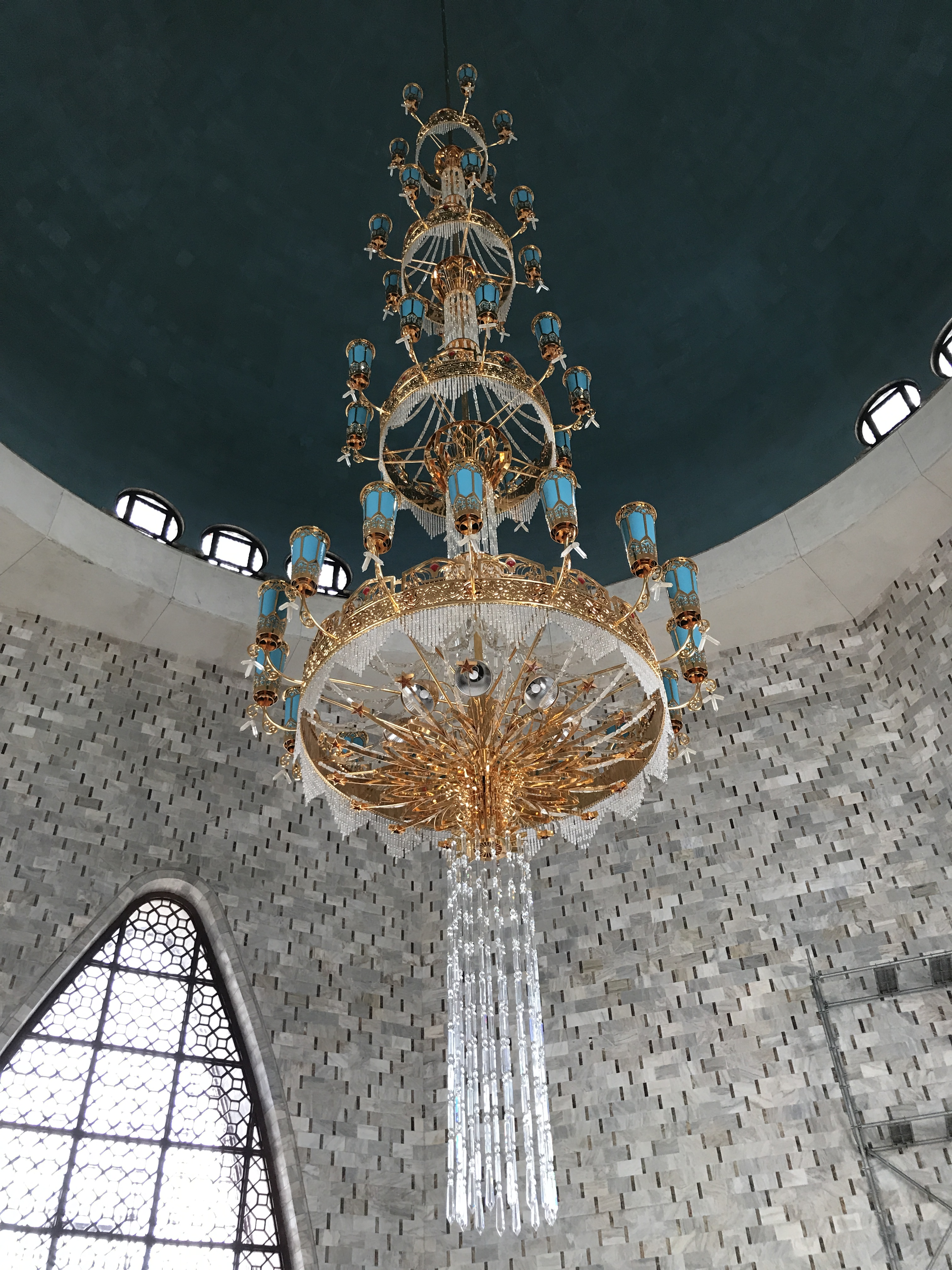
View of the chandelier donated by an Islamic association in China

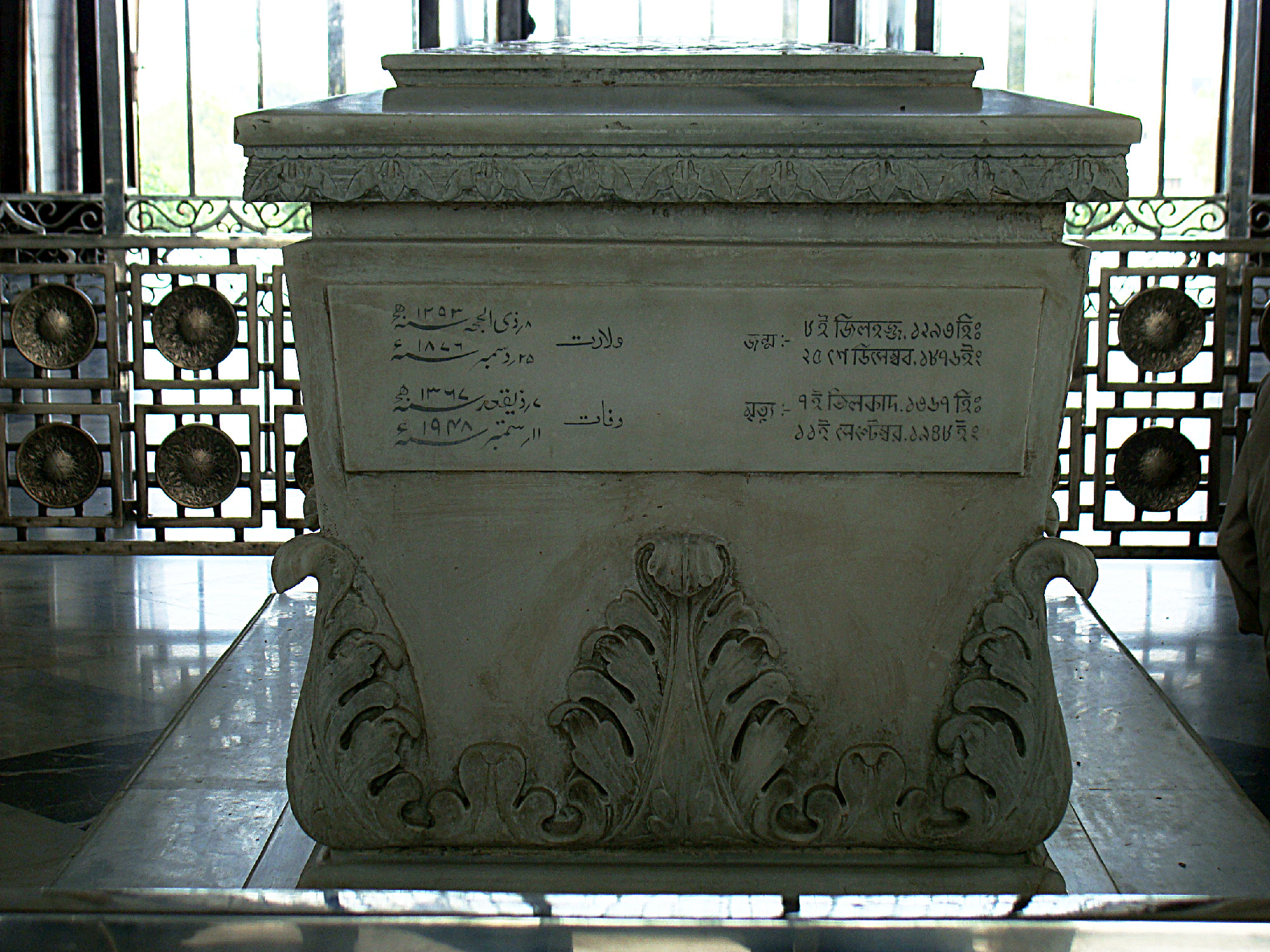
Inscriptions on the tombstone, in Urdu and Bengali

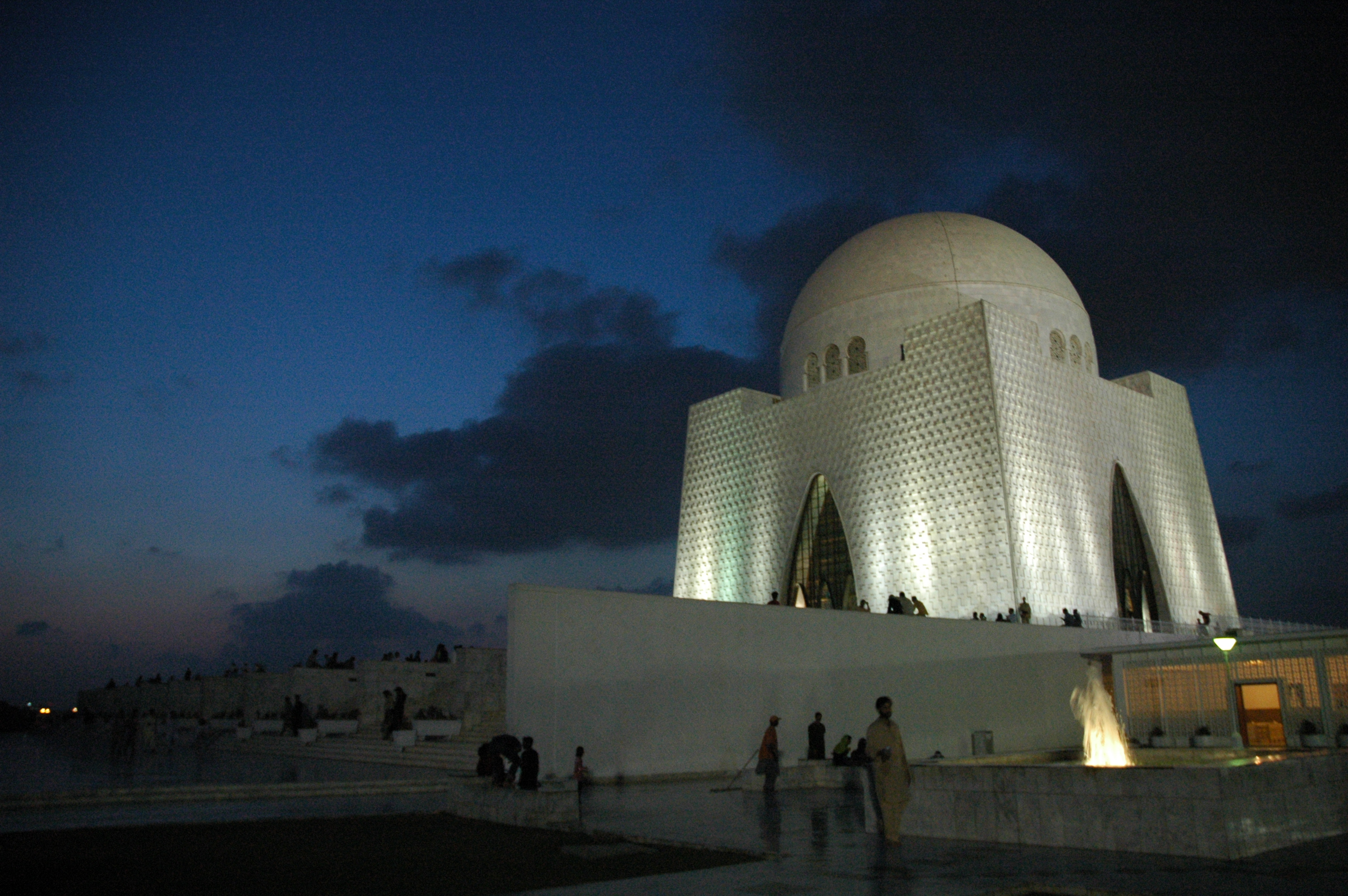
Evening view

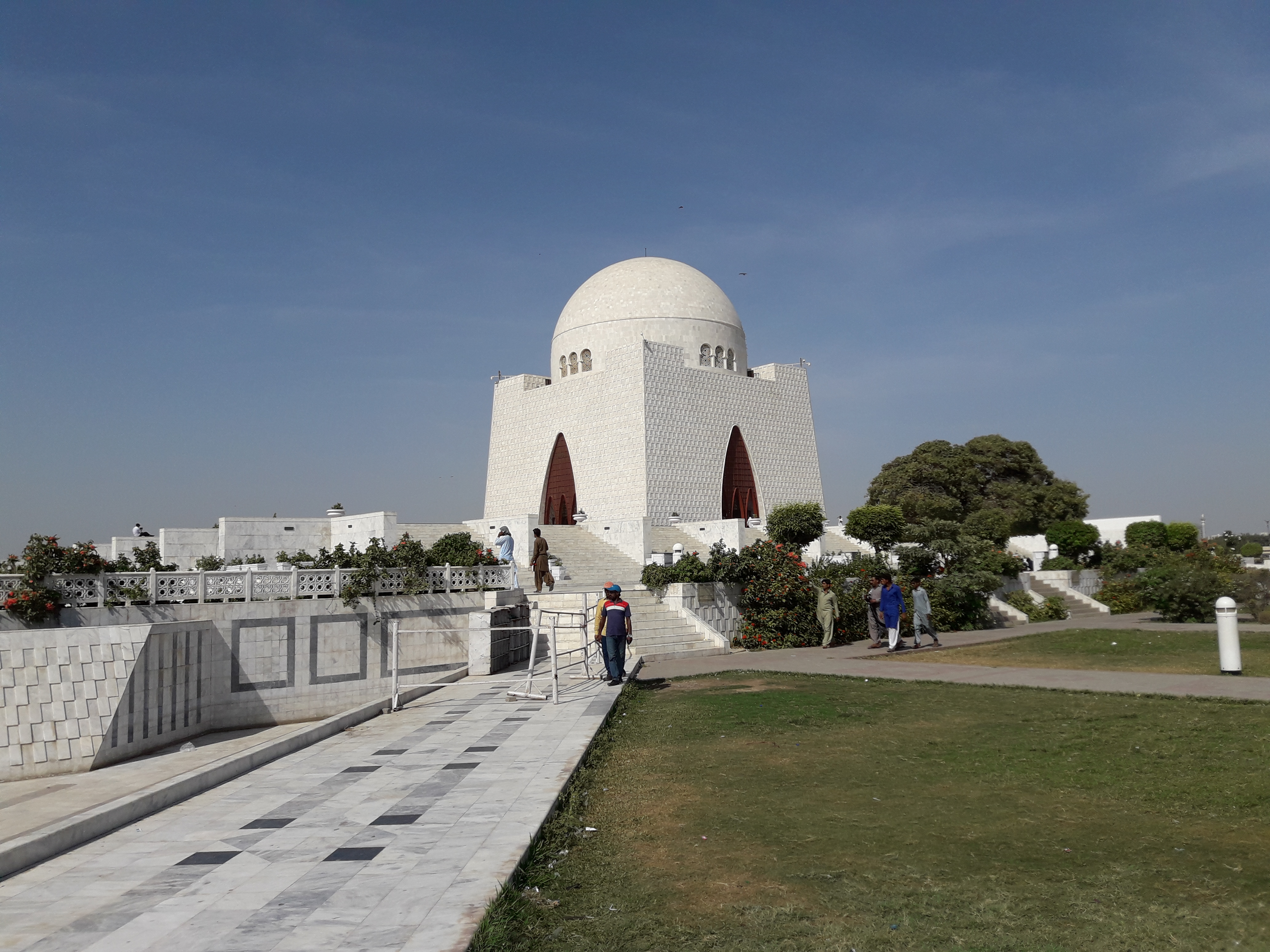
View from the gardens which surround the mausoleum

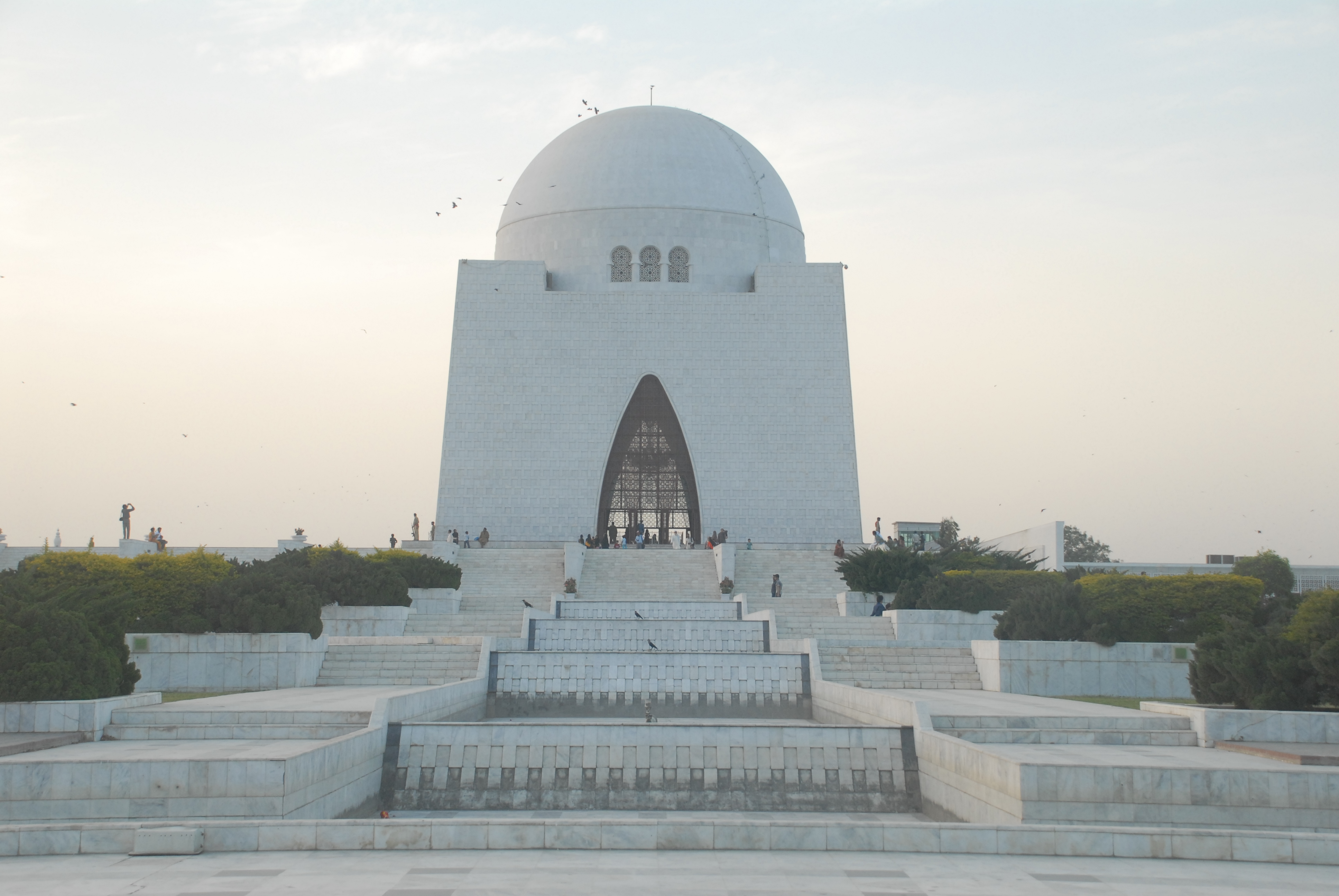
A view of the mausoleum

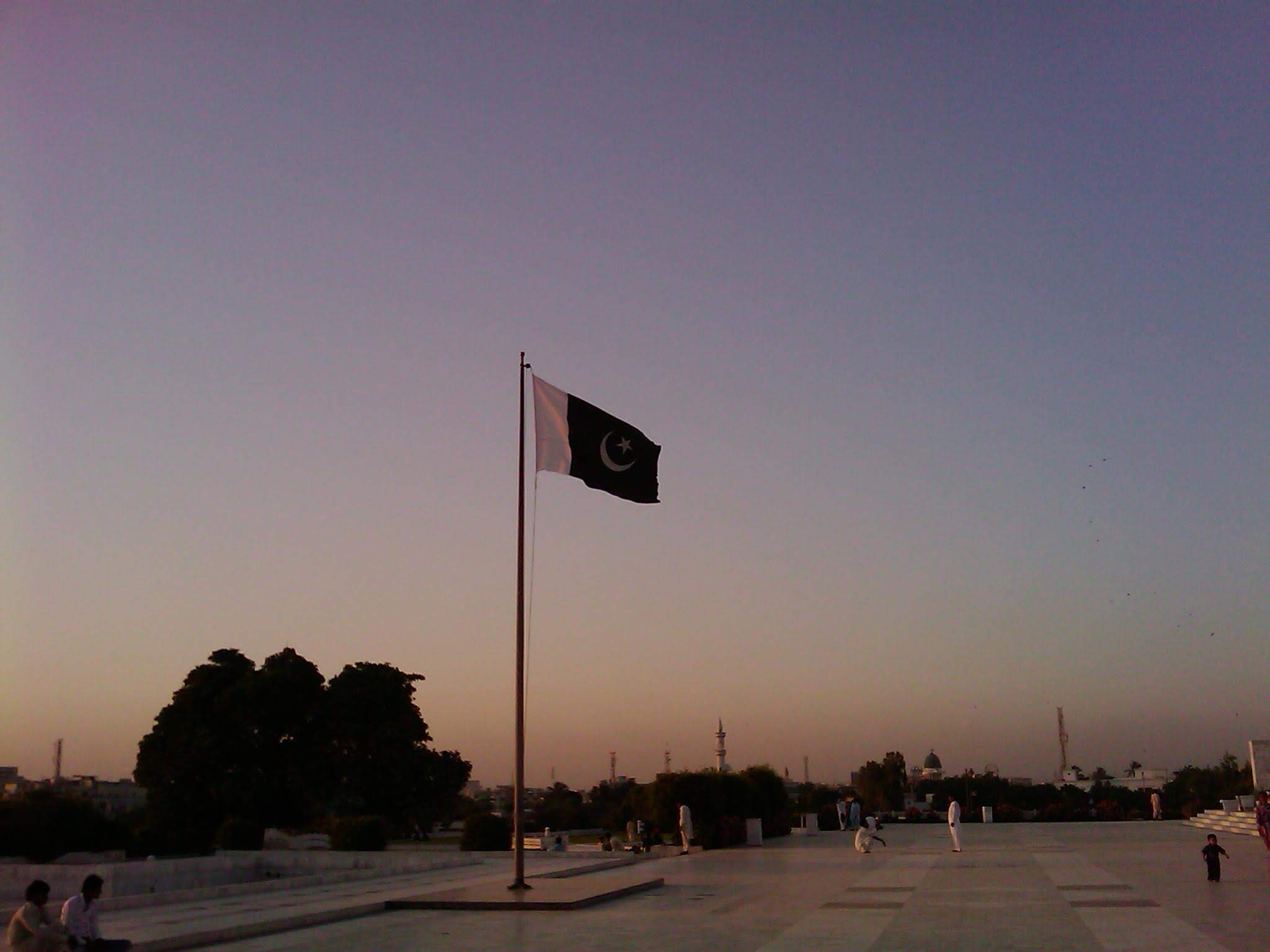
Pakistan flag near to Mazar-e-Quaid

== See also ==
- Aiwan-e-Nawadrat-e-Quaid-i-Azam
- Wazir Mansion, Jinnah's birthplace in Karachi
- Jinnah House, Jinnah's house in Mumbai, India
- Governor-General's House, Jinnah's official residence in Karachi
- Quaid-e-Azam Residency, Jinnah's residence in Balochistan where he spent the last days of his life
- Quaid-e-Azam House, Muhammad Ali Jinnah's House in Karachi
