= Yahyaabad, Joveyn =

Yahyaabad يحيي اباد
- Village
- Location within Iran
- Coordinates: 36°31′12″N 57°31′43″E
- Country: Iran
- Province: Razavi Khorasan
- County: Jowayin
- Bakhsh: Central
- Rural District: Pirakuh

Population (2006)
  - Total: 35
- Time zone: UTC+3:30 (IRST)
  - Summer (DST): UTC+4:30 (IRDT)

Yahyaabad (Persian: يحيي اباد, also Romanized as Yaḩyáābād) is a village in Pirakuh Rural District, in the Central District of Jowayin County, Razavi Khorasan Province, Iran. At the 2006 census, its population was 35, in 13 families.
