= Yahyaabad, Fariman =

Yahyaabad يحيي اباد
- Village
- Location within Iran
- Coordinates: 35°44′32″N 59°37′39″E
- Country: Iran
- Province: Razavi Khorasan
- County: Fariman
- Bakhsh: Central
- Rural District: Fariman

Population (2006)
  - Total: 27
- Time zone: UTC+3:30 (IRST)
  - Summer (DST): UTC+4:30 (IRDT)

Yahyaabad (Persian: يحيي اباد, also Romanized as Yaḩyáābād) is a village in Fariman Rural District, in the Central District of Fariman County, Razavi Khorasan Province, Iran. At the 2006 census, its population was 27, in 8 families.
