= Yahya Farhan =

Israeli criminal and serial killer

- يحيى فرحان
- Born: Adwan Farhan; 1976 (age 49–50); Hamaam, Israel
- Convictions: Murder (2 counts); Rape
- Penalty: Life imprisonment

Details
- Victims: 2–4
- Span of crimes: 1994–2004
- Country: Israel
- State: Northern District
- Date apprehended: 2009

Yahya Adwan Farhan (Arabic: يحيى فرحان; born Adwan Farhan in 1976) is an Arab-Israeli criminal and suspected serial killer responsible for numerous offences, the most notable being the murder of Dana Bennett. Farhan confessed to numerous robberies, rapes and four murders (later recanting them), and was convicted of three murders and one rape, receiving three consecutive life sentences. After an appeal, he was acquitted of his last murder, but his other convictions were upheld.

== Early and adult life ==
Adwan Farhan was born to a Muslim Arab family, in the little Bedouin village of Hamaam, Israel. He is the youngest of 13 children. His father, Yahya, was part of the Palmach and fought alongside the Jews during the War of Independence, but died when his son was only 5 years old. His mother had difficulty raising Farhan, who soon became the family's black sheep. Years later, his mother also died. In 2007, much to family's dismay, he changed his name to Yahya, in order to honor his father.

As an adult, Yahya Farhan would become a career criminal responsible for a variety of crimes but still managed to marry a woman named Zeriya, with whom he had four children, one of which, a daughter, suffered from kidney disease. He spent little time with them due to spending time in various prisons. When he was a 26-year-old man, he raped a 13-year-old girl from Tiberias (only identified as Y.). Farhan mistreated the girl and her family, beating the teenager on two different occasions and forcing her to convert to Islam. The teenager also gave birth to a baby, but since it was uncertain who the father was, the child was sent to a foster family.

== Crimes ==
Farhan first entered the criminal world at the age of 16, but was arrested and imprisoned for the first time in 1998, at the age of 22. Since then, he has had numerous convictions, serving time in the Shita, Ashmoret, Tzalmon and Eshel prisons. According to police from the Northern District, at some point he was an informant, but contact with him was ceased after his information turned out to be unreliable.

=== Non-murder offences ===
- January 1999: rape and other sexual offences. Sentenced to four years in prison, and released in September 2002.
- 2004 (unknown date): attempted to poison one of his sisters.
- Early 2004: weapon possession. Sentenced to one year and eight months in prison, plus 20 months suspended sentence. Released in 2006.
- September 2005: Farhan raped a prostitute, Vans Farhan, in Tiberias. He went up to her apartment, undressed and, threatening her with a knife, raped her several times. When he finished, he dragged Vans to his car where his girlfriend was waiting, but the victim managed to escape his grasp.
- 2006: two weeks after release, Farhan was arrested yet again, for a number of crimes. They include burglary, auto theft, forgery, fraudulence, defamation under aggravated circumstances, check kiting and two robberies. In the first robbery, he stole fuel from a gas station and stabbed the station owner, threatening to burn his car if he spoke about it. In the second one, he robbed a resident of Tiberias while threatening him with a screwdriver.
- Unknown date: raped a female tourist from Australia. Little information is available, as a gag order was placed over the case.

=== First murder ===
According to his confessions, Farhan committed his first murder in 1994, at age 18, killing a friend near the Arik Bridge in the Golan Heights. This couldn't be verified, and he was not prosecuted for this murder.

=== Murder of Silvia Molarova ===
A 27-year-old tourist and volunteer from the Czech Republic, Silvia Molarova was spending most of her time at a pub near Dugit. Farhan spotted the drunk woman trying to hitch a ride from the pub in March 2003, and taking advantage of her state, he and his girlfriend drove the unsuspecting Molarova to the Tzalnom River. He held her by the hair and strangled Molarova to death with a thin cable. After that, he put her head in the stream, and when her body stopped moving entirely, he forced his girlfriend to tie stones to the body, in order for it to not float.

=== Murder of Dana Bennett ===
On May 26, 2003, Farhan and his girlfriend noticed Dana Bennett exiting a shared taxi while travelling in his car. The pair persuaded Bennett to enter their car, and after she entered, Farhan began driving towards a field in Migdal. When they arrived, he hit the scared Bennett in the face, tore off her blouse, took off her bra and strangled her with it. The girlfriend, Y., watched the whole event and later helped with burning the body and hiding the remains.

=== Murder of Aharon Simchov ===
In July 2004, while in a detention center in Tiberias, a fight broke out between the prisoners. After having breakfast the next day, Farhan followed Aharon Simchov, one of the prisoners involved in the fight who cooperated with authorities, to the shower area. With all noises camouflaged by the running water, Farhan proceeded to beat Simchov, before strangling him with a string taken from the victim's trousers. He then hung the body from the shower head, in an attempt to simulate suicide.

== Trial and sentence ==
After Bennett's body was discovered in 2009, Y. was questioned about the case, confessing that Farhan had killed the girl. During this time, he was imprisoned in Beersheba for robberies and theft and was awaiting trial for one of the rape cases. When interrogated, Farhan confessed to his crimes and the other murders, implicating Y. in helping him with two of them. His guilt was definitely proven, as he managed to recreate the Bennett crime scene accurately.

At trial, he quickly recanted his confessions, accusing the authorities of denying him access to his lawyers, medication and any sleep at all. He also alleged that the real killer was roaming free and that Roman Zadorov, who was suspected of killing a woman, was also innocent of his respective crime. Despite his claims, Yahya Farhan was sentenced to three consecutive life sentences, plus 12 years for the rape of Vans Farhan.

On October 2, 2013, an appeal from Farhan was approved, acquitting him of Simchov's death, as there was insufficient evidence to prove his guilt. However, the judges reaffirmed the rest of the convictions and sent Farhan off to the Sha'ar Menashe psychiatric hospital.

== See also ==
- Arab citizens of Israel
- List of serial killers by country
