= Yahya Merchant =

Indian architect (1903–1990)

- Born: 1903; India
- Died: 1990 (aged 86–87)
- Occupation: Architect
- Buildings: Tomb of Quaid-e-Azam
- Design: Mazar-e-Quaid, Pakistan; Raudat Tahera, India

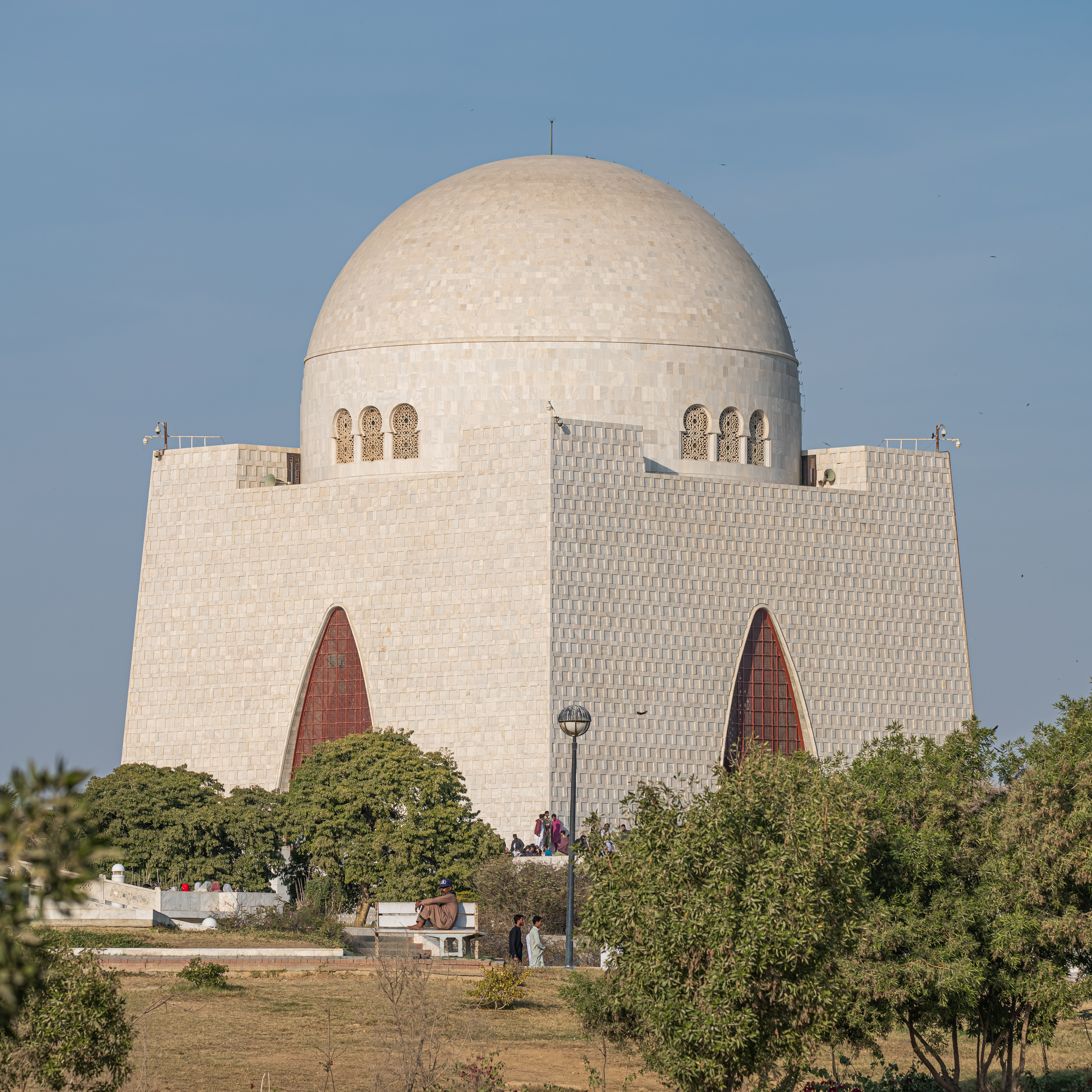
Quaid-e-Azam Mausoleum

Yahya Merchant (1903–1990) was an Indian Dawoodi Bohra architect. Among his designs are the Quaid-e-Azam Mausoleum for Muhammad Ali Jinnah in Karachi, Anna Nagar Tower in Anna Nagar Tower Park Chennai, and the Raudat Tahera Mausoleum for Syedna Taher Saifuddin in Mumbai.
