= Apostasy in Zoroastrianism =

Apostasy in Zoroastrianism is when a Zoroastrian leaves Zoroastrianism, which leads to punishment, the most common of which was execution. The punishment for apostasy was applied to Zoroastrians who converted to Christianity and were accused of practicing heresy.

== Texts ==
In the Zoroastrian holy book, the Avesta, in the Vendidad section at the beginning of chapter 15, the text mentions the greatest sins a Zoroastrian might commit, the first of which is spreading a doctrine other than the Zoroastrian faith to other Zoroastrians. The punishment for this act is two hundred beheadings.

In the book Tansir a book specializing in punishments during the Sasanian era, there is a distinction made between those who leave Zoroastrianism and those who introduce heresies into it. The former states that previously, those who left Zoroastrianism were killed immediately. However, because the king desired a lighter punishment, the first step was imprisonment, and Zoroastrian religious scholars were summoned to persuade the apostate to return to Zoroastrianism. If he refused and remained defiant, he was killed. As for those who introduce heresies into Zoroastrianism in the name of religious interpretation, the punishment was torture to death by having an elephant trample them. In the book Rivāyatī Ēmēdī Ašawahištān, attributed to Omid-e-Ashwishtan, a Zoroastrian priest, there is a statement that a Zoroastrian who converts to Islam will be given a year to return to Zoroastrianism, otherwise, he will be killed and his property confiscatedه And in the book Pahlavi stated that an apostate deserves death

In the Zoroastrian book of Arda Viraf, chapter 36, it is mentioned that Ardavirav saw a snake with a human-shaped head. He inquired about it, and an angel told him that this was the punishment for apostasy. But in Shāyest nē Shāyest In section 17, it states that the apostate will not be resurrected on the Day of Resurrection

in the book Menog-i Khrad chapter 36, abandoning religion is considered one of the most heinous sins. In Denkard, chapters 215, 216, 231, and 246, apostates and apostasy are condemned.

== Persecution of Christians ==
The Christians of the Sasanian state were subjected to several periods of persecution, mainly targeting Zoroastrians who had converted to Christianity or who were trying to spread it. Executions were carried out through torture, even to the point of cutting off all limbs and preventing the burial of the body. According to the encyclopedia, this was a punishment specifically for those who apostatized from Zoroastrianism.

Yazdegerd II tried to force the Christian Armenians to return to Zoroastrianism in Battle of Avarayr.The Armenian historian Moses Khorenatsi stated that the Sassanids enslaved the Armenians they captured and forced them to return to Zoroastrianism.

== Apostasy in contemporary Zoroastrianism ==
In contemporary Zoroastrianism, its stance on apostasy has not changed much, as evidenced by the Zoroastrian scholar Dr. Ardeshir Khorshidian's treatise on Zoroastrian rulings, including the confiscation of the property of a Zoroastrian who embraces Baha'i faith.

Furthermore, in the book "Settlement and Conflict" by the Zoroastrian scholar Jamshed Garshasp Choksi, and in another book, he describes the one who abandons Zoroastrianism as having his soul deprived of paradise.

A prominent Parsi priest has stated that a Parsi woman who marries a non-Parsi is considered to have left Zoroastrianism because a wife follows her husband even if she remains a Zoroastrian and does not adopt her husband's religion. Many Parsi clergy oppose marriage outside the faith.

When Mariam Jinnah embraced Islam, the reaction of the Parsis was negativeThe Parsi community was outraged at not only Ruttie, but also her parents. After the marriage of Ratanji Dadabhoy Tata to the Frenchwoman Suzanne Brière, (who later converted to Zoroastrianism), many conservative Parsis were concerned of the rapid anglicization, indifference to religion, and materialistic lifestyle of the Parsi elite. Furthermore, most Parsi youth of Ruttie's age from wealthy families at the time were either indifferent to religion or full-blown atheists, and their parents did precious little to educate them religiously. After the marriage of Jinnah and Ruttie, it was the final straw and the conservative Parsis and mobeds called for all of their youth to be religiously re-educated. Regarding the Petit family, they were given two choices by the Parsi Panchayat. They could either be excommunicated along with their daughter, or remain within the community provided they publicly disinherit their daughter and sever all contact with her. Her family chose the latter.
