= Jamsetji Tata =

Indian industrialist (1839–1904)

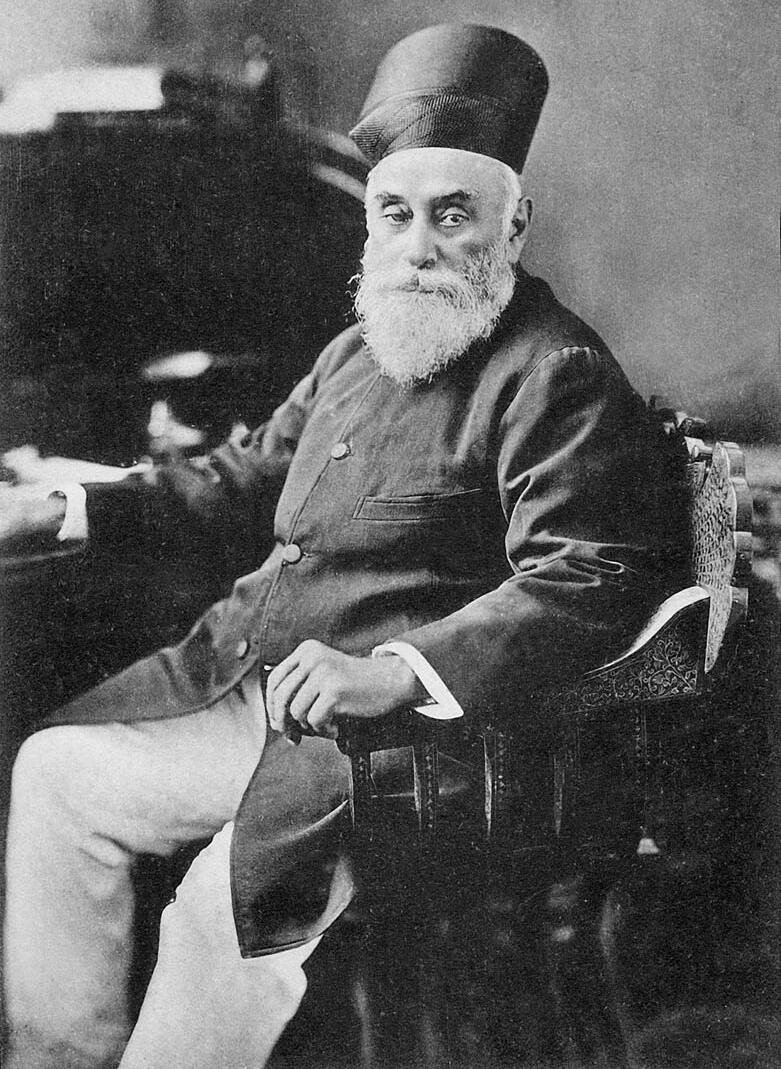
- Tata on a 1910 postcard

1st Chairman of Tata Sons and Tata Group
- In office 3 March 1868 – 19 May 1904
- Preceded by: Office established
- Succeeded by: Dorabji Tata

Personal details
- Born: Jamsetji Nusserwanji Tata; 3 March 1839 Navsari, Bombay Presidency, British India
- Died: 19 May 1904 (aged 65) Bad Nauheim, Grand Duchy of Hesse, German Empire
- Resting place: Brookwood Cemetery, England
- Spouse: Hirabai Daboo
- Children: 2 (Dorabji and Ratanji)
- Relatives: Tata family
- Education: Elphinstone College
- Occupation: Industrialist; philanthropist

Jamsetji Nusserwanji Tata (3 March 1839 – 19 May 1904) was an Indian industrialist, philanthropist and patriarch of the Tata family who founded the Tata Group, India's largest conglomerate. He established the city of Jamshedpur.

Born into a Parsi family of priests in Navsari. It was his father Nusserwanji that broke tradition to become the first businessman in his menage. Jamsetji was 20 when he joined his father's already-established small trading and banking business in 1859. He graduated from Elphinstone College in Mumbai as a "Green Scholar."

After working in his father's export-trading firm and recognizing opportunities in the cotton industry during a business trip to China, Tata, at 29, founded a trading company in 1868. He later ventured into the textile industry and established Empress Mill, Nagpur, afterwards purchasing a bankrupt oil mill in Mumbai and converting it into a cotton mill. Tata's innovative strategies and commitment to industrial development in India led him to establish key institutions and companies, including the Taj Mahal Hotel in Mumbai, which was India's first hotel with electricity, and made significant contributions towards the establishment of the Indian Institute of Science, Tata Steel, and Tata Power. He was so influential in the world of industry that Jawaharlal Nehru referred to Tata as a One-Man Planning Commission.

Tata was a philanthropist, particularly in the fields of education and healthcare. His donations and foundations laid the groundwork for modern Indian industry and philanthropy. Tata's legacy includes the city of Jamshedpur, named in his honour, and a lasting influence on India's industrial and social landscape. He married Hirabai Daboo, and their sons, Dorabji Tata and Ratanji Tata, continued his legacy within the Tata Group. Tata's contributions were recognized posthumously, including being ranked first in the "Hurun Philanthropists of the Century" (2021) by total donations of $102.4 billion (in 2021 prices) with the start of his key endowments back in 1892.

== Early life ==
Jamsetji Nusserwanji Tata was born on 3 March 1839 in Navsari, Bombay Presidency, Company Raj to Jeevanbai Nusserwanji Tata (née Kawasji Tata) and Nusserwanji Ratanji Tata. He was born in a respectable, but poor family of Zoroastrian priests (Mobeds). His mother tongue was Gujarati. He broke his family's priestly tradition to become the first member of the family to start a business. He started an export trading firm in Bombay.

Tata had a formal Western education because his parents saw that he was gifted in mental arithmetic from a young age. However, for him to have a more modern education, he was later sent to Bombay. He joined his father, Nusserwanji, in Bombay at the age of 14 and enrolled at Elphinstone College, completing his education as a "Green Scholar" (the equivalent of a graduate). He was married to Hirabai Daboo while still a student.

After graduating from the Elphinstone College in 1858, he joined his father's export-trading firm, and helped establish its strong branches in Japan, China, Europe, and the United States. Nusserwanji Tata wanted his son to be a part of this business, so he sent him to China to learn running a business there and the details about the opium trade. However, when Tata travelled around China, he began to realize that the cotton industry was booming and there was an opportunity of making a great profit.

== Business ==
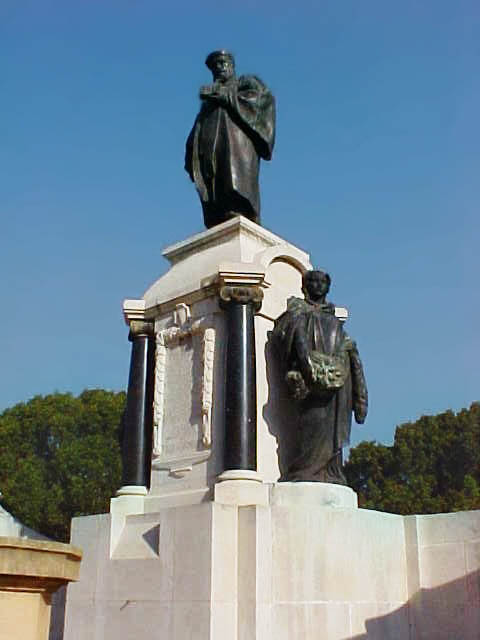
Statue of J. N. Tata (top) at the Indian Institute of Science, Bangalore faculty hall with a miniature model of the faculty hall in his hand

Tata worked in his father's company until he was 29. He founded a trading company in 1868 with ₹21,000 capital (worth US$52 million in 2015 prices). He bought a bankrupt oil mill at Chinchpokli in 1869 and converted it to a cotton mill, which he renamed as Alexandra Mill. He sold the mill 2 years later for a profit. Later, in 1874, Jamsetji floated the Central India Spinning, Weaving, and Manufacturing Company in Nagpur because it seemed like a suitable place for him to establish another business venture. Due to this unconventional location, the people of Bombay scorned Tata for not making the smart move by taking the cotton business up in Bombay, known as the "Cottonopolis" of India. They did not understand why he went to Nagpur to start a new business.

He had four goals in life: setting up an iron and steel company, a world-class learning institution, a unique hotel and a hydroelectric plant. Only the hotel became a reality during his lifetime, with the inauguration of the Taj Mahal Hotel at Colaba waterfront in Mumbai on 3 December 1903.

In 1885, Tata floated another company in Pondicherry for the sole purpose of distributing Indian textiles to the nearby French Colonies and not having to pay duties; however, this failed due to insufficient demand for the fabrics. This led to his purchase of the Dharamsi Mills at Kurla in Bombay and later reselling it to buy the Advance Mills in Ahmedabad. Tata named it Advance Mills because it was one of the most high-tech mills at the time. On top of its technology, the company left a great effect on the city of Ahmedabad because Tata made an effort to integrate the mill within the city in order to provide economic growth to its community. Through these many contributions, Tata advanced the textile and cotton industry in India. Jamsetji Tata continued to be an important figure in the industrial world even in his later stages of life. Later on, Tata became a strong supporter of Swadeshism.

The Swadeshi Movement did not start until 1905; however, Tata represented these same principles throughout the time he was alive. Swadeshi was a political movement in British India that encouraged the production of domestic goods and the boycott of imported goods. Fully impressed by its principles, Tata named his new cotton mill built in Bombay the "Swadeshi Mill". The original idea for this new mill was to produce finer cloth, like the type coming from Manchester. Manchester was famous for producing softer cloth, and the coarse material produced in India was no longer preferred by the public.

Tata wanted to produce cloth of quality comparable with that of Manchester cloth in an attempt to reduce the number of imports coming from abroad. He had a vision for India to be the primary manufacturer of all kinds of cloth and eventually become an exporter. He wanted India to be the sole maker of the fine cloths for which the primitive weavers of India were famous. Tata started to experiment with various ways to improve the cultivation of cotton grown in different parts of India. He believed that adopting the method of cultivation used by the Egyptian ryot, who were famous for their soft cotton would allow for the cotton industry of India to reach these goals. Tata was the first to introduce the ring spindle into his mills, which soon replaced the throstle that was once used by manufacturers.

His successors' work led to the three remaining ideas being achieved:

- Tata Steel (formerly TISCO – Tata Iron and Steel Company Limited) is Asia's first and India's largest steel company. It became the world's fifth-largest steel company after it acquired Corus Group producing 28 million tonnes of steel annually.

== Philanthropy ==
Jamsetji donated generously mainly for education and healthcare. He was named the greatest philanthrope of the 20th century by EdelGive Foundation and Hurun Research India. He topped the list of the world's top philanthropists of the 20th century with an estimated donation of $102 billion adjusted for inflation. Shrimad Rajchandra, the Jain spiritual mentor of Mahatma Gandhi, is said to have left a deep impression on Jamsetji Tata. Once during a visit to his opulent residence in Bombay, in the course of their interaction, Rajchandra spoke about the transient nature of material wealth and non-attachment, an idea that some interpretations associate with the philanthropic vision of the Tata Group.

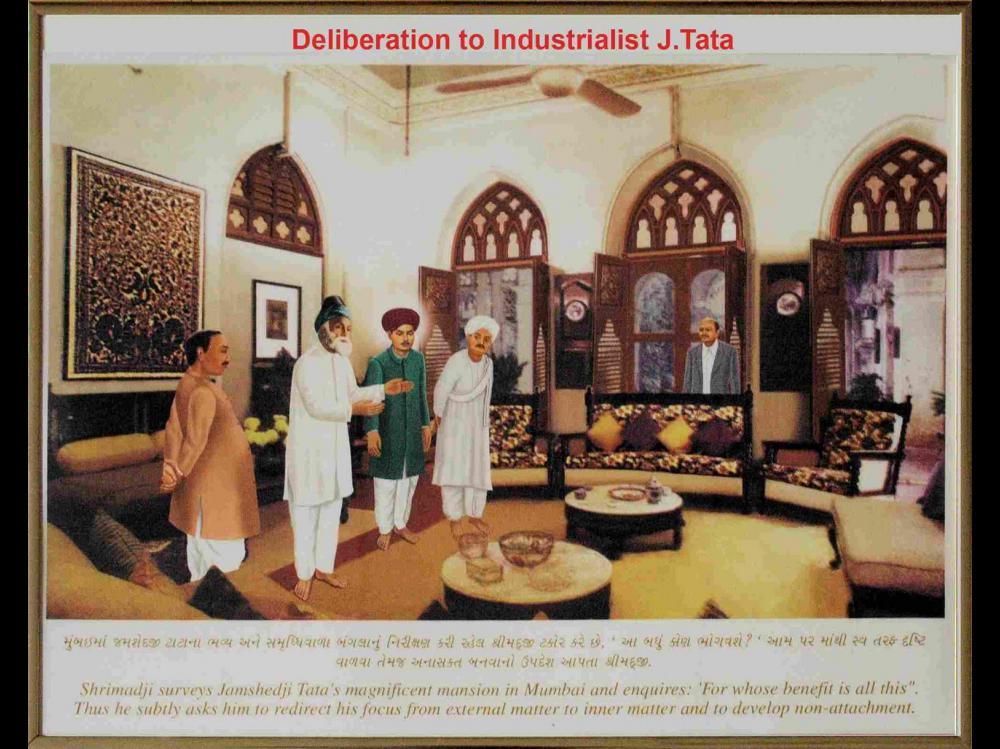
A portrait at New York Jain temple depicting Shrimad Rajchandra and Jamsetji Tata at his bungalow where Shrimad spoke about insignificance of transient material possessions

== Personal life ==
Tata married Hirabai Daboo. They had two children, Dorab and Ratan, the former of whom succeeded Tata as the chair of the Tata Group.

Tata's first cousin was Ratanji Dadabhoy Tata, who played an important role in the establishment of Tata Group. His sister Jerbai, through marriage to a Mumbai merchant, became the mother of Shapurji Saklatvala, who Tata employed to successfully prospect for coal and iron ore in Odisha and Bihar. Saklatvala later settled in England, initially to manage Tata's Manchester office, and later became a Communist Member of the British Parliament.

Through his cousin, Ratanji Dadabhoy, he was the uncle of entrepreneur JRD Tata and Sylla Tata; the latter was married to Dinshaw Maneckji Petit, the third baronet of Petits. The baronet's sister Rattanbai Petit, was the wife of Muhammad Ali Jinnah, the founder of Pakistan.

== Death ==
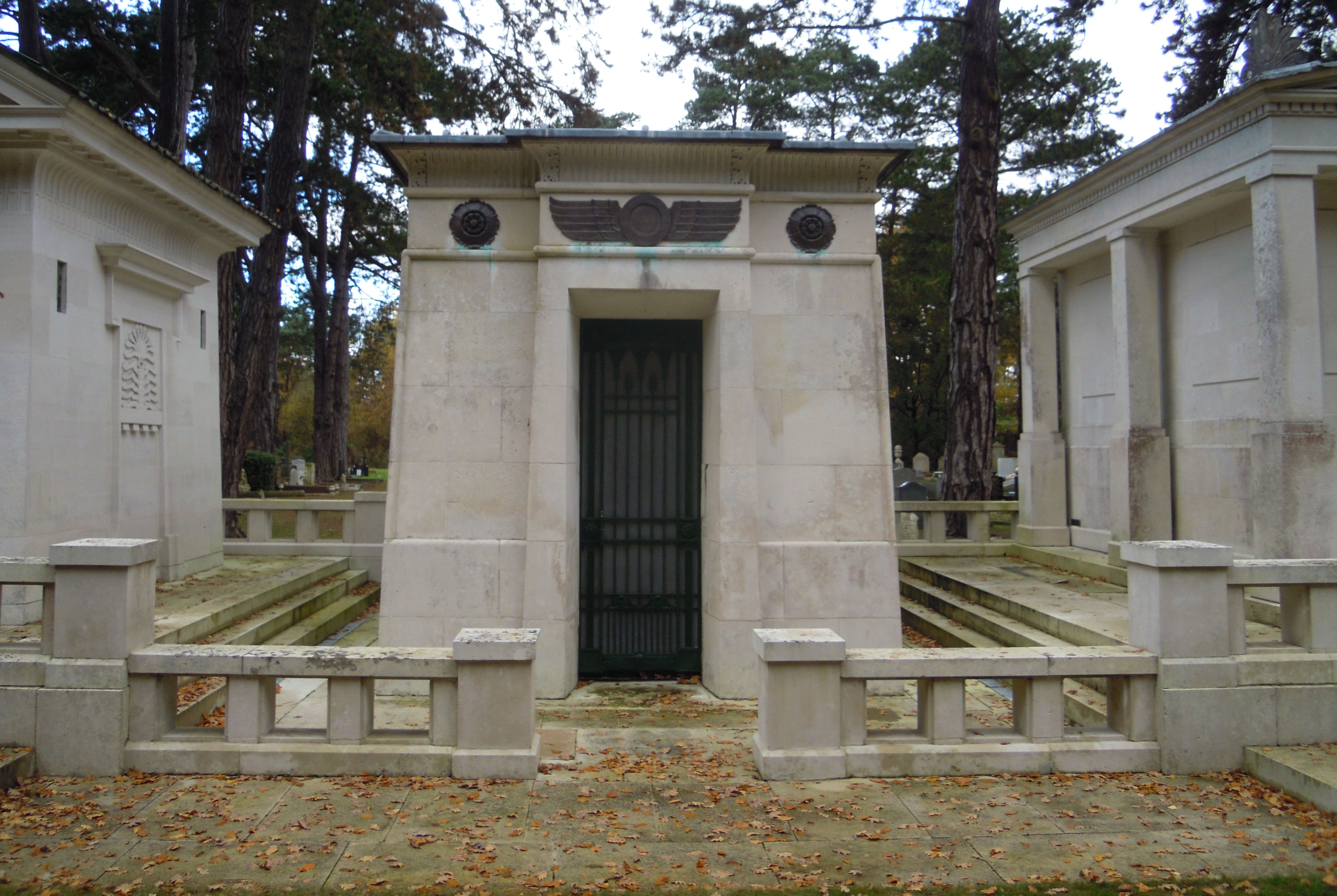
Mausoleum of Jamsetji Tata in Brookwood Cemetery

While on a business trip to Germany in 1900, Tata became seriously ill. He died in Bad Nauheim on 19 May 1904, and was buried in the Parsi burial ground in Brookwood Cemetery, Woking, England.

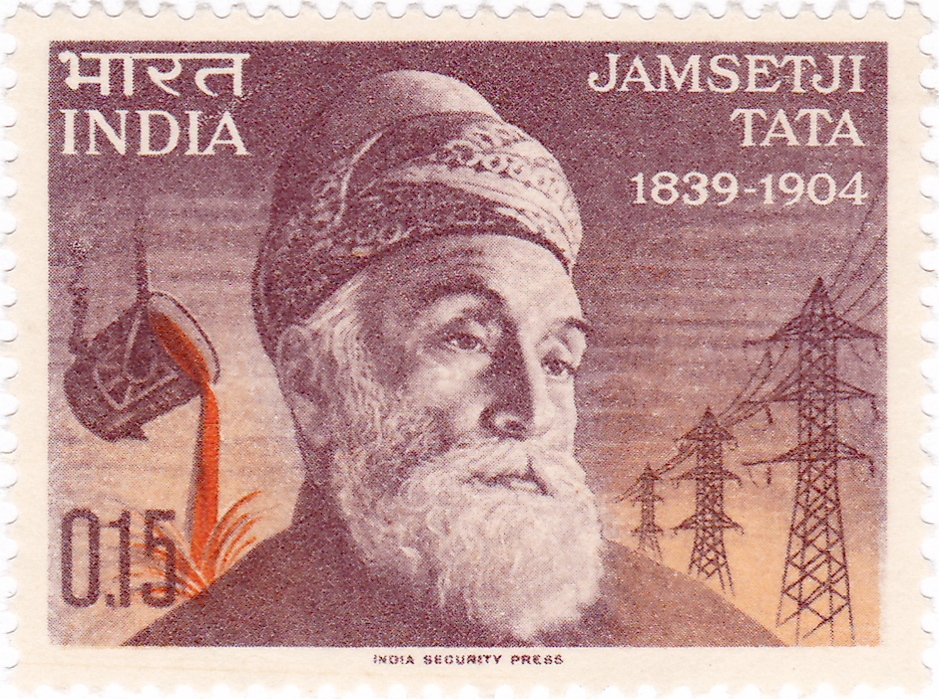
A commemorative postage stamp on Jamsetji Tata was issued on 7 January 1965 by India Post.

== Quotes ==
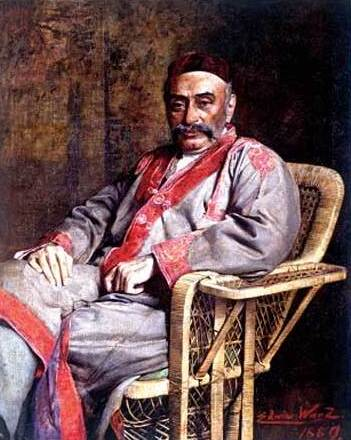
Tata painting by Edwin Arthur Ward

"When you have to give the lead in action, in ideas – a lead which does not fit in with the very climate of opinion – that is true courage, physical or mental or spiritual, call it what you like, and it is this type of courage and vision that Jamsetji Tata showed. It is right that we should honour his memory and remember him as one of the big founders of modern India." — Jawaharlal Nehru

"While many others worked on loosening the chains of slavery and hastening the march towards the dawn of freedom, Tata dreamed of and worked for life as it was to be fashioned after liberation. Most of the others worked for freedom from a bad life of servitude; Tata worked for freedom for fashioning a better life of economic independence." —Zakir Husain, the former president of India

"That he was a man of destiny is clear. It would seem, indeed, as if the hour of his birth, his life, his talents, his actions, the chain of events which he set in motion or influenced, and the services he rendered to his country and to his people, were all pre-destined as part of the greater destiny of India." —JRD Tata

Business positions
New title Founder of the Tata Group	Chairman of Tata Group; 1868-1904	Succeeded by Dorabji Tata
