= Rattanbai Jinnah =

Wife of Muhammad Ali Jinnah (1900 – 1929)

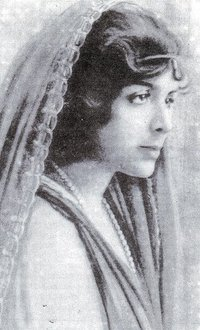
- Born: Rattanbai Petit; 20 February 1900; Bombay, British India
- Died: 20 February 1929 (aged 29); Bombay, British India
- Spouse: Muhammad Ali Jinnah (m. 1918; sep. 1927)
- Children: Dina Wadia
- Family: Jinnah family; Petit family

Rattanbai Jinnah (née Petit, also known as Mariam Jinnah; 20 February 1900 – 20 February 1929), informally known as Ruttie, was the wife of Muhammad Ali Jinnah, an important figure in the creation of Pakistan and the country's founding father.

Petit belonged to two of the most influential families of the Indian Subcontinent, the Petit family through her father and the Jinnah family through her marriage to Muhammad Ali Jinnah. Her daughter Dina Wadia was married to Bombay Dyeing chairman Neville Wadia.

== Early life and background ==
Rattanbai Petit (often informally called "Ruttie") was born on 20 February 1900 in Bombay, into the extremely affluent and well-connected Petit family that belonged to the Parsi community. She was the only daughter of the businessman Sir Dinshaw Petit, the second baronet Petit, and his wife Lady Dinabai Petit. Her paternal grandfather, Dinshaw Maneckji Petit, the first baronet, had built some of the earliest cotton mills in India. He was also a philanthropist who aided the Zoroastrians of Iran who were persecuted by the Qajars. Her brother, Fali, who later became Sir Dinshaw Maneckji Petit, the 3rd Baronet, was married to Sylla Tata, a member of the Tata family. Her other brother was Jamshed Petit. Rattanbai's uncle, Bomanjee Dinshaw Petit and cousin, Jehangir Bomanji Petit, were noted industrialists, and her cousin was the activist Mithuben Petit. Rattanbai Petit was famous in Bombay. Not only was she the well-read, fashionable, extroverted, and nationalistic daughter of the 2nd Baronet, she was considered beautiful. As she entered her late teens she was called "The Flower of Bombay" by the city's high society, many of which were frequent guests in her father's home.

The Petits were an extremely anglicized family that strove to be fully British in manner, dress, language, diet, and customs. The 2nd Baronet would import only the finest flowers, marble, and furniture from Europe for his home. Every room had multiple Persian rugs, and Petit Hall even had a Grecian fountain. Unsurprisingly, they spared their children almost no luxuries. Ruttie's father would shower her with gifts of books, clothes, pets, sweets, gourmet meals, and vacations to Europe or other parts of India where they owned homes. Ruttie was a huge lover of fashion and was allowed to go shopping unattended and purchase anything she wanted; with no spending limits. Her parents left most of the raising of their children to European nannies. While her paternal grandparents were practising orthodox Zoroastrians, Ruttie was agnostic and only nominally a Parsi. None of the Petit children were raised in Zoroastrianism, nor was Gujarati spoken in the home. Ruttie and her brothers did receive Navjote ceremonies, but they were only done as an excuse to throw a grand party afterward.

== Courtship and wedding ==
Muhammad Ali Jinnah, then 42, was only three years younger than Ruttie's father, and the two men were good friends. Jinnah was a frequent guest at Petit Hall, the sprawling seaside residence of the Petit family at the foot of Malabar Hill in Mumbai. It was in this setting that Ruttie and Jinnah became acquainted. They were both nationalists, loved horses, and were avidly interested in politics. Their romance, however, started in Darjeeling, while the two were thrown together on a vacation by her unsuspecting family.

Despite an age difference of twenty-four years, and the fact that Ruttie was sixteen at the time, the two decided to get married. Jinnah broached the topic with his friend by first discussing the question of interfaith and inter-community marriages, always a controversial topic in India. Here he was sure of drawing a favorable response from the baronet. Having drawn his friend out to make a general statement in support of mixed marriages, Jinnah then made his proposal to marry his friend's daughter. The baronet was shocked beyond words; he had never imagined anything other than a benign paternalistic relationship between his friend and his daughter. He reacted with violent indignation to the idea and almost ordered Jinnah out of his house. From the Petits' point of view, it was not just the question of religion, but also that of the age difference, especially given that Jinnah was 40, that appalled them.

"She was, after all, not yet sixteen, an age when modern parents of the new century did not expect their daughters to rush into marriage, although in more conventional homes girls were either betrothed or already married by that age. Sir Dinshaw’s only sister, Humabai, after having gone to a French boarding school in Nice for her baccalaureate, was still single at twenty-nine and not an eyebrow was raised."

Since Ruttie was underage, her father was able to prevent the marriage for the time being, and the matter brewed for more than a year with no resolution. Ruttie was the only daughter (she had three brothers) of her parents, and they always celebrated her birthday in grand style. Despite the tensions within the family, they could hardly give her coming-of-age birthday a miss, and a grand banquet was held on the occasion at the Taj Mahal Hotel in Mumbai. After the baronet had regaled his guests with a witty after-dinner speech, Ruttie stood up saying "Thank you, Papa..." and went on to drop a bombshell. She calmly informed the gathering that she had accepted a proposal of marriage from Jinnah, and that they would be married shortly; she asked the audience to wish them joy. She sat down to thundering silence, but despite the palpable outrage and opposition, a matter which had become so public could not be undone, and Ruttie could not be persuaded to change her mind. Even to the end, her parents could never reconcile themselves to the turn of events. Their objections were manifold: the difference of religion, the vast difference in age, the feeling of having been betrayed by a man they had always regarded as a friend. When the time came for Ruttie to abandon the Parsi community and be received into the Muslim community, she was disowned and thrown off by her family and had to leave her father's house forthwith. In 1918, only weeks after her 18th birthday, Ruttie married the 42-year-old Muhammad Ali Jinnah and cut all ties with her family and the Parsi community.

The Parsi community was outraged at not only Ruttie, but also her parents. After the marriage of Ratanji Dadabhoy Tata to the Frenchwoman Suzanne Brière, (who later converted to Zoroastrianism), many conservative Parsis were concerned of the rapid anglicization, indifference to religion, and materialistic lifestyle of the Parsi elite. Furthermore, most Parsi youth of Ruttie's age from wealthy families at the time were either indifferent to religion or full-blown atheists, and their parents did precious little to educate them religiously. After the marriage of Jinnah and Ruttie, it was the final straw and the conservative Parsis and mobeds called for all of their youth to be religiously re-educated. Regarding the Petit family, they were given two choices by the Parsi Panchayat. They could either be excommunicated along with their daughter, or remain within the community provided they publicly disinherit their daughter and sever all contact with her. Her family chose the latter, but Lady Dinshaw strove to be a part of her granddaughter's life and was able to do so after Ruttie and Jinnah separated.

== Marital problems ==
The Jinnahs resided mainly at South Court Mansion in Malabar Hill, a stone's throw from Petit Hall. However, there was no contact between them and the Petit family, and the estrangement continued even after the birth of Ruttie's only child, Dina Wadia, the following year. In addition to the estrangement from her own family, Ruttie was also ex-communicated from the Parsi Community with extraordinary measures and censure, and a complete ostracization from their social gatherings.

When Ruttie moved in with her pets, she came to what was essentially an empty house. At the very beginning of their marriage, Jinnah surrendered his home and his closet to her. She was allowed to completely furbish the house exactly the way she liked it. In regard to Jinnah's wardrobe, Jinnah knew she had an eye for fashionable clothes, and allowed her to not only buy and coordinate his suits but also style his hair. Undoubtedly, Jinnah benefited from this arrangement as it presented him politically as a fashionable, modern Muslim man. They also made frequent trips to Europe and spent considerable lengths of time there. They made for a head-turning couple, not just because they looked an unlikely mismatched pair, but also because Ruttie aspired to define the acme of fashion and money was absolutely no object. Her long hair would be decked in fresh flowers, she wore vibrant silks and chiffons, accentuated by headbands and tiaras lavish with diamonds, rubies and emeralds. Her main choice of dress was a sleeveless blouse with chiffon saris. Her daring wardrobe would not only shock the Muslim community, but also the British. According to most sources, the couple could not have been happier in their first few years of marriage. Their only child, a daughter named Dina, was born prematurely on 15 August 1919. Dina was neglected by both her parents during the first eight years of her life as her father was preoccupied with politics and her mother left their daughter to the care of nannies and servants. In fact, Dina was not given a name by either of her parents.

Jinnah's sister, Fatima, who had been a ward of her brother from the age of eight after their father's death in 1901, was not amenable to the marriage either. In an attempt to make way for the new bride, Fatima was initially bundled off to another sister's home, but later had become used to spending her Sundays at the Jinnah residence at South Court. The young Ruttie, already a mother at 19, found that she was no longer the sole recipient of Jinnah's attentions. It did not help that she and Fatima were of very different temperaments. Ruttie had even yelled at Fatima (considered dour, and very close in personal characteristics in her austerity and fastidiousness, to Jinnah) once, upon seeing her reading the Quran regularly, “the Quran is a book to be talked about, not to be read!” Jinnah enrolled Fatima in a Dental College in 1919. In 1923, he also helped Fatima Jinnah set up her own clinic in Bombay. Yet, this did little in bridging the gap that had developed between Jinnah and Ruttie.

By mid-1922, Jinnah was facing political isolation (almost reflecting Ruttie's own ex-communication from the Parsi community) as he devoted every spare moment to be the voice of separatist incitement in a nation torn by Hindu-Muslim antipathy. His increasingly late hours and the ever-increasing distance between them left Ruttie feeling neglected. The infatuation had worn out, and Jinnah found the demands made on him onerous and vexatious. The change was not something which Ruttie could understand or accept. Her complex relationship with her husband can be gleaned by reading some extracts of her last letter to him:

"...When one has been as near to the reality of Life (which after all is Death) as I have been, dearest, one only remembers the beautiful and tender moments and all the rest becomes a half-veiled mist of unrealities. Try and remember me, beloved, as the flower you plucked and not the flower you tread upon..." and late in the letter, ".. Darling I love you – I love you – and had I loved you just a little less I might have remained with you – only after one has created a very beautiful blossom one does not drag it through the mire. The higher you set your ideal the lower it falls. I have loved you my darling as it is given to few men to be loved. I only beseech you that the tragedy which commenced in love should also end with it...".

== Last days and death ==
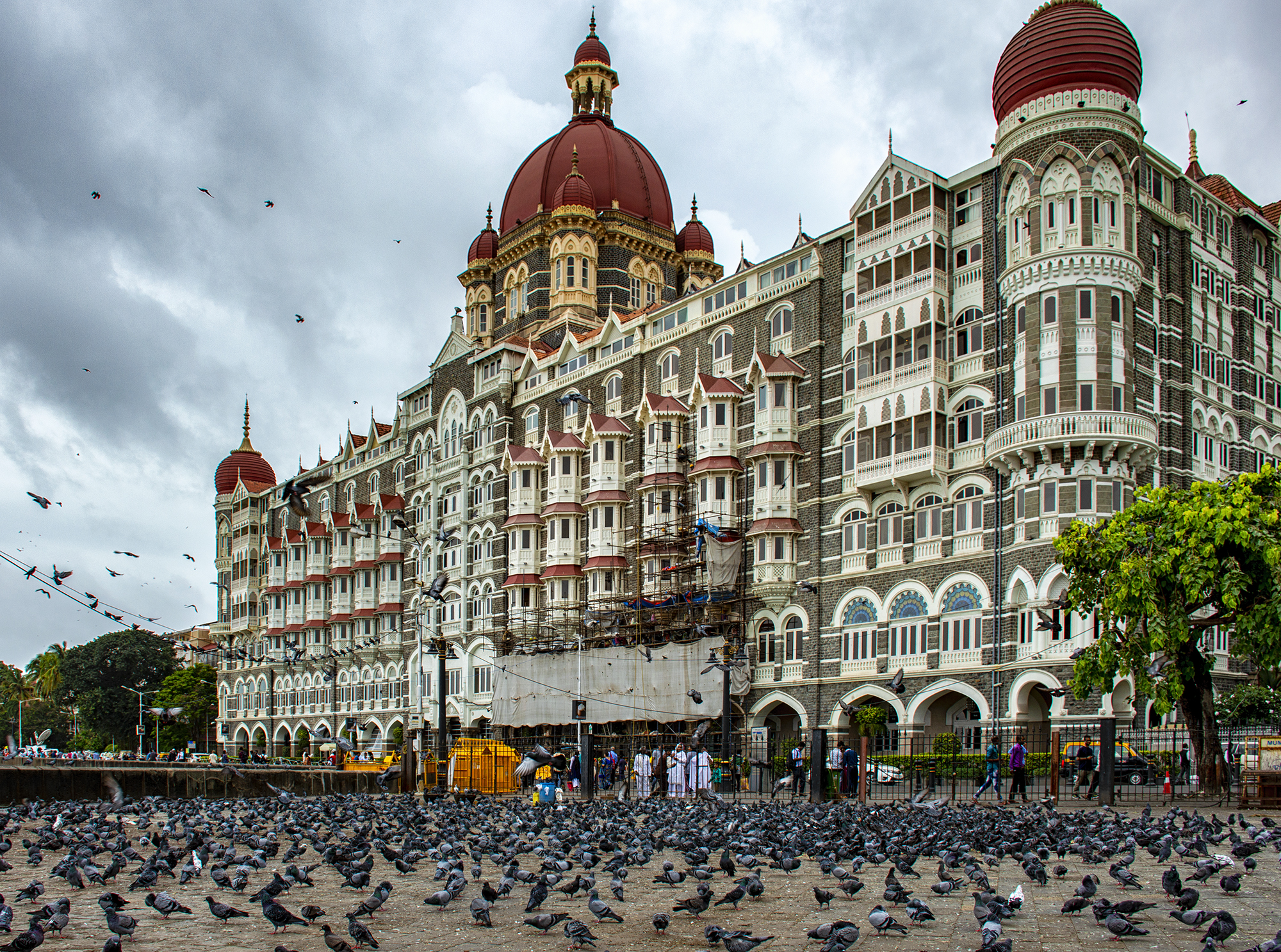
The Taj Mahal Palace Hotel in Mumbai, where Petit spent last years of her life.

After Ruttie and Jinnah separated, their daughter was able to meet Ruttie's mother. Lady Petit became very close to her granddaughter, and due to their closeness Dina chose to take her maternal grandmother's first name.

Ruttie Jinnah developed intestinal ailments and cancer was speculated to be the cause. She also suffered from depression, which was not well understood at the time. In early 1928, she moved into a suite at Bombay's Taj Mahal Palace Hotel, leaving Jinnah home with eight-year-old Dina. That spring, while visiting Paris with her mother, Ruttie fell into an unexplained coma and almost died. Two months later, on 19 February 1929, Ruttie fell unconscious in her room at the Taj Mahal Palace Hotel in Mumbai. She died the next day, 20 February, on her 29th birthday. Family friends believed that she had died from cancer while her daughter Dina maintained that she died from colitis. Jinnah was in Delhi at the time, so he didn't find out about his wife's death until his father-in-law called him from Bombay to inform him that Ruttie had died.

According to Haji Bhai Esmail Dossa, a Bombay-based businessman, who was a client of Jinnah, Ruttie and Jinnah never separated. Despite being ill with cancer, she had thrown a small luncheon party for "Jay" (Jinnah) and their immediate families on his 52nd birthday at the Taj Mahal Hotel Ballroom on 25 December 1928.

Years after the death of his wife, Jinnah confided to a friend, "she was a child, I shouldn't have married her. It was my mistake", referring to what Jinnah considered as "childish behavior" of Ruttie. Further, in an irony of sorts, his own stance on inter-faith and inter-community marriages was challenged when his daughter Dina decided to marry the Parsi industrialist Neville Wadia. In almost exactly the same way Sir Dinshaw Petit and Ruttie clashed, Jinnah too clashed with Dina over her desire to marry outside the Muslim community. Muhammad Ali Karim Chagla, who was Jinnah's assistant at the time, writes in his autobiography Roses in December: "Jinnah asked Dina 'there are millions of Muslim boys in India, is he the only one you were waiting for?' and Dina replied 'there were millions of Muslim girls in India, why did you marry my mother then?'" His response to her was "She became a Muslim."

Muhammad Ali Jinnah was a very private person who hardly showed his emotions. He is known to have wept twice in public; both occasions were connected to Ruttie. One of the occasions was her funeral in 1929; the other was in August 1947 when he visited her grave one last time before leaving for Pakistan. Jinnah left India in August 1947, never to return. After his wife's death and his daughter's marriage, it appeared that Jinnah missed them a great deal. G. Allana wrote a biography of Jinnah entitled Quaid-i-Azam Jinnah: The Story of a Nation, and he relates an anecdote made known to him by Jinnah's chauffeur. He quoted the chauffeur thus:

"You know servants in household come to know everything that is going around them. Sometimes more than twelve years after Begum Jinnah's [Mrs. Jinnah's] death, the boss would order at dead of night a huge ancient wooden chest to be opened, in which were stored clothes of his dead wife and his married daughter. He would intently look into those clothes, as they were taken out of box and were spread on the carpets. He would gaze at them for long with eloquent silence. Then his eyes turn moisten..."

== Bibliography ==
- Chagla, M. C. (1961), Individual and the State, Asia Publishing House.
- Reddy, Sheela (2017), Mr and Mrs Jinnah: The Marriage that Shook India, Penguin India.
- Wolpert, Stanley (1984), Jinnah of Pakistan, Oxford University Press. ISBN 0-614-21694-X
