= B.D. Petit Parsee General Hospital =

Hospital in Mumbai

Coordinates: 18.9688°N 72.8058°E

- Founded: 1907
- Founder: Bomanjee Dinshaw Petit
- Headquarters: Cumballa Hill, Mumbai
- Website: Official website

B.D. Petit Parsee General Hospital is a hospital in Cumballa Hill, Mumbai.

== History ==
In 1896, India experienced a serious famine, while the people in Mumbai suffered from many deadly diseases. Navroji Hormusji Patuck, manager of Petit Mills, proposed to the Petit family of setting up a hospital for the Parsee community. The hospital was founded by the noted Parsi Industrialist Bomanjee Dinshaw Petit. He offered Rs 500 and initiated the funding. Navroji Nusserwanji Wadia and Dr. Kekhushroo N Bahadurji donated Rs 10,000 on behalf of Parsee Panchayat. They set up a temporary hospital in Parel. Bomanji gave his property in Cumballa Hill Family Hotel and securities of INR50,000. The committee accepted his donation and agreed to name the hospital after him. In 1907, the foundation for the hospital was laid by the Governor of Bombay Sir George Clark. To run the hospital, it receives donations from the Zoroastrian community.

== Facilities ==
The hospital has a main wing, laundry, nutrition section, senior citizens home, dispensary and doctors' quarters. The main wing was renovated in 2009. The hospital offers a concession for the poor.
