= Dorabji Tata =

Indian industrialist and philanthropist (1859–1932)

Sir Dorabji Tata
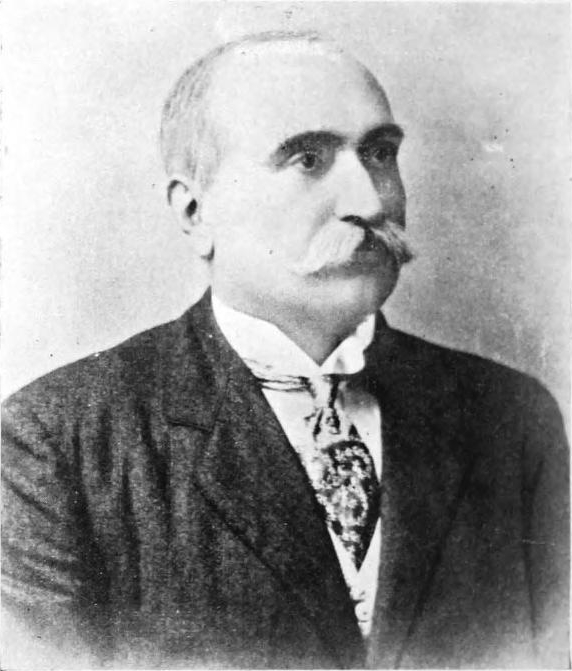
- Sir Dorabji Tata

2nd Chairman of Tata Sons and Tata Group
- In office 19 May 1904 – 3 June 1932
- Preceded by: Jamsetji Tata
- Succeeded by: Sir Nowroji Saklatvala

1st President of Indian Olympic Association
- In office 1927–1928
- Preceded by: Office established
- Succeeded by: Maharaja Bhupinder Singh of Patiala

Personal details
- Born: Dorabji Jamsetji Tata; 27 August 1859 Bombay, Bombay Presidency, British India
- Died: 3 June 1932 (aged 72) Bad Kissingen, Free State of Bavaria, Weimar Republic
- Spouse: Meherbai Bhabha
- Parents: Jamsetji Tata (father); Hirabai Tata (mother)
- Relatives: See Tata family
- Education: Cambridge University; University of Bombay
- Occupation: Industrialist; philanthropist
- Known for: Founder of Tata Steel, Tata Power and Tata Chemicals

Sir Dorabji Jamsetji Tata (27 August 1859 – 3 June 1932) was an Indian industrialist and philanthropist of the British Raj, and a key figure in the history and development of the Tata Group. He was knighted in 1910 for his contributions to industry in British India. He was the elder son of Jamsetji Tata, the founder of the Tata Group. He played a pioneering role by guiding India to the Olympics even before the establishment of an independent National Olympic Association.

== Early life and education ==
Dorab was the elder son of Parsi parents, Hirabai and Jamsetji Tata. Through an aunt, Jerbai Tata, who married a Bombay merchant, Dorabji Saklatvala, he was a cousin of Shapurji Saklatvala who later became a Communist member of the British Parliament.

Tata received his primary education at the Proprietary High School in Bombay (now Mumbai) before travelling to England in 1875, where he was privately tutored. He entered Gonville and Caius College, Cambridge, in 1877, where he remained for two years before returning to Bombay in 1879. He continued his studies at St. Xavier's College, Bombay, where he obtained a degree in 1882.

Upon graduating, Dorab worked for two years as a journalist at the Bombay Gazette. In 1884, he joined the cotton business division of his father's firm. He was first sent to Pondicherry, then a French colony, to determine whether a cotton mill might be profitable there. Thereafter, he was sent to Nagpur, to learn the cotton trade at the Empress Mills which had been founded by his father in 1877.

== Marriage ==
Dorabji's father, Jamsetji, had visited Mysore State in south India on business, and had met Dr. Hormusji Bhabha, a Parsi and the first Indian Inspector-General of Education of that state. While visiting the Bhabha home, he had met and approved of young Meherbai, Bhabha's only daughter. Returning to Bombay, Jamsetji sent Dorab to Mysore State, specifically to call on the Bhabha family. Dorab did so, and duly married Meherbai in 1897. The couple had no children.

Meherbai's grandfather was the industrialist Dinshaw Maneckji Petit and her brother, Jehangir Bhabha, was a reputed lawyer. He was the father of scientist Homi J. Bhabha. Thus Dorabji was Homi Bhabha's uncle by marriage. The Tata Group funded Bhabha's research and his research institutions, including the Tata Institute of Fundamental Research.

== Industrialist career ==
Dorabji was intimately involved in the fulfilment of his father's ideas of a modern iron and steel industry, and agreed to the necessity for hydroelectric electricity to power the industry. Dorab is credited with the establishment of the Tata Steel conglomerate in 1907, which his father founded and Tata Power in 1911, which are the core of the present-day Tata Group.

Dorabji accompanied the mineralogists searching for iron fields. It is said that his presence encouraged researchers to search areas that would otherwise have been neglected. Under Dorabji's management, the business that had once included three cotton mills and the Taj Hotel Bombay grew to include India's largest private sector steel company, three electric companies and one of India's leading insurance companies.

Founder of New India Assurance Co Ltd. in 1919, the largest General Insurance company in India, Dorabji Tata was knighted in January 1910 by Edward VII, becoming Sir Dorabji Tata.

== Non-business interest ==
Dorabji was extremely fond of sports, and was a pioneer in the Indian Olympic movement. He played an instrumental role in facilitating necessary arrangements to send Indian contingent to mark their first ever Olympic appearance during the 1920 Summer Olympics, especially coincidentally coming in at a critical juncture when a formal National Olympic Association was not yet established in India. He pledged his support to finance the Indian athletes targeting the 1920 Olympics in Antwerp, after witnessing impressive performance of the athletes during the 1919 sports meet held at the Deccan Gymkhana, Pune. It was revealed that Dorabji's passion in sports was elevated due to his patriotic sentimental values towards his country and it eventually prompted him to finance the athletes participation for the 1920 Summer Olympics. It was also quite serendipitous occasion when Dorabji himself was invited as a chief guest for the 1919 Deccan Gymkhana's annual sports gala event, where he took notes that some of the athletes nearly touched clocking timings similar to European standards. He approached Governor of Bombay, Lloyd George to help secure India's participation at the 1920 Olympics and more importantly, Lloyd George was also present at the 1919 Deccan Gymkhana event where he offered prizes for the athletes who had performed exceptionally well during the course of the competition. Dorabji Tata and Lloyd George were integral part of a committee which was formed to discuss on their ambitious attempts to send a contingent representing India at the 1920 Olympics and the committee decided to hold trials for Olympic selection at the Pune's Deccan Gymkhana where they finalised the list of athletes.

As president of the Indian Olympic Association, he financed the Indian contingent to the Paris Olympics in 1924. The Tata family, like most of India's big businessmen, were Indian nationalists. Tata was a member of the International Olympic Committee during most of the years between World War I and World War II.

He also devoted his passion to education aspects and played an instrumental role by assisting his father Jamsetji Tata to lay foundation to the Indian Institute of Science in 1909.

== Death ==
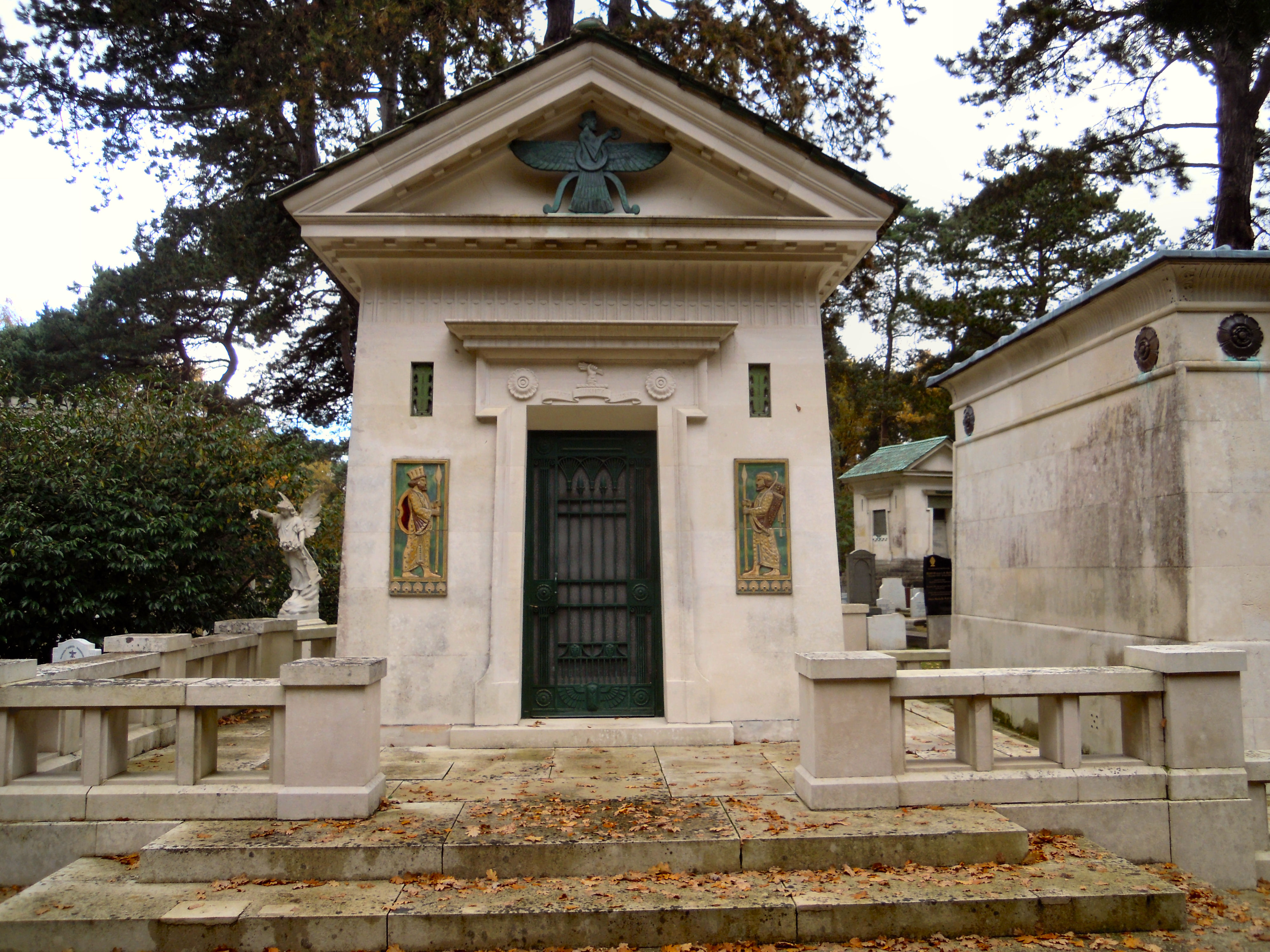
Mausoleum of Dorabji Tata in Brookwood Cemetery

Meherbai Tata died of leukaemia in 1931 at the age of 72. Shortly after her death, Dorabji established the Lady Tata Memorial Trust to advance study of diseases of the blood.

On 11 March 1932, one year after Meherbai's death and shortly before his own, he established a trust fund which was to be used "without any distinction of place, nationality or creed", for the advancement of learning and research, disaster relief, and other philanthropic purposes. That trust is today known as the Sir Dorabji Tata Trust. Dorabji additionally provided the seed money to fund the setting up of India's premier scientific and engineering research institution, the Indian Institute of Science, Bangalore. He had earlier funded a major new building for the Department of Engineering, University of Cambridge.

Dorabji died in Bad Kissingen, Germany, on 3 June 1932, at the age of 73. He is buried alongside his wife Meherbai in Brookwood Cemetery, Woking, England. They had no children.

Business positions
Preceded by Jamsetji Tata	Chairman of Tata Group; 1904–1932	Succeeded by Nowroji Saklatwala
Civic offices
New title First holder	President of the Indian Olympic Association; 1927–1928	Succeeded by Bhupinder Singh of Patiala
