= Mithuben Petit =

Indian nationalist activist (1892–1973)

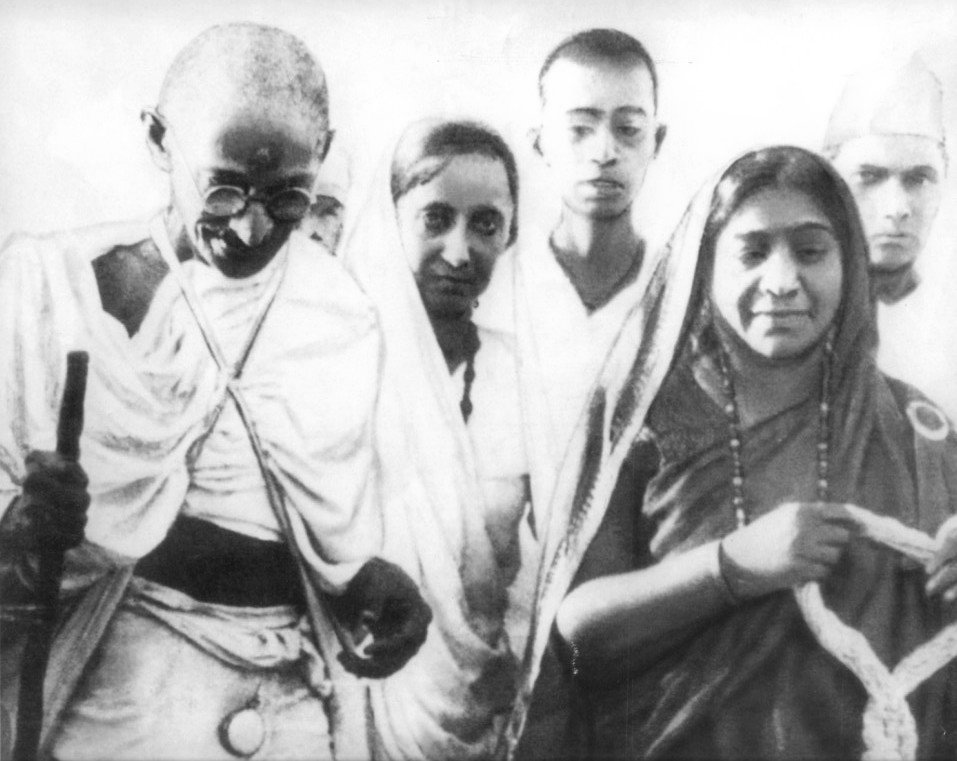
- Mahatma Gandhi, Petit (centre), and Sarojini Naidu in 1930
- Born: 11 April 1892; Bombay, British India
- Died: 16 July 1973 (aged 81); Surat, Gujarat, India
- Education: Convent of Jesus and Mary
- Occupation: Indian independence activist
- Relatives: Petit family
- Awards: Padma Shri 1961

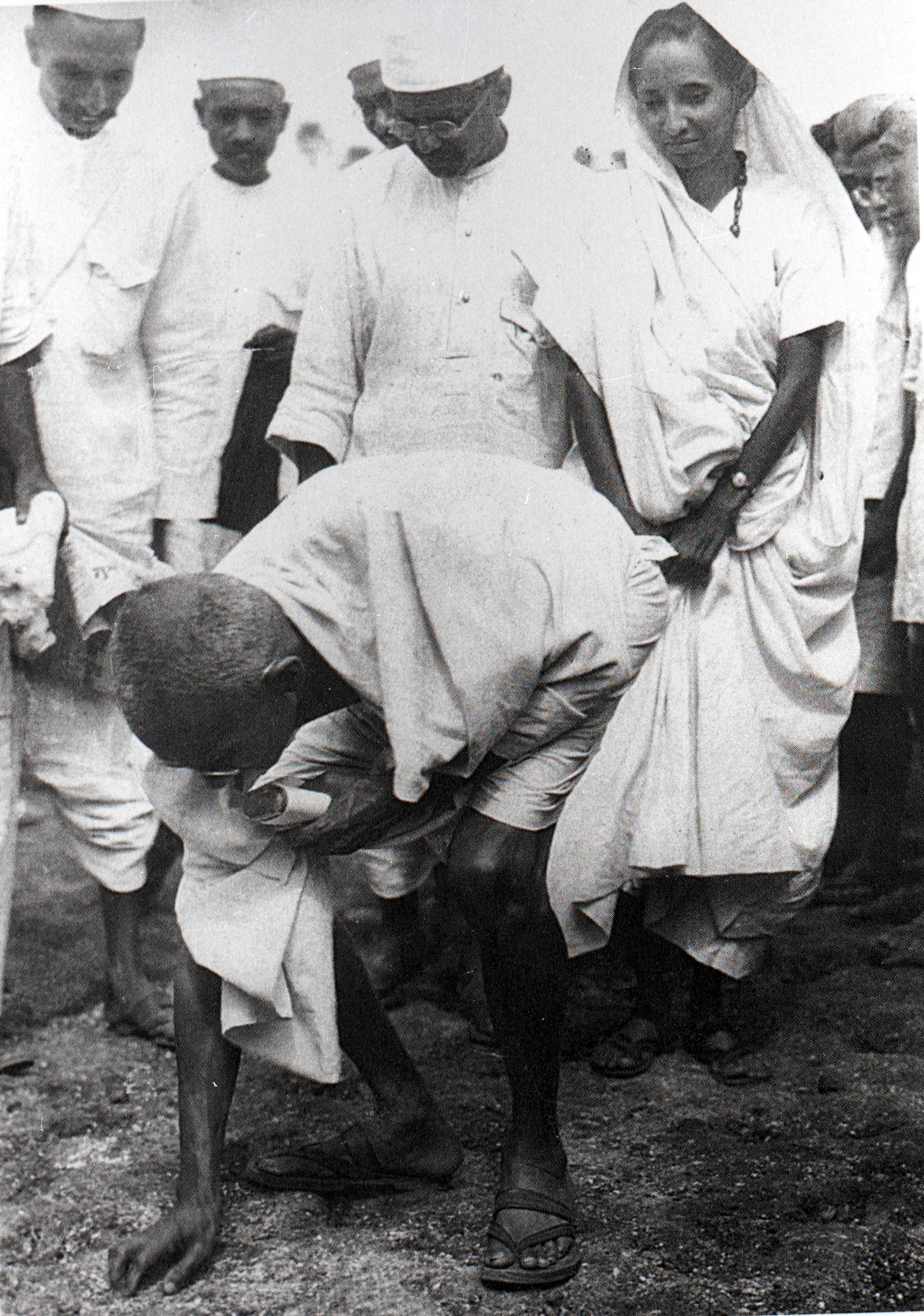
Mahatma Gandhi at Dandi 6 April 1930. Behind him is his second son Manilal Gandhi and Mithuben Petit.

Mithuben Hormusji Petit (11 April 1892 – 16 July 1973) was an Indian independence activist who participated in Mahatma Gandhi's Dandi March. A pioneer female independence activist, she was the Secretary of the Rashtriya Stree Sabha, a women's movement founded on Gandhian ideals. She became a recipient of India’s fourth highest-civilian honour, Padma Shri in 1961, for her social work.

== Family and background ==
Born on 11 April 1892 into an affluent Parsi Zoroastrian family in Bombay. Petit's father was one of the sons of Sir Dinshaw Maneckji Petit, a well-known industrialist, philanthropist, and Baronet. Mithuben was the niece of industrialist Bomanjee Dinshaw Petit and cousin of Jehangir Bomanji Petit and Rattanbai Petit.

Petit studied at Convent of Jesus and Mary, Colaba. Her activism was met with challenges by the Petit family, who urged her to renounce her activism or risk disinheritance, to which she refused and responded: "It is your business to sit with the government and mine to remain with the nation.".

== Career ==
=== Indian independence movement ===
Petit was influenced by her aunt, Jaiji Jehangir Petit, who was a follower of Mahatma Gandhi and was the Secretary of the Rashtriya Stree Sabha, a women's movement founded on Gandhian ideals. She was active in the relief work during the floods of Gujarat in 1927, along with Ratanbahen Mehta and Bhaktiba Desai. During Bardoli Satyagraha in 1928, she moved from village to village to create awareness among the women. She took part in Borsad Satyagraha in 1929 and stayed at the camp.

Petit, along with Kasturba Gandhi and Sarojini Naidu, played a major part in the Salt March, with Kasturba Gandhi beginning the march at Sabarmati, Sarojini Naidu lifting the salt for the first time at Dandi on 6 April 1930 and Petit standing behind Mahatma Gandhi when he repeated the violation at Bhimrad on 9 April 1930. The march was one of the most important events in the Indian independence movement. In a time when women were forced to take a back seat (due to the patriarchal culture at that time in India) Petit was one of the three women who played a pivotal role in the march and the civil disobedience against tax on salt. Petit participated in the Bardoli Satyagraha of 1928 which was a no enhancement campaign against the British Raj where she worked under the guidance of Sardar Patel. Petit was instrumental in the anti-liquor movement in India and spent time with Mahatma Gandhi and explained the liquor issue with the schedule tribes in Gujarat.

=== Social work ===
Petit set up an ashram in Maroli called Kasturba Vanat Shala or Kasturba Sevashram in 1930, which taught underprivileged children from families of Adivasis, Harijans and fisher folk spinning, carding, weaving, dairy farming, leather-work and a Diploma Course in Sewing, to make the women self-sufficient. Petit, known as "Maiji" (mother) also opened a hospital of the same name for the scientific treatment of mentally ill patients in 1942.

== Death ==
She died on 16 July 1973, at Surat.

== Recognition ==
Petit received the Padma Shri in 1961 for her social work.
