= Bomanjee Dinshaw Petit =

Indian cotton mill owner (1859–1915)

Seth Bomanjee Dinshaw Petit (27 March 1859 – 17 December 1915) was a noted cotton mill owner, founder of the B. D. Petit Parsee General Hospital and a philanthropist from Bombay.

Petit was born on 27 March 1859 into the business influential Petit family. He was the third son of the industrialist Dinshaw Maneckji Petit, the 1st Baronet and his wife, Sakarbai Panday. He was married to Goolbai Jeejeebhoy. His sons, Jehangir Bomanji Petit, Dhunjibhoy Bomanji Petit and Pherozesha Bomanji Petit later inherited most of the family’s business. Noted activist Mithuben Petit and Rattanbai Petit were his nieces.

Bomanji Dinshaw Petit inherited a large portion of his father's estate and was owner of Petit Mills. He was one of the founders of the London School of Tropical Medicine to which he donated £6,666. In a letter to Sir Francis Lovell (Dean of the School), quoted in The Times in 1902, he wrote the following about the school:

This institution, whilst according ample scope to students of diseases that well nigh devastate the East, will be the means of bringing the Western and Eastern minds together to afford help to the suffering East, and thus cementing that union of hearts.

Bomanji Dinshaw Petit was the President of the Mill Owners' Association; a Director of the Bank of Bombay for ten years and served as its President in 1903. He founded the Bomanjee Dinshaw Petit Parsee General Hospital and served as its President for many years. He was father of Jehangir Bomanji Petit, who impressed on him to make the munificent donation of the property called Cumballa Hotel; this led to the foundation of Bomanjee Dinshaw Petit Parsee General Hospital in 1907. He was on the Board of the Victoria Jubilee Technical Institute, Vice-President of Bombay Presidency Association, and founder and Managing Director of the newspaper Indian Daily Mail.

Seth Bomanji Dinshaw Petit died on 17 December 1915.
