= Dinshaw Maneckji Petit =

Indian baronet, entrepreneur, businessman and philanthropist (1823-1901)

Sir Dinshaw Maneckji Petit Bt
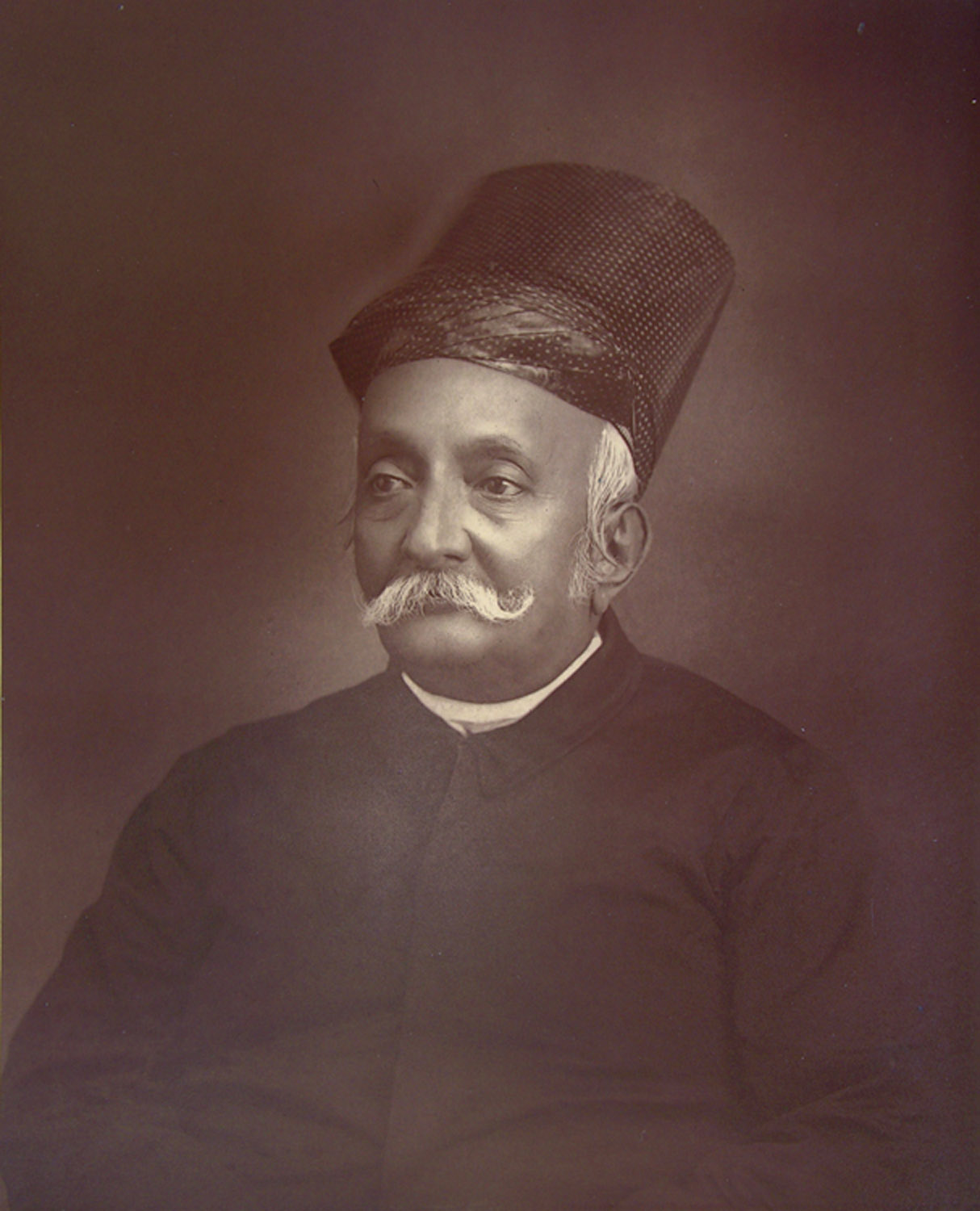
- Born: Dinshaw Maneckji Petit; 30 June 1823; Bombay, British India
- Died: 5 May 1901 (aged 77); Bombay, British India
- Occupations: Businessman; Philanthropist
- Spouse: Sakarbai Panday
- Children: 14
- Relatives: see Petit family

Sir Dinshaw Maneckji Petit, 1st Baronet (30 June 1823 – 5 May 1901) was an Indian industrialist and philanthropist who founded the first textile mills in India. He was part of the Petit family and became the first Petit baronet. He founded the "Persian Zoroastrian Amelioration Fund" in 1854 and was a member of the Governor-General's Legislative Council.

== Life and background ==
Dinshaw Maneckji Petit was born in Bombay, Bombay Presidency, British India, to Maneckji Nusserwanjee Petit and Humabai Petit. He had one brother, Nusserwanjee Maneckji Petit.

In 1837, he married Sakarbai Panday, with whom he had 14 children, six sons and eight daughters. Among his children were, Ruttonbai Petit Panday, Framji Dinshaw Petit, Bomanjee Dinshaw Petit, Heerabai Petit and Cowasji Dinshaw Petit. His grandson Jeejeebhoy Framji Petit succeeded him as the 2nd Baronet, under special remainder in 1901, and changed his name from Jeejeebhoy Framji Petit to Dinshaw Maneckjee Petit.

His son Bomanjee Dinshaw Petit inherited most of his business. His granddaughter Mithuben Hormusji Petit was a female activist in the Indian independence movement. His great-grandson, Framjee Dinshaw Petit, went on to become Sir Dinshaw Maneckji Petit, the 3rd Baronet, and was married to Sylla Tata, sister of J.R.D Tata, a prominent member of the Tata family. Framjee's sister, Ratanbai Petit was the wife of the founder of Pakistan, Muhammad Ali Jinnah. Their daughter, Dina Wadia, was married to Bombay Dyeing chairman Neville Wadia.

His granddaughter Meherbai Bhabha (née Panday) was mother of the nuclear scientist Homi J. Bhabha. His other grandson was industrialist Jehangir Bomanji Petit.

His grandson Dinshaw Maneckjee Petit, 2nd Baronet achieved notoriety for his tax evasion and his penchant to set up shell companies to reduce his tax liability. The case of Dinsaw Maneckjee Petit is one of the few occasions where the government has seen fit to lift the corporate veil, due to the egregious nature of the tax avoidance.

== Career ==
As broker to European firms, Petit amassed a large fortune during the period of speculation in Bombay at the time of the American Civil War. He founded the Manockji Petit Spinning & Weaving Mills.

In 1854, Petit founded the "Persian Zoroastrian Amelioration Fund" with the aim of improving the conditions for the less fortunate Zoroastrian co-religionists in Iran. The fund succeeded in convincing a number of Iranian Zoroastrians to migrate to India (where they are today known as Iranis), and may have been instrumental in obtaining a remission of the jizya poll tax for their co-religionists in 1882.

In 1886, he became a member of the Governor-General's Legislative Council, where he was criticized for playing a pro-colonial role despite being a non-official nominee to the council. He was referred to as a "gilded sham" and a "magnificent non-entity" by the nationalists. He devoted his wealth to philanthropic objects, among the public and private charities which he endowed being the Towers of Silence and fire temples for the Parsi Zoroastrian community, a hospital for animals named Bai Sakarbai Dinshaw Petit Hospital for Animals (named after his wife), a college for women, and the Petit hospital.

For the advancement of technical education, Petit also donated premises worth Rs. 3,00,000 at Byculla, Bombay, to the Victoria Jubilee Technical Institute (VJTI), which was recognized by the Government of Bombay as the Central Technological Institute, Bombay Province. In winter 1923, the institute relocated to its present location in Matunga, Bombay (now Mumbai).

He was knighted by the British Crown in 1887, and on 1 September 1890, he became the first Petit baronet of Petit Hall, Bombay. The baronetcy was created with remainder to Framjee Petit, second son of the first Baronet, and the heirs male of his body, failing which to the heirs male of the body of the first Baronet. Framjee predeceased his father in 1895. Consequently, upon the death of the first Baronet in 1901, the title was inherited by Framjee's son, Jeejeebhoy Framjee Petit. By Special Act of the Legislative Council of India, all holders of the title were to relinquish their own name on succession and assume those of the first Baronet.

The Petit surname is not traditionally Parsi and had come about in Sir Dinshaw's grandfather's time in the 18th century. He had worked as a shipping clerk and interpreter for the British East India Company. French merchants who dealt with the lively, short Parsi clerk called him "le petit Parsi".

== Death ==
Petit died on 5 May 1901 in Bombay. A posthumous portrait of the 1st Baronet was painted by Sir James Linton.

== Styles ==
- 1823-1886: Dinshaw Maneckji Petit
- 1886-1887: Dinshaw Maneckji Petit, C.S.I.
- 1887-1890: Sir Dinshaw Maneckji Petit
- 1890-1901: Sir Dinshaw Maneckji Petit, Bt

Baronetage of the United Kingdom
New creation	Baronet (of Petit Hall); 1890–1901	Succeeded by Dinshaw Maneckjee Petit
