= Petit baronets =

Hereditary nobility

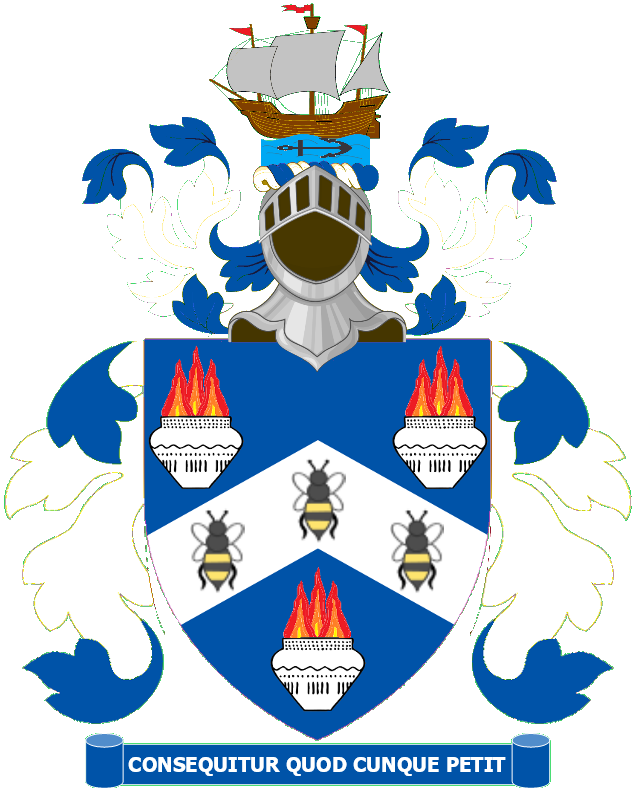
- Coat of arms of the Petit baronets
- Creation date: 1890
- Status: extant
- Motto: Consequitur quodcunque petit, He obtains whatever he asks

Petit family
- Origin: Bombay, British India
- Connected families: List: Tata family Jinnah family Bhabha family Wadia family
- Traditions: Zoroastrian

The Petit baronetcy, of Petit Hall on the Island of Bombay, is a title in the Baronetage of the United Kingdom. It was created on 1 September 1890 for the Indian entrepreneur and philanthropist Dinshaw Maneckji Petit.

The baronetcy was created with remainder to Framjee Petit, second son of the first Baronet, and the heirs male of his body, failing which to the heirs male of the body of the first Baronet. By Special Act of the Legislative Council of India, all holders of the title were to relinquish their own name upon succession and assume the name of the first Baronet.

The family is known for establishing industries, institutes, orphanages and hospitals in India.

== Petit baronets, of Petit Hall (1890) ==
- Sir Dinshaw Maneckji Petit, 1st Baronet (1823–1901)
- Sir Dinshaw Maneckji Petit, 2nd Baronet (1873–1933) — born Jejeebhoy Framjee Petit
- Sir Dinshaw Maneckji Petit, 3rd Baronet (1901–1983) — born Framjee Dinshaw Petit
- Sir Dinshaw Maneckji Petit, 4th Baronet (1934–1998) — born Naswanji Petit
- Sir Dinshaw Maneckji Petit, 5th Baronet (born 1965) — born Jehangir Petit

The heir apparent is the present baronet's only son Rehan Jehangir Petit (b. 1995)

== Extended family ==
- Bomanjee Dinshaw Petit, industrialist and the third son of 1st baronet
- Jehangir Bomanji Petit, industrialist and the son of Bomanjee and grandson of 1st baronet
- Mithuben Petit, activist and the granddaughter of 1st baronet
- Sylla Tata, wife of the 3rd baronet. She was the daughter of Ratanji Dadabhoy Tata and Suzanne Brière.
- Rattanbai Petit, daughter of the 2nd Baronet. She was married to Muhammad Ali Jinnah, the founder of Pakistan.
- Dina Wadia, daughter of Muhammad Ali Jinnah and Rattanbai Petit. She was married to Bombay Dyeing chairman Neville Wadia.
- Homi J. Bhabha, nuclear scientist and the son of Meherbai Framji Panday (granddaughter of 1st baronet)

Baronetage of the United Kingdom
Preceded by Acland baronets	Petit baronets of Petit Hall; 1 September 1890	Succeeded by Robinson baronets
