= Tata family =

Indian business family

Tata Family
- Business family
- Current region: Mumbai, Maharashtra, India
- Origin: Navsari, Gujarat, India
- Members: Jamsetji Tata; Sir Dorabji Tata; Sir Ratan Tata; Naval Tata; Ratanji Dadabhoy Tata; JRD Tata; Ratan Naval Tata; Simone Tata; Noel Tata
- Connected families: Petit family Saklatwala family Bhabha family Mistry family
- Heirlooms: Tata Sons

The Tata family is an Indian business family, based in Mumbai, India. The family company is Tata Sons, which is the main holding company of the Tata Group. About 66% of the stock in these companies is owned by various Tata family charitable trusts collectively called Tata Trusts, mainly the Sir Ratan Tata Trust & Allied Trusts, and the Sir Dorabji Tata Trust & Allied Trusts. Approximately 18% of the shares are held by the Pallonji Mistry family, and the rest by various Tata sons.

The Tatas are a Parsi family and originally came to Mumbai from Navsari in the state of Gujarat. The founder of the family's fortune was Jamsetji Tata.

== Prominent members ==
- Jamsetji Tata (3 March 1839 – 19 May 1904), known as one of the fathers of Indian industries. He and his wife Hirabai née Daboo were the parents of a daughter and two sons, being:
  - Dhunbai Tata, daughter of Jamsetji and Hirabai Tata. Unwed.
  - Sir Dorabji Tata (27 August 1859 – 3 June 1932), elder son of Jamsetji, Indian industrialist, philanthropist and 2nd Chairman of Tata Group. His wife, Meherbai Tata, was the maternal aunt of nuclear scientist Homi J. Bhabha. The couple did not have children.
  - Sir Ratan Tata (20 January 1871 – 5 September 1918), younger son of Jamsetji, philanthropist and pioneer of poverty studies. The couple did not have children. After Ratanji Tata died, his wife, Navajbai Tata, adopted an orphan, Naval, who was the grand-nephew of her mother-in-law, and raised him as her own son. Incidentally, Naval was a Tata by birth, since he was born into a very distant branch of the same broader Tata family to which Jamsetji belonged.
    - Naval Tata (30 August 1904 – 5 May 1989) adopted son of Navajbai Tata. His biological maternal grandmother, Cooverbai Rao née Daboo, had been the sister of Hirabai Tata née Daboo, wife of Tata Group founder Jamsetji Tata. Cooverbai Rao's daughter, Ratanbai née Rao, had married Hormusji Tata, who belonged to a distant branch of the broader Tata family. Their son Naval therefore carried the surname "Tata" by birthright. Following the early death of Hormusji, that family had fallen into poverty, and Ratanbai had briefly placed Naval in a Parsi orphanage. When the childless Navajbai Tata discovered that her husband's relatives were living in such poverty, she hastened to help them. She then became fond of the child Naval and, with Ratanbai's consent, she adopted him. Naval Tata served as Director in several Tata companies, was a member of the ILO, and a recipient of Padma Bhushan. He married twice and had three sons.
      - Soonoo née Commissariat, first wife of Naval Tata. Born into a Parsi family, she married Naval Tata with the approval of both his families (birth and adoptive). She bore Naval two sons, Ratan and the reclusive Jimmy, but the marriage was intensely unhappy and ended in divorce. The fact that none of her children ever married is attributed to the unhappiness they witnessed as children. As early as 1951, she married Jamsetji Jeejeebhoy, 6th Baronet.
        - Ratan Naval Tata (28 December 1937 – 9 October 2024), 5th Chairman of the Tata Group, son of Naval Tata by his first wife Soonoo Commissariat.
        - Jimmy Tata, son of Naval Tata by his first wife Soonoo Commissariat.
      - Simone Tata née Dunoyer (2 March 1930 – 5 December 2025), second wife of Naval Tata. A French-speaking Swiss woman and a Catholic, she was twenty-six years younger than Naval Tata. She married him in 1955 and moved to Mumbai. She and Naval have one son, Noel Tata (b. 1957). She ran Lakmé Cosmetics and served as chairperson of Trent (Westside).
        - Noel Tata, chairperson of Trent, son of Naval Tata by his second wife Simone.
- Ratanji Dadabhoy Tata (1856–1926), one of the early stalwarts to serve the Tata Group. His father Dadabhoy Kawasji Tata was the brother of Jeevanbai, Jamsetji Tata's mother. Therefore Ratanji was a maternal cousin of Jamsetji and belonged to the broader Tata family. He married Suzanne Brière, a French Catholic, and had five children, including:
  - JRD Tata (29 July 1904 – 29 November 1993), son of Ratanji Dadabhoy Tata by his wife Suzanne. As 4th Chairman of Tata Group, he pioneered Indian aviation and founded Tata Airlines (later known as Air India).
  - Sylla Tata, daughter of Ratanji Dadabhoy and elder sister of J.R.D. She was married to businessman Sir Dinshaw Maneckji, the 3rd baronet. Her daughter Rattanbai was wife to Muhammad Ali Jinnah, the founder of Pakistan.

== See also ==
- Jindal family
