= Suzanne RD Tata =

First woman in India to drive a car (1880–1923)

- Born: Suzanne Brière; 1880; Paris, France
- Died: 1923 (aged 42–43); London, England
- Spouse: Ratanji Dadabhoy Tata
- Children: 5 (including Jehangir)
- Family: See Tata family

Suzanne Ratanji Dadabhoy "Sooni" Tata (née Brière, 1880–1923), was the French wife of Indian businessman Ratanji Dadabhoy Tata. She is known for being the first woman in India to drive a car, in 1905.

== Life and background ==
She was born in Paris. She married businessman Ratanji Dadabhoy Tata, chairman of the Tata Group, a member of the Tata family, soon after he began to learn French, and they were married in Paris in 1902. At the time of her marriage, she converted to Zoroastrianism from Christianity and began to be known as Sooni, or Soona.

The couple had five children Sylla, Jehangir, Rodabeh, Dorab, and Jamshed (Informally called Jimmy). Her second son Jehangir, better known as JRD Tata, took over his father's business and was the first man in India to get a pilot license, and both her daughter's were the first women to get a pilot license in India. Her daughter Sylla was married to businessman Sir Dinshaw Maneckji, the 3rd baronet, and Rodabeh was married to Leslie Sawhny.

Brière made her first flight in an aeroplane in 1913. In the early 20th century, Tata had some difficulties in reconciling her French and Indian identities.

She died in 1923 in London at the age of 42.
