= Taj Mahal Palace Hotel =

Five-star hotel in Colaba, Mumbai, India

The Taj Mahal Palace
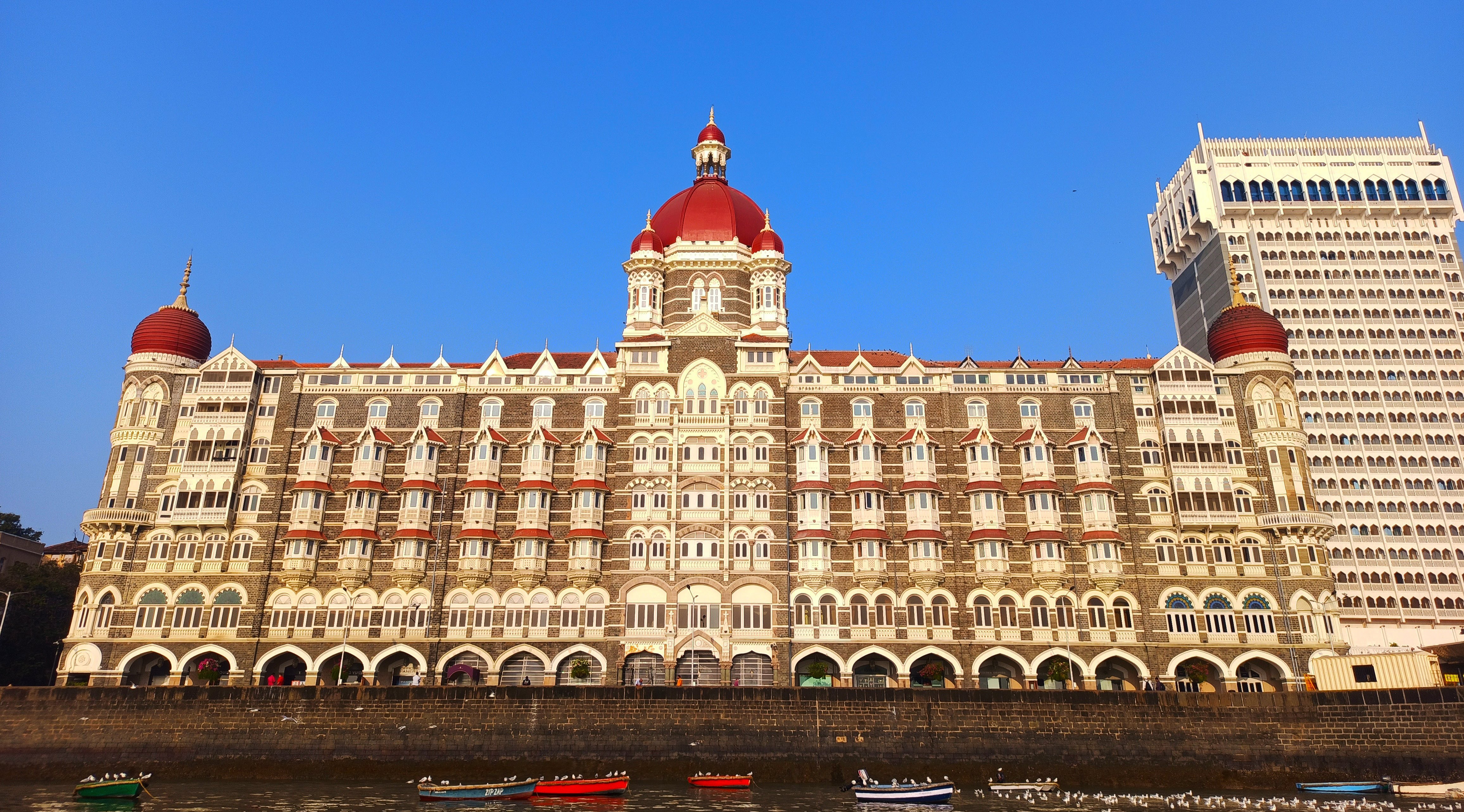
- The Taj Mahal Palace Hotel

- Location within Mumbai

General information
- Location: Mumbai, Maharashtra, India
- Coordinates: 18°55′19″N 72°50′00″E
- Opening: 16 December 1903; 122 years ago
- Owner: Taj Hotels

Technical details
- Floor count: 6 floors in The Taj Mahal Palace, 20 floors in the Taj Mahal Tower

Design and construction
- Architects: Sitaram Khanderao Vaidya, D.N. Mirza
- Main contractor: Shapoorji Pallonji Group

Other information
- Number of rooms: 600
- Number of suites: 44
- Number of restaurants: 9

Website
- Official website

The Taj Mahal Palace is a heritage, five-star, luxury hotel in the Colaba area of Mumbai, Maharashtra, India, situated next to the Gateway of India. Built in the Indo-Saracenic style, it opened in 1903 as the Taj Mahal Hotel, and has historically often been known simply as "The Taj". The hotel is named after the Taj Mahal, which is located in the city of Agra, approximately 1,050 kilometres (650 mi) from Mumbai. It has been considered one of the finest hotels in the East since the time of the British Raj. It is currently owned and managed by the Indian Hotels Company Limited (IHCL), a Tata Group company. The hotel was one of the main targets in the 2008 Mumbai attacks.

Part of the Taj Hotels, the hotel has 560 or 600 rooms and 44 suites and is considered the flagship property of the group; it employs 1,500 staff. The hotel is made up of two different structures: the Taj Mahal Palace and the Tower, which are historically and architecturally distinct from each other (the Taj Mahal Palace was built in 1903; the Tower was opened in 1972).

== History ==
=== Early years ===
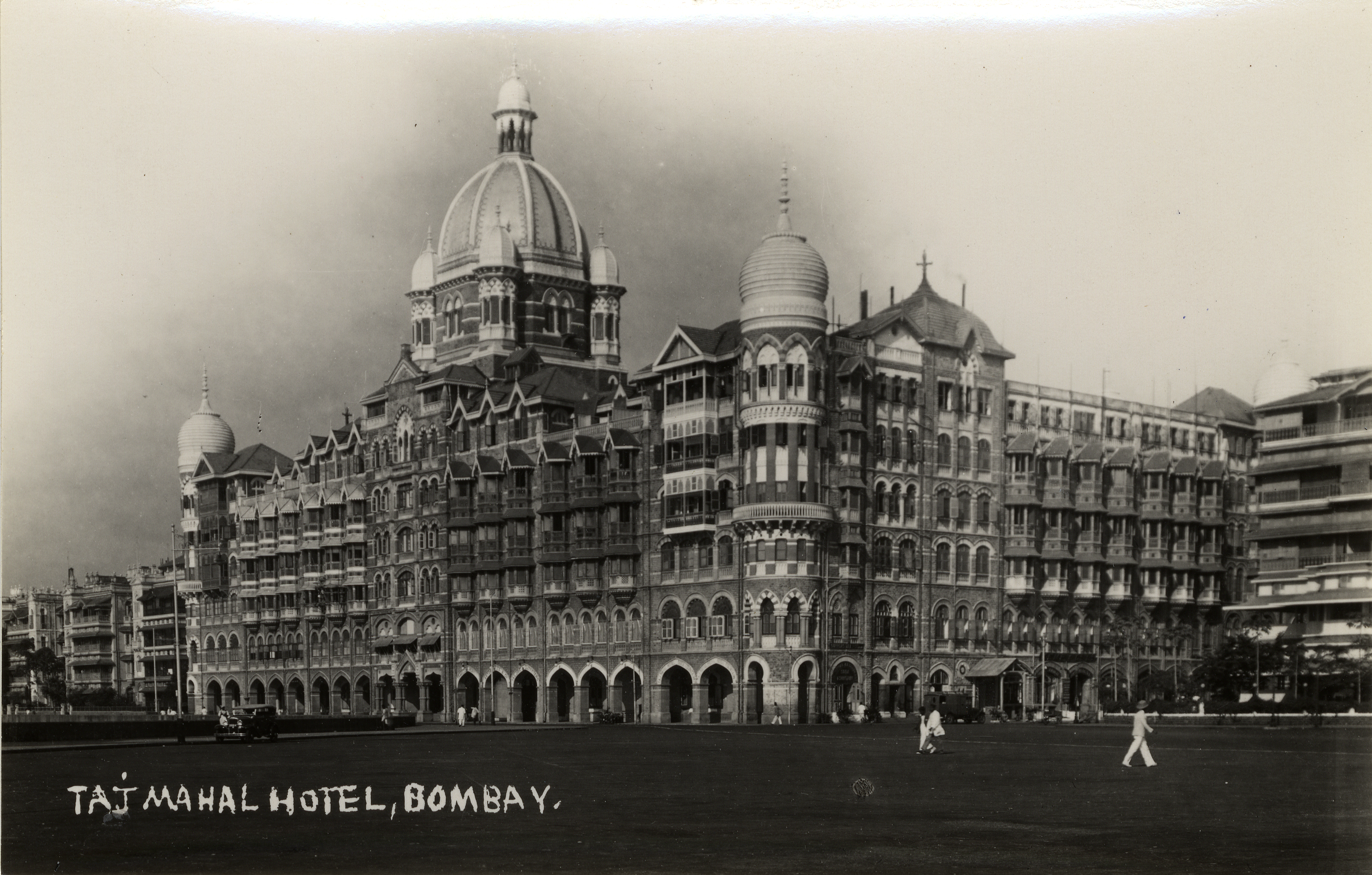
The Taj Mahal Hotel, c. 1935

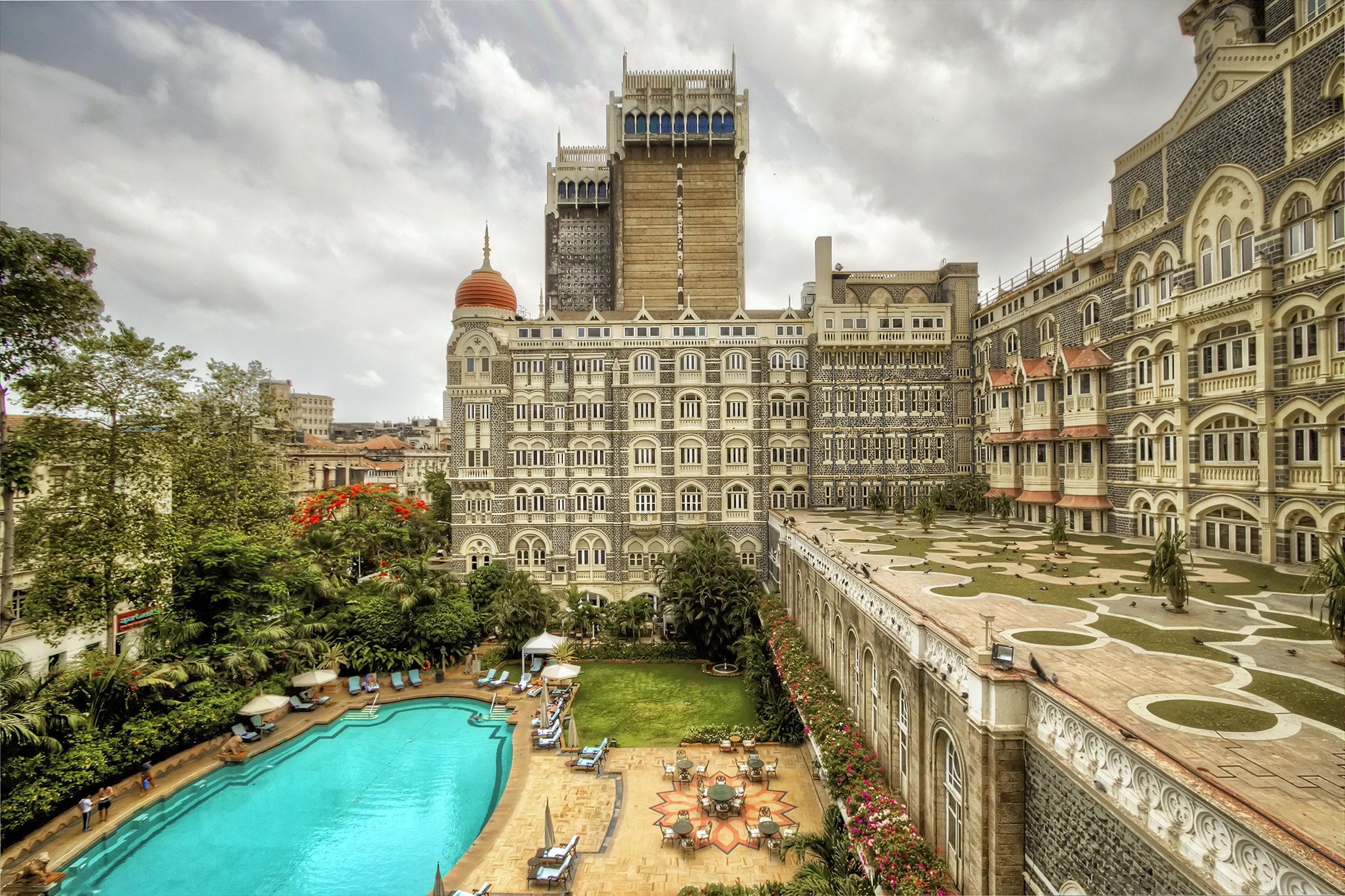
The original entrance on the west side; now the site of the hotel pool

==== Pre Independence ====
The Taj Mahal Hotel was commissioned by Jamsetji Tata and opened its doors to guests on 16 December 1903.

An oft-repeated story concerning the reasoning behind the construction of the hotel was Tata being refused admission into Watson's Hotel, as it was reserved for Europeans. The validity of this has been challenged by writer Charles Allen, who wrote that Tata was unlikely to care about such a slight to the extent that he would construct a new hotel. Instead, Allen writes, the Taj was built at the urging of the editor of The Times of India, who felt a hotel "worthy of Bombay" was needed, and as a "gift to the city he loved" by Tata.

Originally, the main entrance was on the land-facing side, where the pool now sits.

==== 1950–1970 ====
By 1966, the Taj Mahal Hotel had become neglected and run-down, perhaps as a result of losing the British customers after Indian independence. The Taj Mahal Hotel was home to legendary jazz musician Micky Correa, "The Sultan of Swing", from 1936 to 1960.

=== Expansion ===
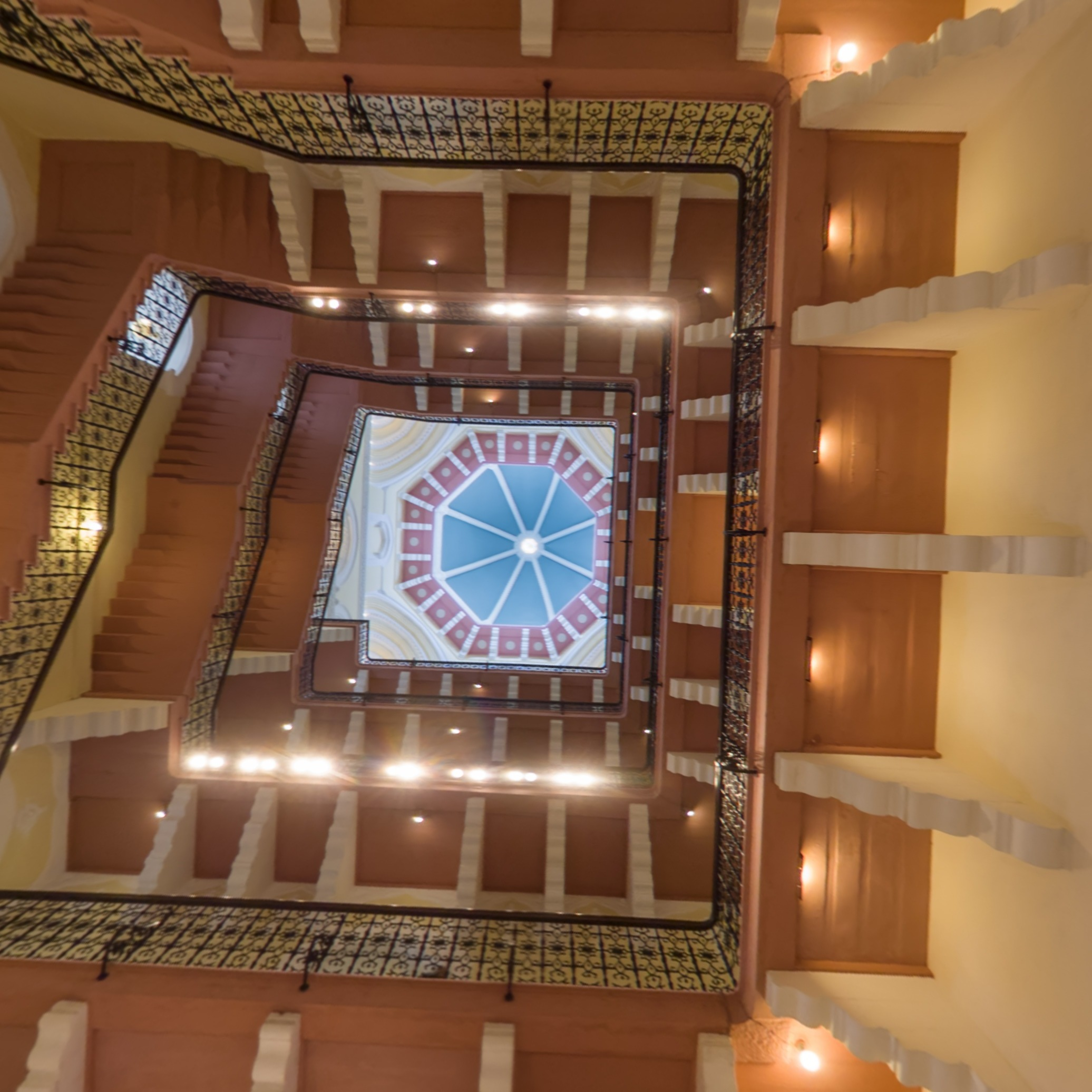
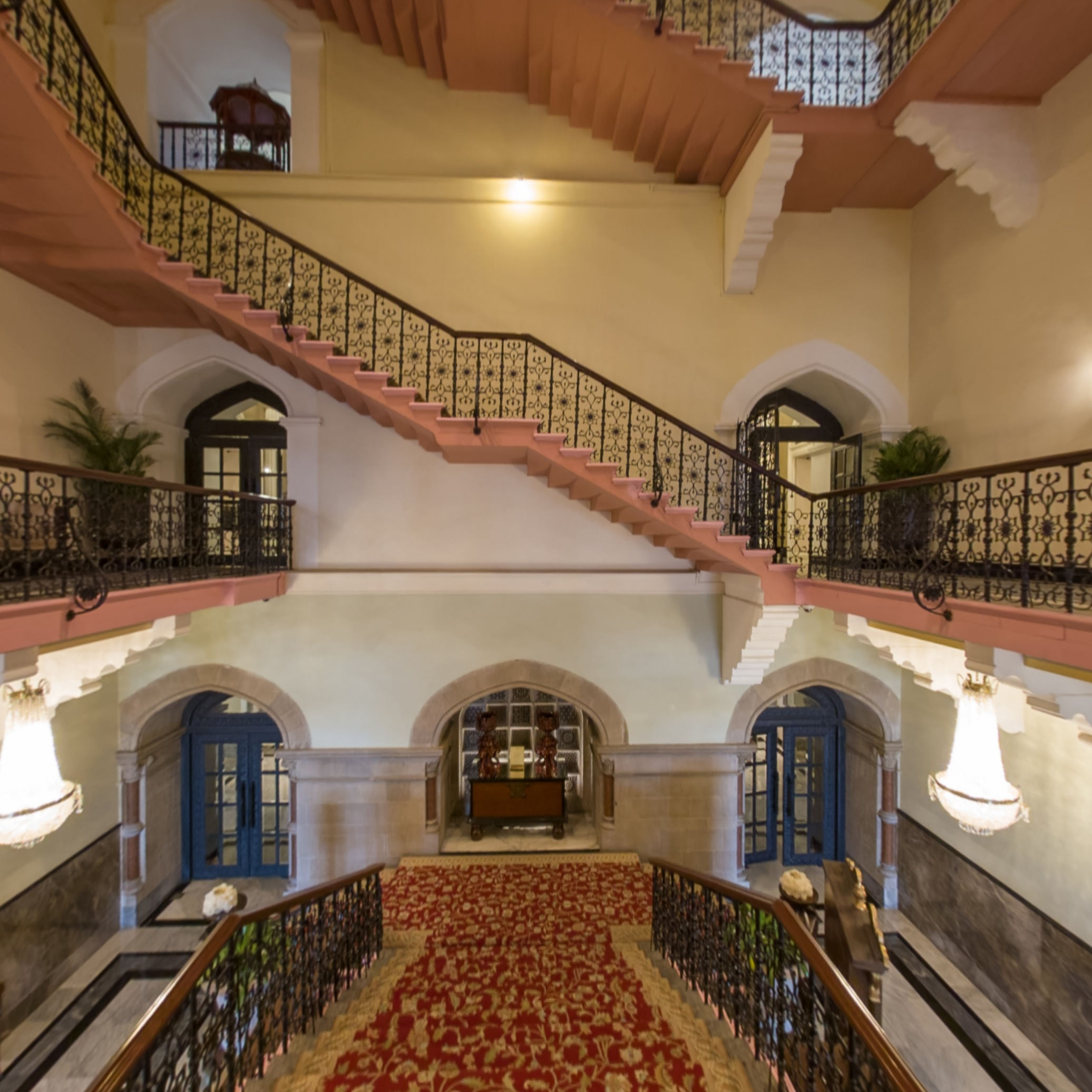
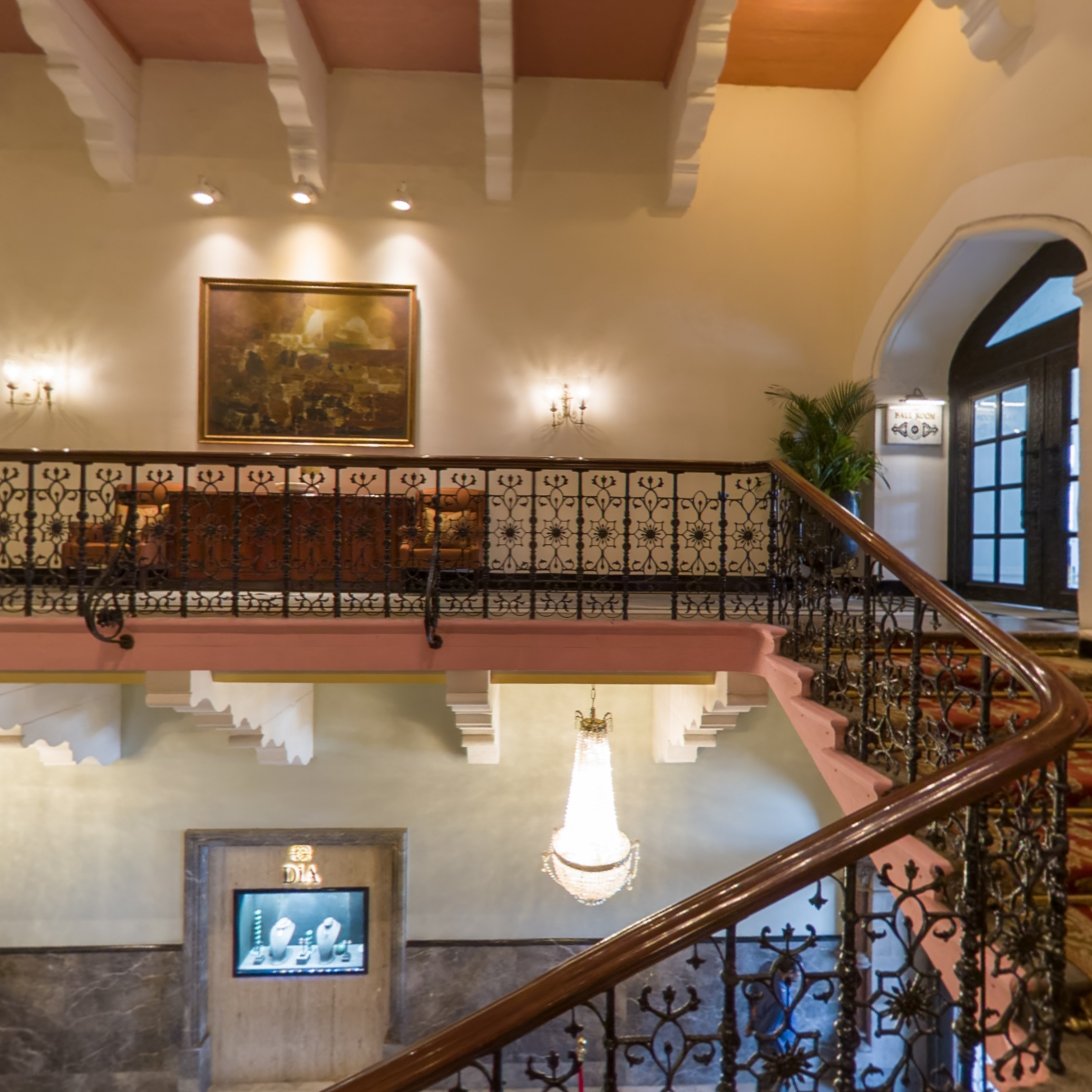
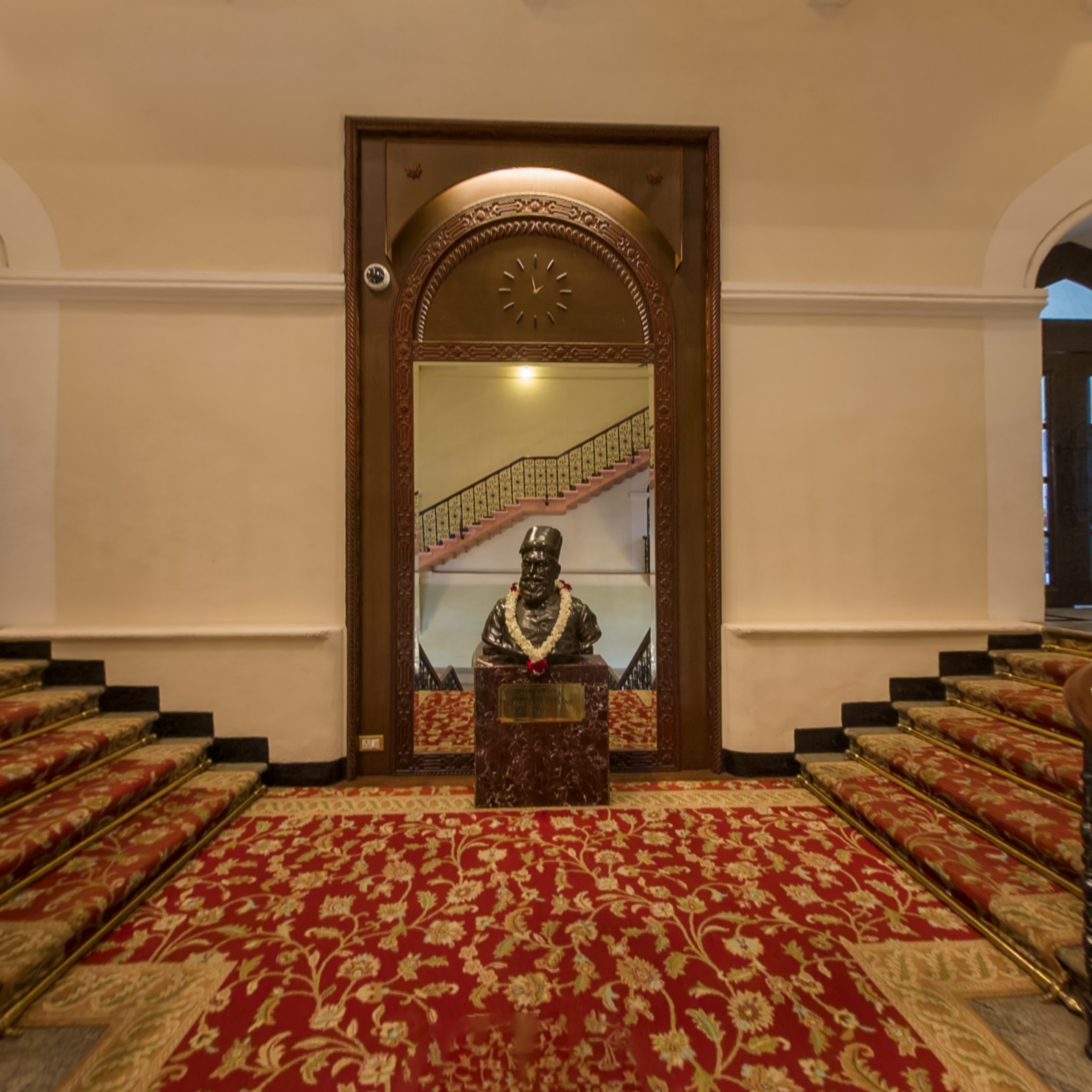
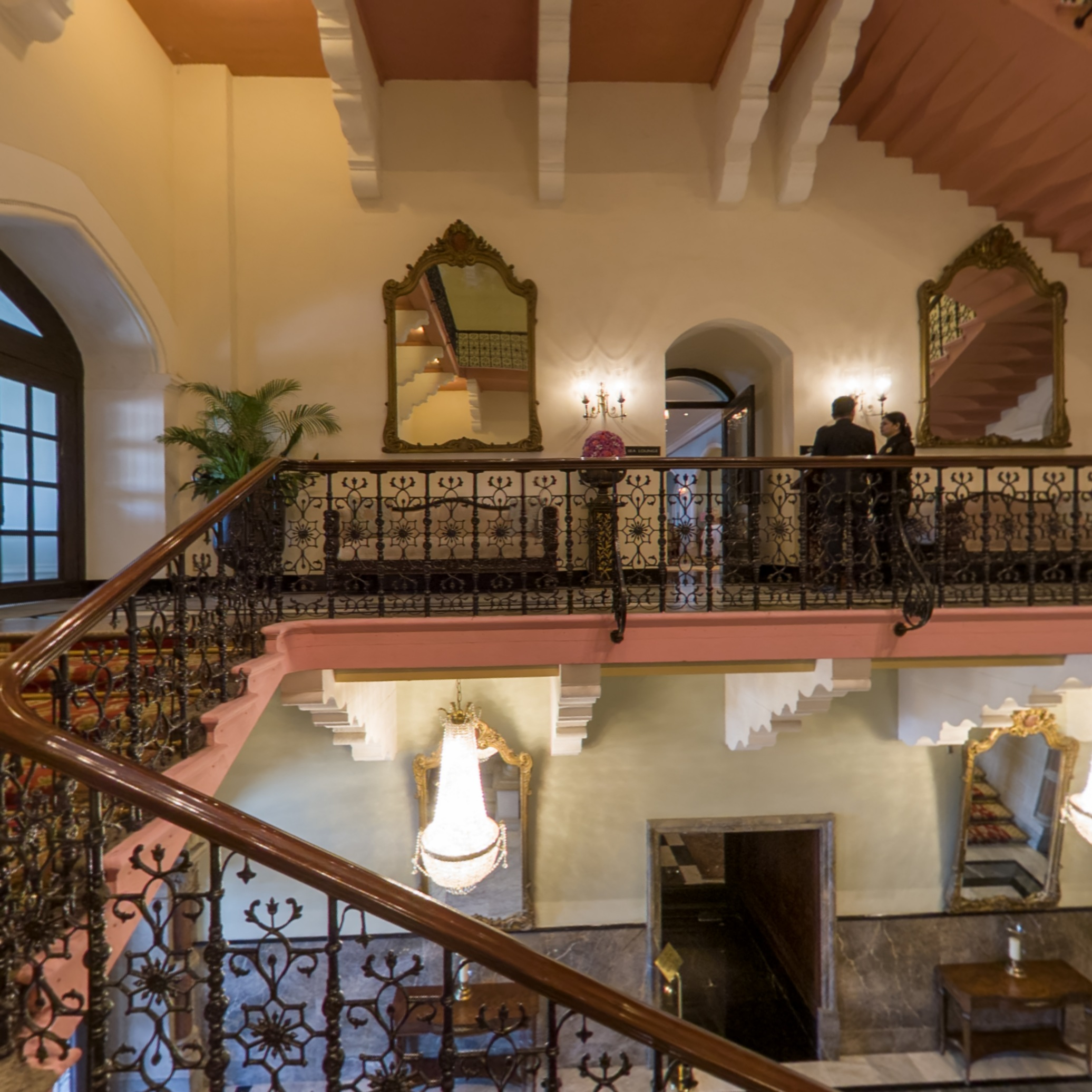
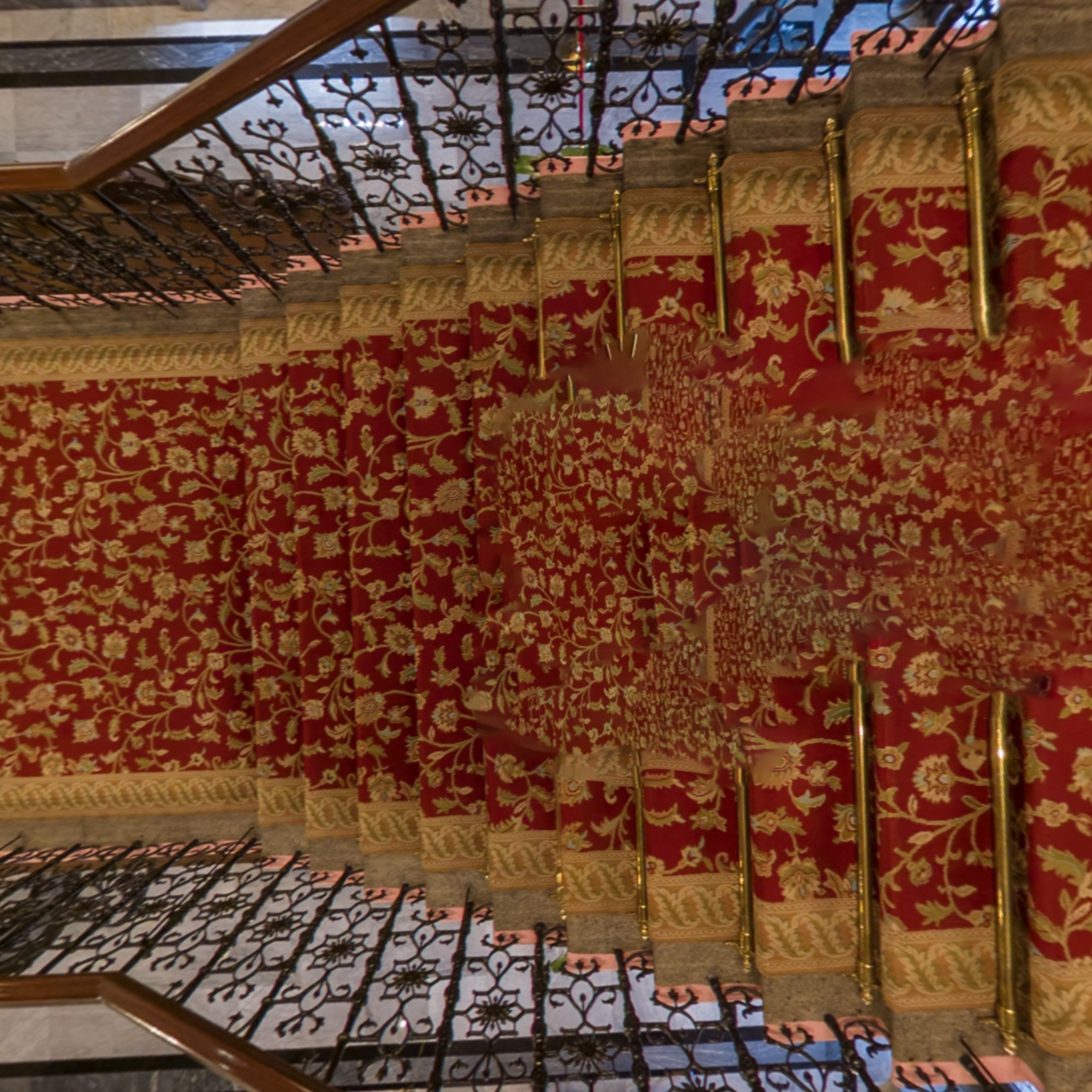
Grand staircase of the hotel

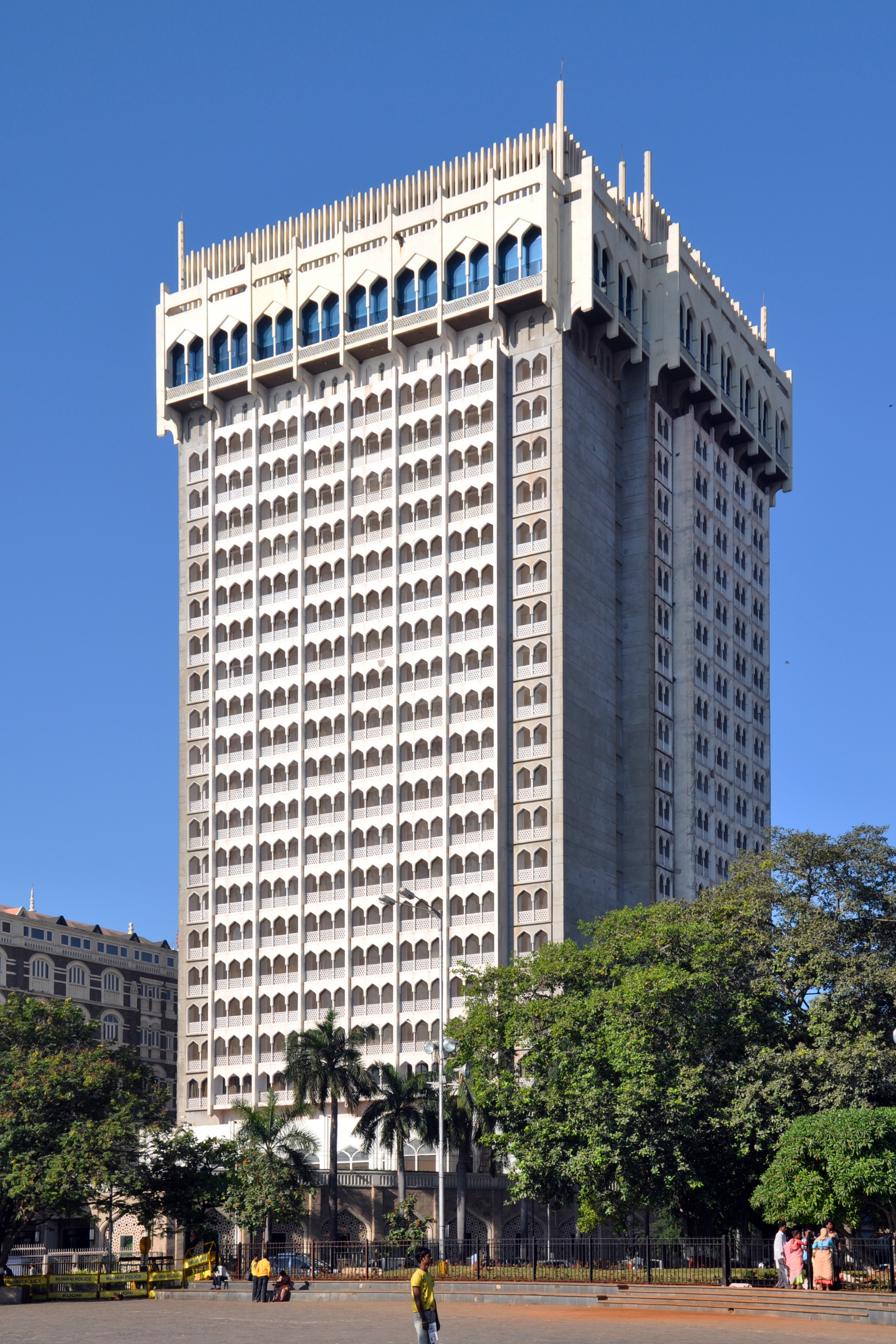
The 1972 wing, today called The Taj Mahal Tower

Management of the Taj Mahal Hotel was franchised to Pan Am's Inter-Continental Hotels division from 1972 to 1995, and it was renamed The Taj Mahal Inter-Continental, with the new tower wing opening that same year.

Known today as The Taj Mahal Tower, it was designed jointly by Daraius Batliwala and Rustom Patell, with the latter having a greater focus later on. The Tower was built on the site of the historic Green's Hotel, constructed as flats in 1890, and operated by Tata as a hotel from 1904 until its demolition to build the Tower.

In 2003, in honour of the hotel's centennial, it was renamed The Taj Mahal Palace & Tower.

=== 2008 Mumbai attacks ===
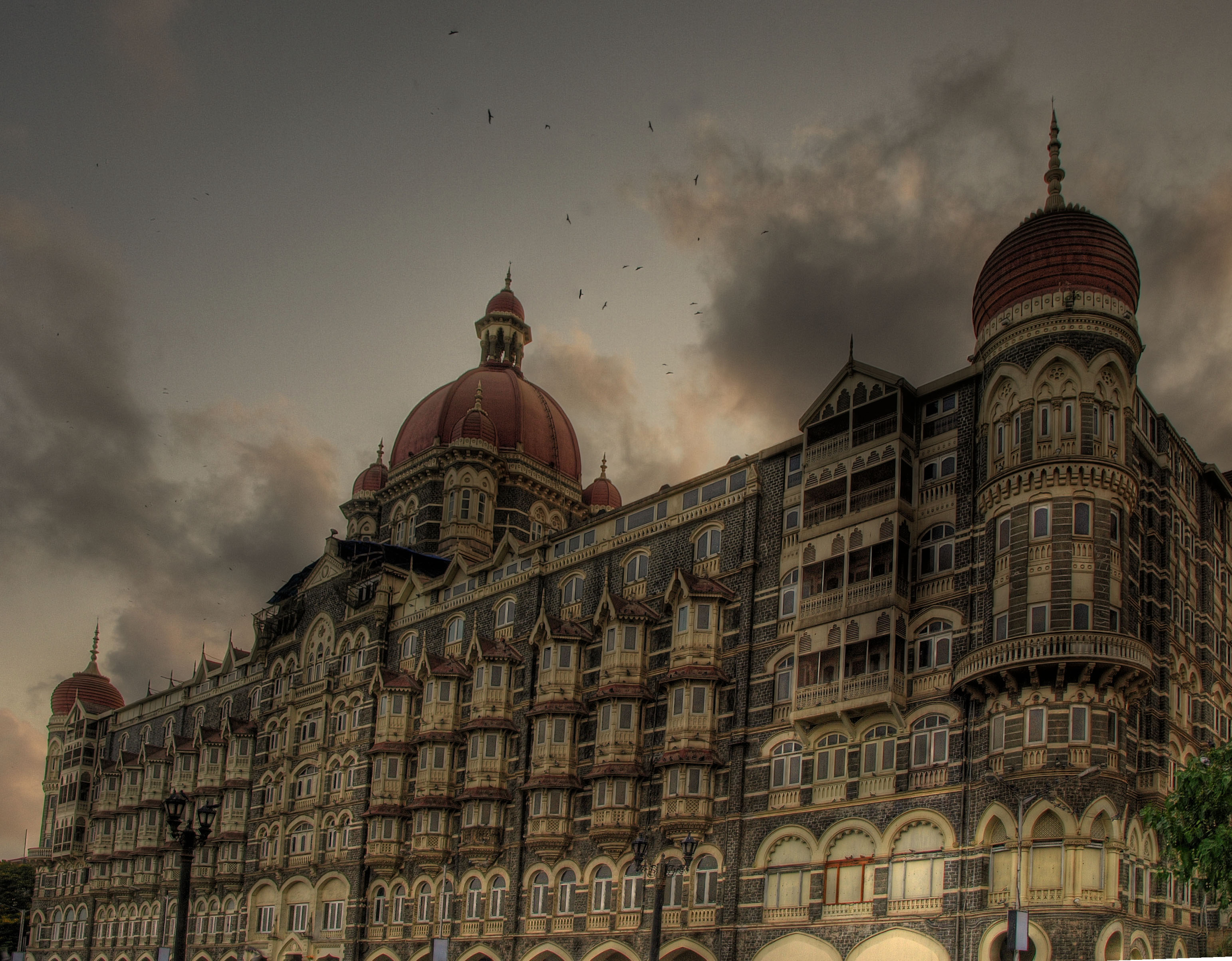
A view of hotel with smoke during the attack

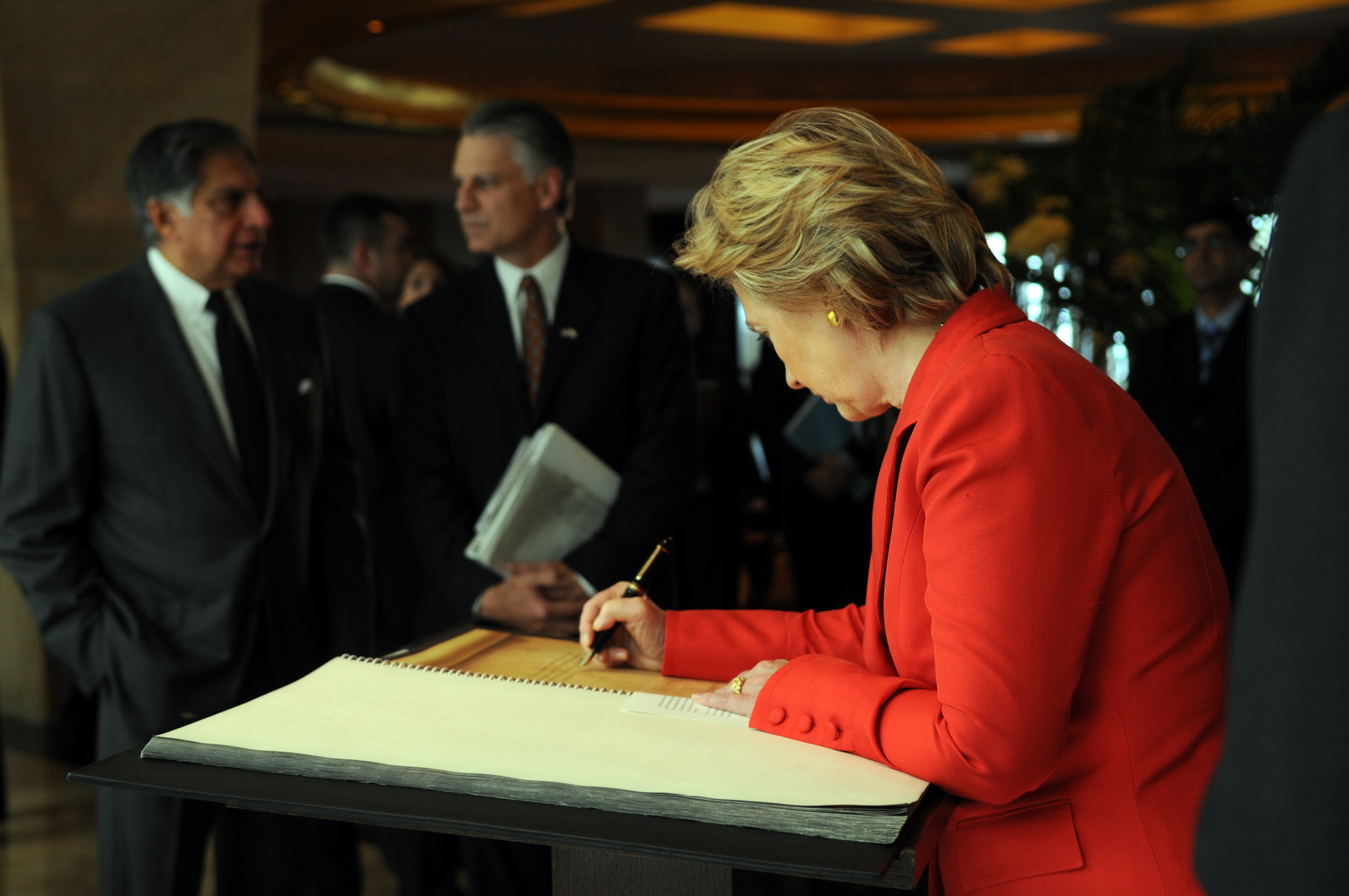
U.S. Secretary Hillary Clinton at the Taj Mahal Palace Hotel in July 2009

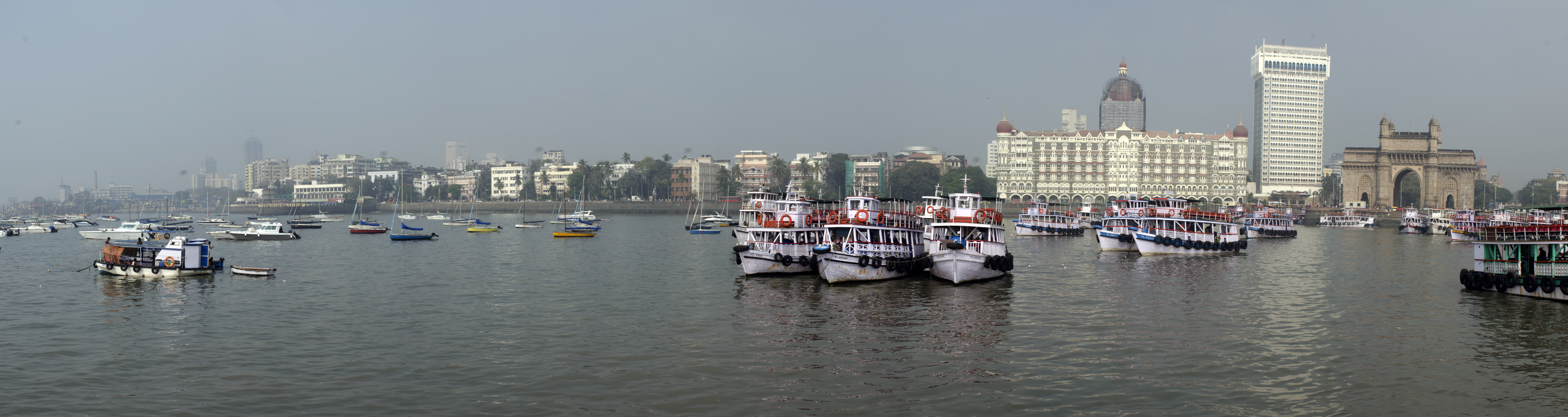
Gateway of India, Taj Mahal Palace Hotel and Mumbai skyline from Elephanta Island ferry

Taj Mahal Palace Hotel was specifically chosen by Lashkar-e-Taiba, a terror group who attacked multiple targets, for an attack intended to strike "a blow against a symbol of Indian wealth and progress". The hotel was attacked on 26 November 2008, during which material damage occurred, including the destruction of the hotel's roof in the hours following. Hostages were taken during the attacks, and at least 167 people were killed, including many foreigners. The casualties were mostly Indian citizens, although westerners carrying foreign passports were singled out. Indian commandos killed the terrorists barricaded in the hotel, to end the three-day battle on 29 November. At least 31 died at the Taj. Approximately 450 people were staying in the Taj Mahal Palace and Hotel at the time of the siege. The attack was planned using information compiled by David Headley, a Pakistani-American, who had stayed at the hotel multiple times.

Soon after this on 30 November, Tata chairman Ratan Tata said in an interview with CNN's Fareed Zakaria that they had received advance warning of the attacks and that some countermeasures had been taken. These may have been relaxed before the attack, but in any case were easily sidestepped by the operatives.

The less-damaged sections of the Taj Mahal Palace and Tower hotel reopened on 21 December 2008. It took several months to rebuild the popular heritage section of the Taj Mahal Palace Hotel.

In March 2010, as restoration work neared completion, the hotel dropped the word "Tower" from its name and became The Taj Mahal Palace.

=== Recent history ===
In 2017, the Taj Mahal Palace Hotel acquired an image trademark, the first building in the country to secure intellectual-property-right protection for its architectural design.

== In media ==
- The hotel is the primary setting of the novel Night in Bombay (1940) by the American novelist Louis Bromfield.
- It has also been mentioned in the short story "Sahab Bahadur" by Indian writer Sultan Rashed Mirza, Farhat Ullah Baaaig, and in the novel Delinquent Chacha by Ved Mehta.
- It was portrayed as a dream destination for a schoolboy to visit in the Marathi movie Taryanche Bait.
- Michael Palin spent the night in the hotel in episode 4 of Around the World in 80 Days with Michael Palin.
- The hotel is the setting for the 2015 film Taj Mahal.
- The hotel is the setting for the 2018 film Hotel Mumbai about the attacks, starring Dev Patel and Armie Hammer.
- Hotel Grand Palace is another name for Hotel Taj Mahal. This name has been used by people as a translation of the Hindi version of Taj Mahal, especially by authors. Such authors as Jeffrey Archer have used this term in their novels.
- The hotel was the subject of a four-part BBC Two fly on the wall documentary series starting in August 2014, called Hotel India.
- The hotel was a shooting location for Christopher Nolan's film Tenet, released in August 2020.
- Warren, William; Gocher, Jill (2007). Asia's Legendary Hotels: The Romance of Travel. Singapore: Periplus Editions. ISBN 978-0-7946-0174-4.

== Gallery ==
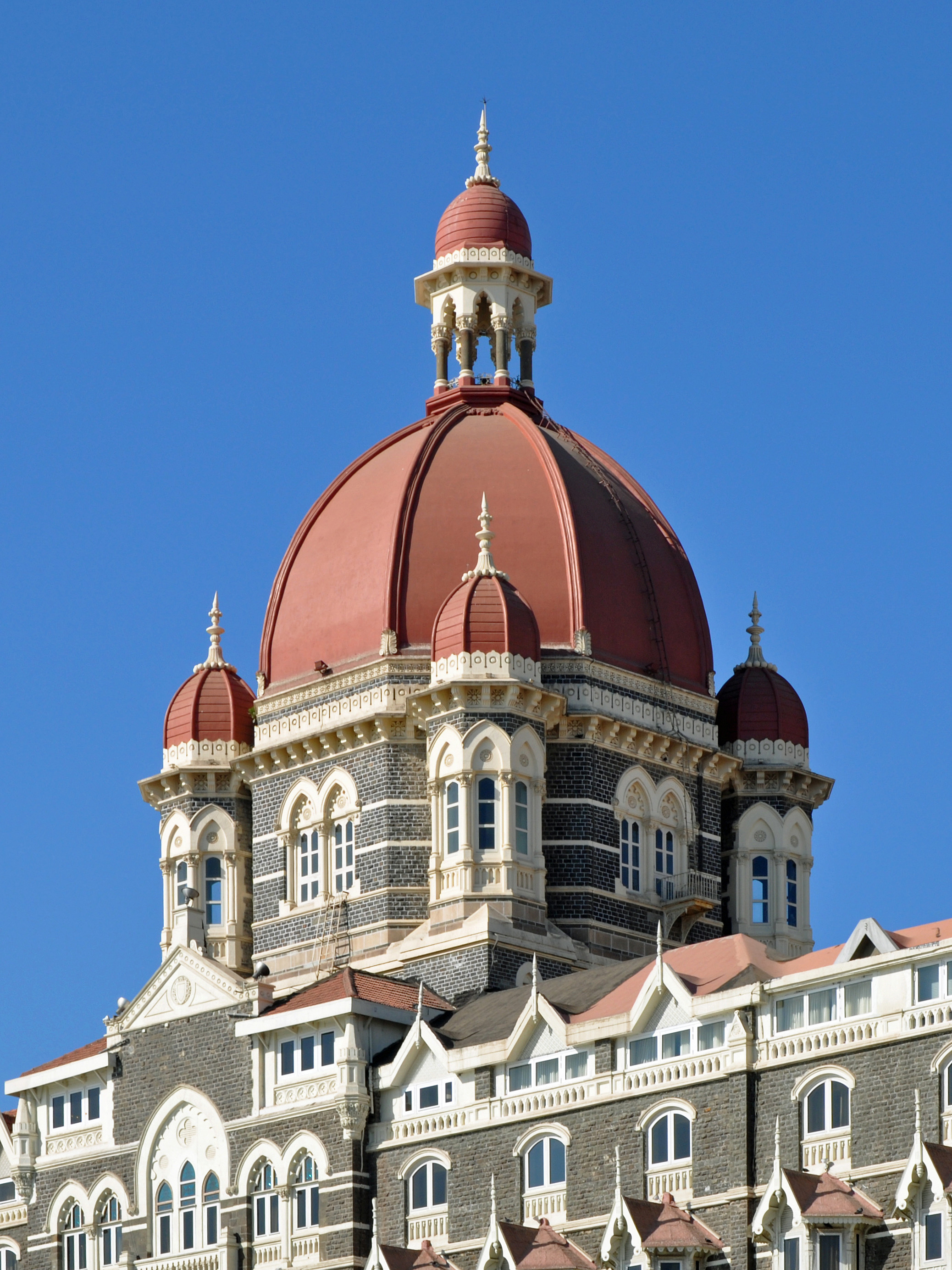
The dome of the hotel's old wing

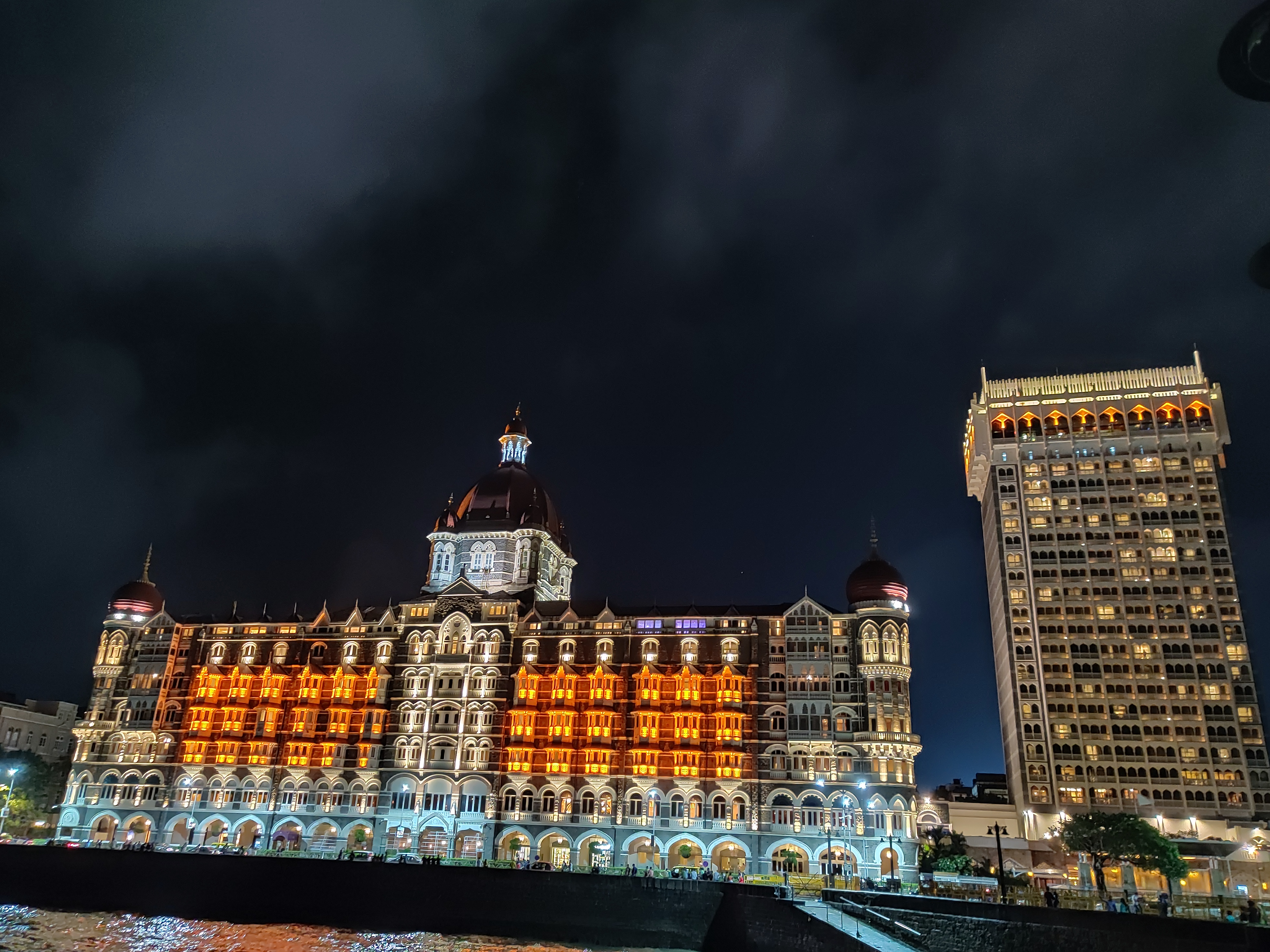
An evening view of the hotel

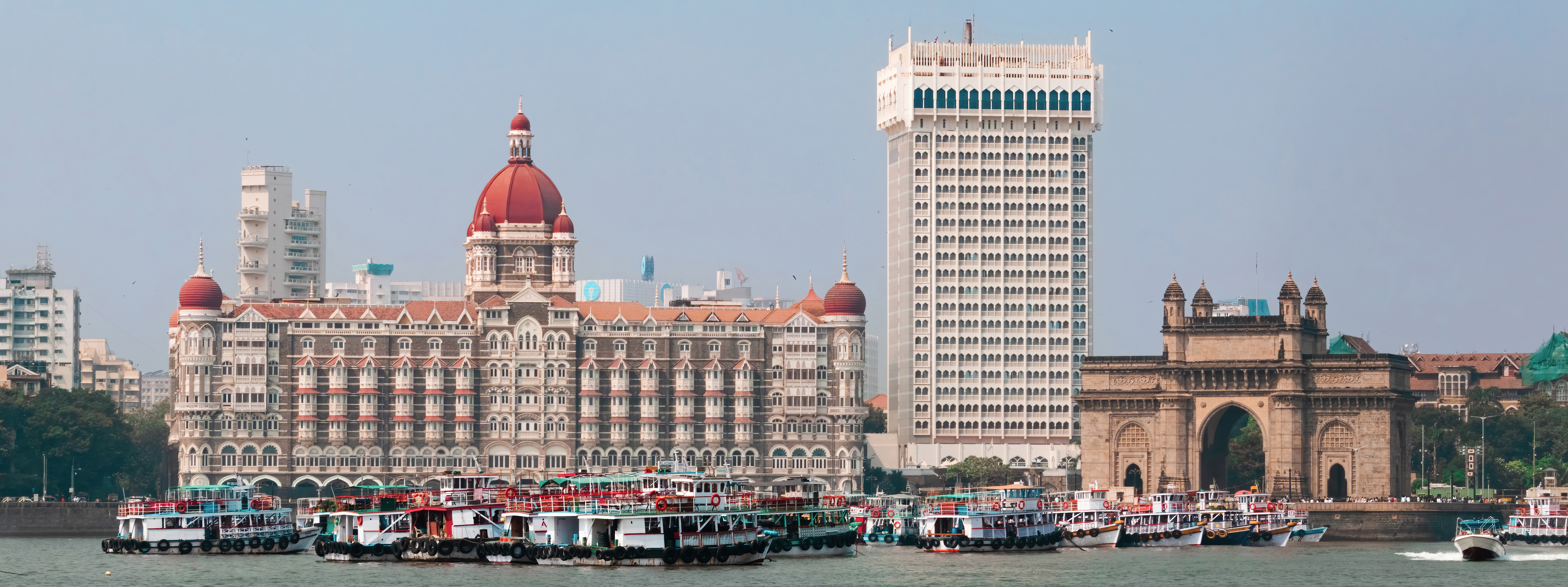
A view of the hotel with the Gateway of India, as seen from the Arabian Sea

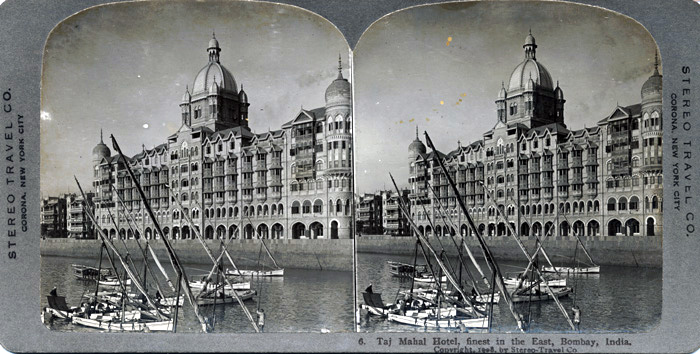
The hotel, on a postcard, 1908

== See also ==
- Leopold Cafe
- Chhatrapati Shivaji Terminus
- Oberoi Trident
