= Ratanji Dadabhoy Tata =

Indian businessman (1856–1926)

- Born: 1856; Navsari, Bombay Presidency, British India
- Died: 1926 (aged 69–70); Paris, France
- Education: Cathedral and John Connon School
- Occupation: Industrialist
- Spouse: Suzanne Brière
- Children: 5, including J. R. D. Tata
- Relatives: see Tata family

Ratanji Dadabhoy Tata (1856–1926) was an Indian businessman who played a pivotal role in the growth of the Tata Group in India. He was the first-cousin of Jamsetji Tata and one of the partners in Tata Sons, founded by Jamsetji Tata. Ratanji was the father of JRD Tata, who went on to become the fourth chairman of the Tata Group.

== Personal life ==
Ratanji was born in Navsari in the Bombay Presidency in 1856 to Dadabhoy Kawasji Tata and Bhikhibai Tata. Dadabhoy was the son of Kawasji Maneckji Tata and grandson of Maneckji Tata. They were all members of the extended Tata family. Dadabhoy's sister, Jeevanbai, was married to Nusserwanji Ratanji Tata (a distant relative). Their son was Jamsetji Tata.

Ratanji studied at the Cathedral and John Connon School and Elphinstone College in Bombay. After graduating, he took up a course in agriculture in Madras. He then joined his family trade in the East Asia.

Ratanji was married to a Parsee woman at a young age. However, she died childless not long after the marriage. Ratanji was in his forties when he married a French woman, Suzanne Brière, in 1902. This was considered revolutionary in his times and was not welcomed by many in the Parsi community. They had five children: Rodabeh, Jehangir, Jimmy, Sylla and Dorab.

== Opium trade ==
Under the name Tata & Co, Ratanji ran an opium importing business in China, which was illegal at the time while consumption was prohibited but enforcement was weak. In 1887, he and other merchants such as David Solomon Sassoon presented a petition on behalf of the opium traders to complain about a Hong Kong Legislative Council bill that threatened to affect their trade.

== Director of Tata Steel ==
Tata Steel was conceived and commissioned by Jamsetji Tata. However, Jamsetji died before the completion of the project. Ratanji played an important role in the completion of the project along with Jamsetji's son Dorab and thus Tata Steel was established in Jamshedpur.

The Tatas supplied steel to the British during the First World War. However, after the war Tata Steel went through a difficult period in the 1920s as steel was dumped in India by Britain and Belgium. Ratanji, along with other directors successfully sought protection for the Indian steel industry from the colonial government of the day and steadied the operations of Tata Steel.
