= Naval Tata =

Indian industrialist and philanthropist (1904–1989)

Naval Hormusji Tata
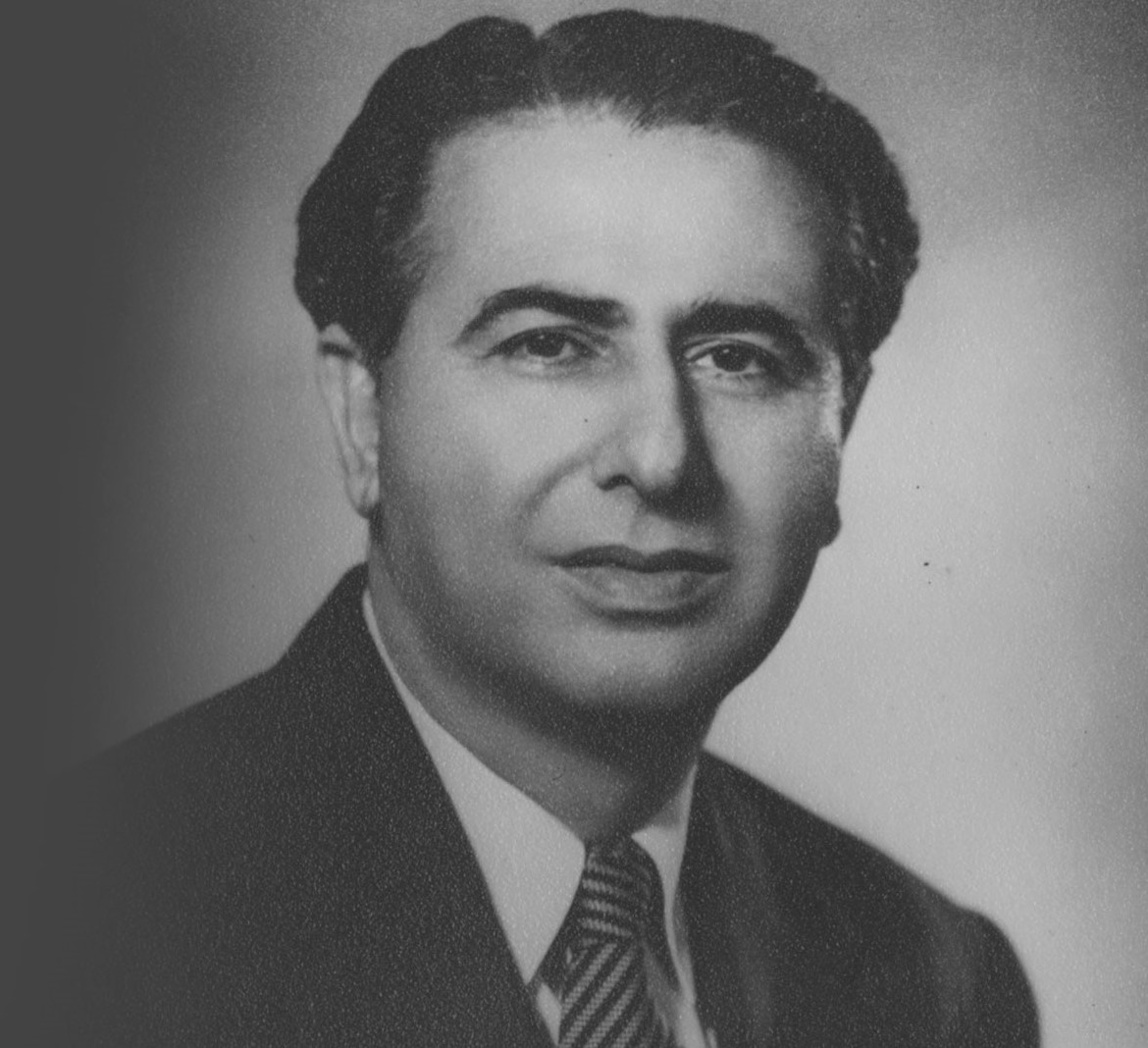
- Born: 30 August 1904; Surat, Bombay Presidency, British India
- Died: 5 May 1989 (aged 84); Bombay, Maharashtra, India
- Occupations: Industrialist, Philanthropist
- Spouse(s): Sooni Commissariat (separated) Simone Dunoyer (m. 1955)
- Children: 3, including Ratan and Noel
- Parent: Ratanji Tata (adoptive father)
- Relatives: See Tata family

Naval Hormusji Tata (30 August 1904 – 5 May 1989) was an Indian industrialist and philanthropist who worked for the Tata Group. He was the adopted son of Sir Ratanji Tata, and the father of Ratan, Jimmy and Noel Tata.

== Early life ==
Naval was born in Surat on 30 August 1904 to a middle-class Parsi family. His father, Hormusji Tata, belonged to a distant branch of the extended Tata family. Hormusji's grandfather, Navroji Tata, was the second-cousin of Jamsetji Tata. Both of them are descended from Bhika Tata. Thus, he was a Tata by birth. His mother was Ratanbai née Rao, daughter of Cooverbai Rao née Daboo, the sister of Hirabai Tata née Daboo, wife of Tata group founder Jamsetji Tata.

Hormusji was a spinning master in the Advanced Mills at Ahmedabad and died in 1908 when Naval was only four years old. After Naval's father died, his mother relocated to Navsari, where she struggled to earn for the family. Ratanbai's income was derived from embroidery work. Naval lived at the J. N. Petit Parsi Orphanage to make it easier to raise him.

Navajbai, wife of Sir Ratanji Tata, adopted him from the orphanage at the age of 13. Ratanji Tata was his maternal uncle because Naval's maternal grandmother and Ratanji's mother were sisters.

Naval later graduated from Bombay University in Economics and proceeded to London for a short course in Accounting.

He never forgot his past and once remarked:

"I am grateful to God for giving me an opportunity to experience the pangs of poverty, which more than anything (else) moulded my character in later years of my life."

== Family ==
Naval's first wife was Sooni Commissariat; they had two sons, Ratan and Jimmy Tata. Both sons never married or had children. The couple separated in the mid-1940s.

Naval later married Simone Dunoyer, a businesswoman from Switzerland, they got married in 1955. Noel Tata is their son.

== Career ==
=== Tata Group ===
In 1930, he joined the Tata Sons as a despatch clerk-cum-assistant secretary and soon rose to be the Assistant Secretary of Tata Sons Ltd. In 1933, he became the Secretary to the Aviation Department and five years later, he joined as an executive in the Textiles Department. In 1939 he became the Joint Managing Director of the Tata Mills — the controlling company of the textile mills run by Tatas and became its managing director in 1947. On 1 February 1941, he became a Director of Tata Sons. He took over as the managing director of Tata Oil Mills Co Ltd in 1948. He was also the chairman of the Ahmedabad Advance Mills, a Tata Group company based at Ahmedabad.

Over the years he became chairman of the other textile mills and the three electric companies. From an active director he later became the Deputy Chairman of Tata Sons. He was directly responsible for the management of the three Tata electric companies, the four textile mills and the Sir Ratan Tata Trust. He was the longest serving colleague and close associate of JRD Tata on board of Tata Sons.

=== Other companies ===
He also served as a director of Bank of Baroda with Tulsidas Kilachand, Rameshwar Das Birla, Arvind Mafatlal and others.

=== Other activities ===
Naval Tata went on to become an internationally recognised authority in labour relations, becoming a member of the International Labour Organization's governing body in 1949. His involvement with the International Labour Organisation for over three decades was very fruitful for India. Naval holds the record of being elected to the governing body of the International Labour Organization thirteen times. He was founder of ILO's family planning programme. He is author of reports like — In Pursuit of Industrial Harmony: An Employer's Perspective by Naval H. Tata (1976), A Policy for Harmonious Industrial Relations (1980), On Wage Problem and Industrial Unrest by Naval H. Tata, C. V. Pavaskar, B. N. Srikrishna (1982).

In 1966, he had been appointed a member of the Labour Panel of the Planning Commission set up by the Union Government.

He contributed to sports, was associated with a host of other activities, and held senior offices in social, educational and welfare work. He was President of Indian Hockey Federation for fifteen years and was at helm when Indian hockey team won Olympic Gold in 1948, 1952 and 1956.

He served many other institutes like the Indian Institute of Science, the Bombay State Social Welfare Council, Swadeshi League, and the National Safety Council.

As a philanthropist, the Indian Cancer Society was established in 1951 by Naval Tata and Dr. D. J. Jussawalla, which is India's first voluntary, non-profit, national organisation for awareness, detection, cure and survivorship of those affected with this disease. He served as Chairman of the Indian Cancer Society for over 30 years.

He was also the President of the Auxiliary Forces Welfare Association and trustee of several philanthropic trusts.

He was President of the Employers Federation of India for several years. Having been associated with the organisation for four decades, on his retirement as its president, he was made its "President Emeritus".

== Politics ==
He differed in opinion with his cousin and long standing colleague, JRD Tata. While JRD wanted to steer clear of politics, Naval stood as an independent candidate from South Bombay in 1971 but lost elections.

== Awards ==
Naval was awarded the Padma Bhushan by the President of India on Republic Day, 1969. The same year he was given recognition for his role in industrial peace and awarded the Sir Jehangir Ghandy Medal. He was conferred the life membership of the National Institute of Personnel Management.

== Death ==
He died on 5 May 1989 due to cancer in Bombay.

== Memorials ==
- Indian Institute of Social Welfare and Business Management has named the Sports Management Department as The Naval Tata Centre of Excellence in Sports Management in his memory.
- Naval Tata Memorial Lecture is organised by National Institute of Personnel Management every year in his memory since 1992.
- In 2004, the Tata group organised 'The Century of Trust' exhibition in various cities jointly in memory of Jamsetji Tata, JRD Tata and Naval Tata.
- Employers' Federation of India launched the 'Naval Tata Institute for Training in Industrial Relations' in 2014 as a memorial to him.
- In 1999 a book in his memory Naval Tata remembered was published containing compilation of letters, writings, speeches of Naval.
- In 2019, Government of Odisha, Tata Steel & Tata Trusts (Hockey Ace foundation) launched Hockey HPC in Bhubaneswar, Odisha. It was named as Odisha Naval Tata Hockey High Performance Centre to pay tribute to Naval Tata for his significant contribution in development of Hockey in India.
