= Tata Trusts =

Indian group of trusts owned by the Tata family

- Founded: 1892
- Founder: Jamsetji Tata
- Type: Non profit organisation
- Location: Mumbai, Maharashtra, India
- Chairman: Noel Tata
- Website: https://www.tatatrusts.org

Tata Trusts is a group of 15 charitable trusts in India established by various members of the Tata family. The most prominent of these are the Sir Ratan Tata Trust and the Sir Dorabji Tata Trust. The trusts are involved in philanthropy in the areas of healthcare, education, livelihoods, nutrition, rural development, water, research, and social innovation. Over the years, they have set up some of the most reputed institutions in these areas in India and abroad.

The first trust was set up by Jamsetji Nusserwanji Tata in 1892 as the JN Tata Endowment to help Indians pursue higher education abroad. The JN Tata Endowment was the first of the many philanthropic initiatives, forming the basis of today's Tata Trust.

Following the tradition and example of service set by their father Jamshetji, his two sons, Dorabji Tata (1859–1932) and Ratanji Tata (1871–1918) established two Trusts that form two of the biggest entities in the Allied Tata Trusts.

The Tata Trusts collectively hold a 66% stake in Tata Sons, which is the principal investment holding company and promoter of the Tata Group, a $180 billion conglomerate with interests in industries including technology, iron and steel, power, chemicals, automobiles, hotels, retail, consumer products, telecommunications, and airlines.

== Major milestones ==
- 1892 — Jamsetji Tata establishes the JN Tata Endowment.. Based on merit, the JN Tata Endowment supports higher studies overseas.
- 1919 — Sir Ratan Tata Trust (SRTT) is established as per the will of Sir Ratanji Tata, who passed away in 1918, at the age of 48, leaving behind his wealth for the betterment of the society. He wrote in this will that if he dies without children, he will give the rest of his property to charitable causes.
- 1932 — Sir Dorabji Tata Trust was established as a non-communal and multipurpose charitable trusts. Sir Dorabji Tata passed away without an heir and donated all of his wealth including a 40% share in Tata Sons to Sir Dorabji Tata Trust, which was to be formed after his death in 1932.
- 1974–1990 — expansion into additional public trusts
- 2000s onward — shift toward strategic philanthropy and institutional implementation model

== Charitable Focus ==
The Tata Trusts support a wide range of causes, and operate with both grantmaking as well as direct implementation models, often acting as both funder and operator. They collaborate with governments, NGOs, academic institutions, and social enterprises to scale impactful programs and foster long-term development.

== List of entities constituting Tata Trusts ==
1. Sir Dorabji Tata Trust and Allied Trusts
  - Sir Dorabji Tata Trust
  - Lady Tata Memorial Trust
  - JRD Tata Trust
  - Jamsetji Tata Trust
  - Tata Social Welfare Trust
  - JN Tata Endowment
  - Tata Education Trust
  - RD Tata Trust
  - The JRD and Thelma J Tata Trust
  - Lady Meherbai D. Tata Education Trust
1. Sir Ratan Tata Trust and Allied Trusts
  - Sir Ratan Tata Trust
  - Tata Education and Development Trust
  - Navajbai Ratan Tata Trust
  - Bai Hirabai J. N. Tata Navsari Charitable Institution
  - Sarvajanik Seva Trust

== Notable institutions created by Tata Trusts ==
- Indian Institute of Science (IISc), was established in 1909. Inspired by JN Tata’s vision, IISc was established on the 27 May 1909 in Bangalore following a vesting order and resolution passed by the government of India to establish the Institute. The Royal Family of Mysore provided land and additional funds and IISc formally opened its door to 24 students in 1911.
- Sir Ratan Tata Industrial Institute, established in 1928. The Institute was founded by Navajbai Tata, wife of Ratanji Tata with a mission to offer Parsi women a way to earn a living from their cooking, stitching and embroidery.
- Tata Institute of Social Sciences (TISS), established in 1936. It was set up by Sir Dorabji Tata Trust to create a framework for trained professionals to tackle India's vast social, economic and industrial problems including poverty and labor welfare. The Mumbai campus was inaugurated in 1954 by then PM Jawaharlal Nehru.
- Tata Memorial Centre (TMC), established in 1966 by amalgamating Tata Memorial Hospital and Indian Cancer Research Centre. Tata Memorial Hospital was initially set up by the Trustees of Sir Dorabjee Tata Trust in the year 1940 for offering treatment and cure of cancer and allied diseases. After independence, the Government of India entered into an agreement with Sir Dorabjee Tata Trust on 7 October 1953, to set up a laboratory - Indian Cancer Research Centre. Subsequently, an agreement was executed between the Government of India and the Trustees of Sir Dorabjee Tata Trust on 6 January 1966, under which Tata Memorial Hospital and Indian Cancer Research Centre were amalgamated into an institution named as Tata Memorial Centre (TMC).
- Tata Institute of Fundamental Research (TIFR), established in 1945.
- National Centre for the Performing Arts (NCPA), established in 1966.
- National Institute of Advanced Studies (NIAS), established in 1988.
- Sir Dorabji Tata Centre for Research in Tropical Diseases, established in 1999. The center was established within the Indian Institute of Science (IISc) and it closed down in 2013. It's functional infrastructure, lab equipment, and scientific focus were integrated to newly created Centre for Infectious Diseases Research (CIDR) at the IISc.
- Tata Center for Technology and Design at MIT, established in 2012.
- Tata Centre for Development at UChicago, established in 2016.
- Assam Cancer Care Foundation was set up in December 2017 as a joint partnership between the Government of Assam and Tata Trusts to create a first-of-its-kind, three-level cancer grid in the state. The distributed care model was designed to create patient-centric cancer institutions which deliver standardised and affordable care closer to patients' homes.
- Tata Institute for Genetics and Society, established in 2017, is a non-profit research institute that aspires to develop scientific, evidence-based solutions to prevent infectious diseases, improve access to affordable and quality diagnostics and therapeutics for rare genetic disorders, foster health equity, and achieve nutrition security through sustainable models for agriculture.
- Harvard University South Asia Institute
