= R. K. Krishna Kumar =

Indian businessman (1938–2023)

- Born: Rayaroth Kuttambally Krishna Kumar; 18 July 1938; Tellicherry, Madras Presidency, British India
- Died: 1 January 2023 (aged 84); Mumbai, Maharashtra, India
- Other name: KK
- Education: Loyola College, Chennai; Presidency College, Chennai
- Occupation: Business executive
- Known for: Tata Sons
- Spouse: Ratna
- Children: 1
- Awards: Padma Shri (2009)

Rayaroth Kuttambally Krishna Kumar (18 July 1938 – 1 January 2023) was an Indian business executive who was the director of Tata Sons. He was a member of Tata Administrative Services and served as a trustee of Sir Dorabji Tata Trust and Sir Ratan Tata Trust, which hold a 66 per cent stake in Tata Sons. He played a significant role in several acquisitions by Tata Group, including the £271 million buy-out of Tetley in 2000, which made Tata Global Beverages the second-largest tea company in the world. The Government of India awarded him the fourth-highest civilian honour of the Padma Shri in 2009 for his contributions to Indian trade and industry.

== Early life ==
Krishna Kumar was born in Thalassery, in the south Indian state of Kerala, to Sukumaran and Sarojini, and did his schooling at Madras Christian College Higher Secondary School in Chennai, where his father served as the police commissioner. His graduate studies were at Loyola College, Chennai, after which he secured his master's degree from the Presidency College, Chennai, of the University of Madras with first rank.

== Career ==
Kumar started his career by joining Tata Administrative Services in 1963 and was posted at Tata Industries where he worked for two years. In 1965, he was transferred to Tata Global Beverages, then known as Tata Finlay, and worked through the re-branding of the company as Tata Tea, to become the vice-president of South India Plantations in 1982. He was promoted to joint managing director of the company in 1988 and, three years later, he became the sole managing director. In 1997, as the head of the division, he moved to Indian Hotels Company, the hospitality division of Tata Group which includes Taj Hotels Resorts and Palaces. Under Kumar's leadership, Tata Tea formed a joint venture with Tetley, UK, in 1992 and, later, acquired the British company on a £271 million buy-out to become the second largest tea business in the world, reportedly the largest overseas take-over by an Indian firm at that time.

Kumar headed the Indian Hotels Company from 1997 to 2002, until his appointment to Tata Sons, the holding company of the group, as a member of the board of directors. A year later, he retired from the board and went back to Indian Hotels Company as its vice-chairman and managing director, and stayed on the job until 2007, when he joined Sir Dorabji Tata Trust, one of the principal stakeholders in Tata Sons, as a trustee. In 2009, he promoted RNT Associates, a private investment company of Ratan Tata, the then-chairman of the Tata Group and the incumbent chairman emeritus of Tata Sons, to assist startups and new companies in India. He also joined Sir Ratan Tata Trust, another stakeholder of Tata Sons, as a trustee, but continued to sit on the board of directors of Tata Sons, until he retired from the board on 18 July 2013 on reaching the age of 75, the prescribed age for retiring.

Kumar's efforts were reported during the Assam Crisis of 1997, when ULFA activists held Tata Tea employees as hostages, and during the 2008 Mumbai attacks, when the Taj Mahal Palace Hotel was under siege. Even after retirement, he continued his association with Tata Group through his trusteeships at the two major stakeholders of Tata Sons, and was based at the Tata Trust office in the Elphinstone building at Horniman Circle Gardens, Mumbai. He also held the directorship of RNT Associates, along with his long-term associate, Ratan Tata. The government of India included him in the 2009 Republic Day honours list for the civilian award of the Padma Shri.

== Personal life ==
Kumar was married to Ratna and the couple had a son, Ajit. Kumar died in Mumbai on 1 January 2023.
