= Shapoorji Mistry =

Indian businessman, and founder of the Shapoorji Pallonji Group

Shapoorji Mistry was an Indian businessman, and the founder of the Shapoorji Pallonji Group. He is the father of Pallonji Mistry. Shapoorji Mistry's grandson Cyrus Mistry was the Chairman of Tata Sons. The Shapoorji Pallonji Group is one of India's leading industrial conglomerate and a major construction company.

== Early life ==
Shapoorji Mistry was born in Bombay in 1889. His son Pallonji Mistry was born in 1929 and is currently Chairman Emeritus of the Shapoorji Pallonji Group. He is a Parsi whose ancestors are believed to have migrated to Mumbai from Vesu, Gujarat (near Surat).

== Names in the family ==
Shapoorji Mistry's family follows the traditional Parsi practice of repeating first names in subsequent generations. Thus one will find many Shapoorji and Pallonji as first names repeated in the family. This article is about Shapoorji Mistry born in 1889. His father was known as Pallonji (d. 1921) and his son is known as Pallonji Mistry (b. 1929).

== Financing of Mughal-e-Azam ==
Shapoor ji had a great love and admiration for Emperor Akbar, otherwise he had no interest in film making. Upon learning that Karimuddin Asif was making a film on Akbar and the Mughals, which was earlier being financed by Shiraz Ali, his friend and business partner, who left India post partition in 1947. He had a special connection with K. Asif, and that was the sole reason for Shapoor ji to finance a movie, the legendary Hindi movie, Mughal-e-Azam. When released in 1960, this movie was the costliest Hindi movie made till then.
