= Noel Tata =

Irish businessman (born 1957)

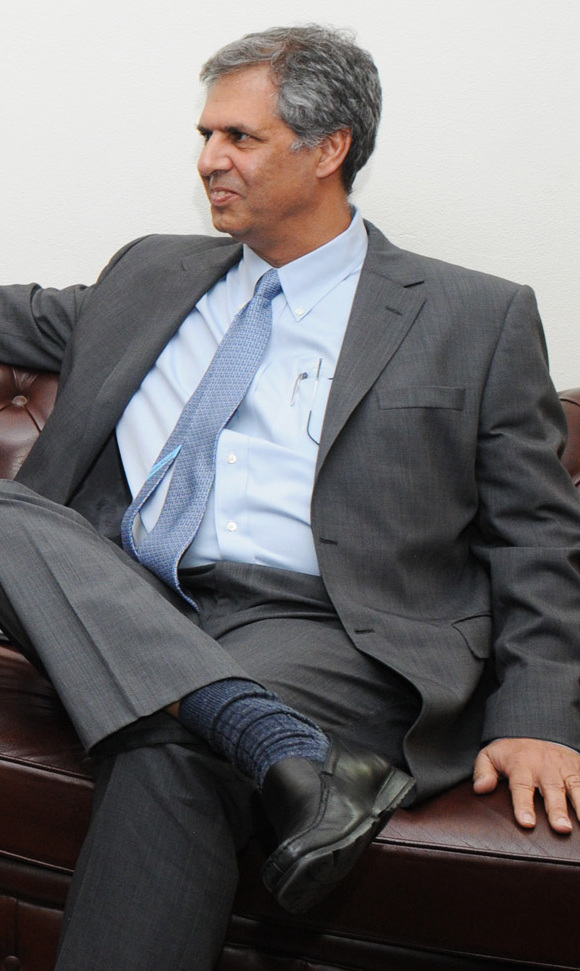
- Tata in 2013
- Born: Noel Naval Tata; 1957 (age 68–69); Bombay, India
- Citizenship: Ireland
- Education: University of Sussex, INSEAD
- Occupation: Businessman
- Title: Chairman of Tata Trusts
- Spouse: Aloo Mistry
- Children: 3
- Parent(s): Naval Tata; Simone Tata
- Relatives: Pallonji Mistry (father-in-law); Ratan Tata (half-brother)

Noel Naval Tata (born 1957) is an Indian-born Irish businessman of Parsi and Swiss descent. He is the chairman of the Tata Trusts, Trent and Tata Investment Corporation, the managing director of Tata International, and the vice chairman of Titan Company and Tata Steel.

On 11 October 2024, following the death of his half-brother Ratan Tata, Noel Tata was appointed chairman of the Tata Trusts that holds a 66% stake in Tata Sons, the parent company of the Tata Group that holds the bulk of shares of the Group.

== Early life ==
Part of the Tata family, he is the son of Naval Tata and Simone Tata. He was born in Mumbai, India, in 1957. He is the half-brother of Ratan Tata, the ex-chairman of the Tata Group, and Jimmy Tata.

Tata earned a bachelor's degree from the University of Sussex, and attended the International Executive Programme at INSEAD business school in France.

== Career ==
He began his career at Tata International, the Tata Group's arm for products and services offered abroad. In June 1999, he became the managing director of the Group's retail arm Trent, which was founded by his mother. By this time, Trent had acquired the department store Littlewoods International and changed its name to Westside. Tata developed Westside, turning it into a profitable venture. In 2003, he was appointed the director of Titan Industries and of Voltas.

In 2010, it was announced that Tata was to become managing director of Tata International, the company dealing with the overseas business of the $70 billion conglomerate, raising speculation that he was being groomed to succeed Ratan Tata as head of the Tata Group. However, in 2011, his brother-in-law Cyrus Mistry was announced as Ratan Tata's successor . In October 2016, Mistry was removed as the chairman of Tata Sons and Ratan Tata took over as the chairman of the group for four months until February 2017. Noel Tata was made vice chairman of Titan Company in 2018, and in February 2019 was inducted onto the board of the Sir Ratan Tata Trust. On 29 March 2022, he was appointed vice chairman of Tata Steel.

== Personal life and family ==
He is married to Aloo Mistry, the daughter of Pallonji Mistry, who was the single largest shareholder in Tata Sons (the Tata Group's holding company). They have three children, Leah, Maya and Neville.

Their elder daughter, Leah, earned a Master's degree in Marketing from IE Business School in Madrid and is a vice-president at the Indian Hotels Company Limited, a Tata hospitality arm. Their second daughter, Maya, started her education at Bayes Business School in London and Warwick University, worked as an analyst at Tata Capital, and is a board member of the Tata Medical Center Trust. Their son, Neville, also an alumnus of Bayes Business School and an MBA graduate from INSEAD, began his career with Trent Limited, the main retail arm of Tata, and later led Zudio operations, before heading the Star Bazaar. Noel is an Irish citizen.
