= Pallonji Mistry =

Indian-born Irish businessman (1929–2022)

Pallonji Shapoorji Mistry
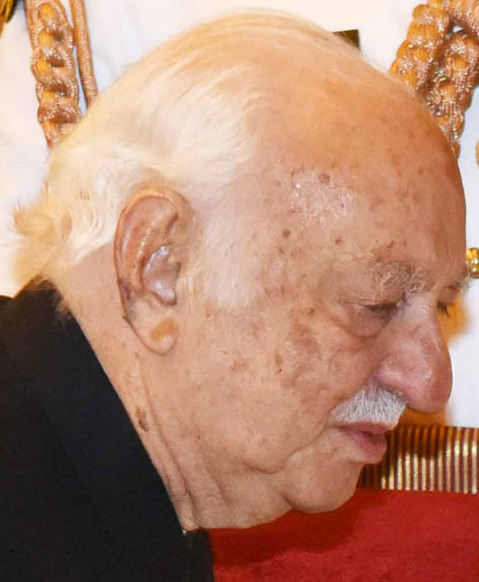
- Mistry in 2016
- Born: 1 June 1929; Bombay, Bombay Presidency, British India
- Died: 28 June 2022 (aged 93); Mumbai, Maharashtra, India
- Citizenship: Ireland
- Occupation: Businessman
- Known for: 17.3% stake in Tata Sons
- Title: Chairman, Shapoorji Pallonji Group
- Spouse: Patsy Perin Dubash
- Children: 4, including Cyrus
- Relatives: Noel Tata (son-in-law)

Pallonji Shapoorji Mistry (1 June 1929 – 28 June 2022) was an Indian-born Irish businessman. He was chairman of the Shapoorji Pallonji Group and a major shareholder of India's largest private conglomerate, Tata Group.

== Early life ==
Pallonji Mistry was born to Shapoorji Mistry in Bombay (now Mumbai) on 1 June 1929. He was a member of Parsi community in Bombay.

The Mistrys own a substantial construction company, Shapoorji Pallonji. Shapoorji, the group patriarch and Pallonji's father, built some of Mumbai's landmarks around the Fort area – the Hong Kong & Shanghai Bank, the Grindlays Bank, the Standard Chartered Bank, the State Bank of India and the Reserve Bank of India buildings.

== Career ==
His father first bought shares in Tata Sons in the 1930s, a stake that as of 2011 stood at 18.4%, making Mistry the largest individual shareholder in Tata Sons, which is primarily controlled by the Tata philanthropic Allied Trusts, and the largest individual shareholder in India's largest private conglomerate, Tata Group, the primary shareholder being the charitable Tata Trusts.

Pallonji Mistry was the chairman of the Shapoorji Pallonji Group, through which he owned Shapoorji Pallonji Construction Limited, Forbes Textiles and Eureka Forbes Limited. He was the former chairman of Associated Cement Companies.

His son, Cyrus, was chairman of Tata Sons from November 2011 to October 2016. Within the Tata Group, he is known as the Phantom of Bombay House for the quiet but assured way he commanded power around the Mumbai headquarters of the Tata empire.

According to Bloomberg Billionaires Index, Pallonji Mistry's wealth was estimated to be about US$30 Billion in mid-2021. and US$29 billion at the time of his death. He was the richest Irish billionaire at the time of his death, and the world's 143 richest person.

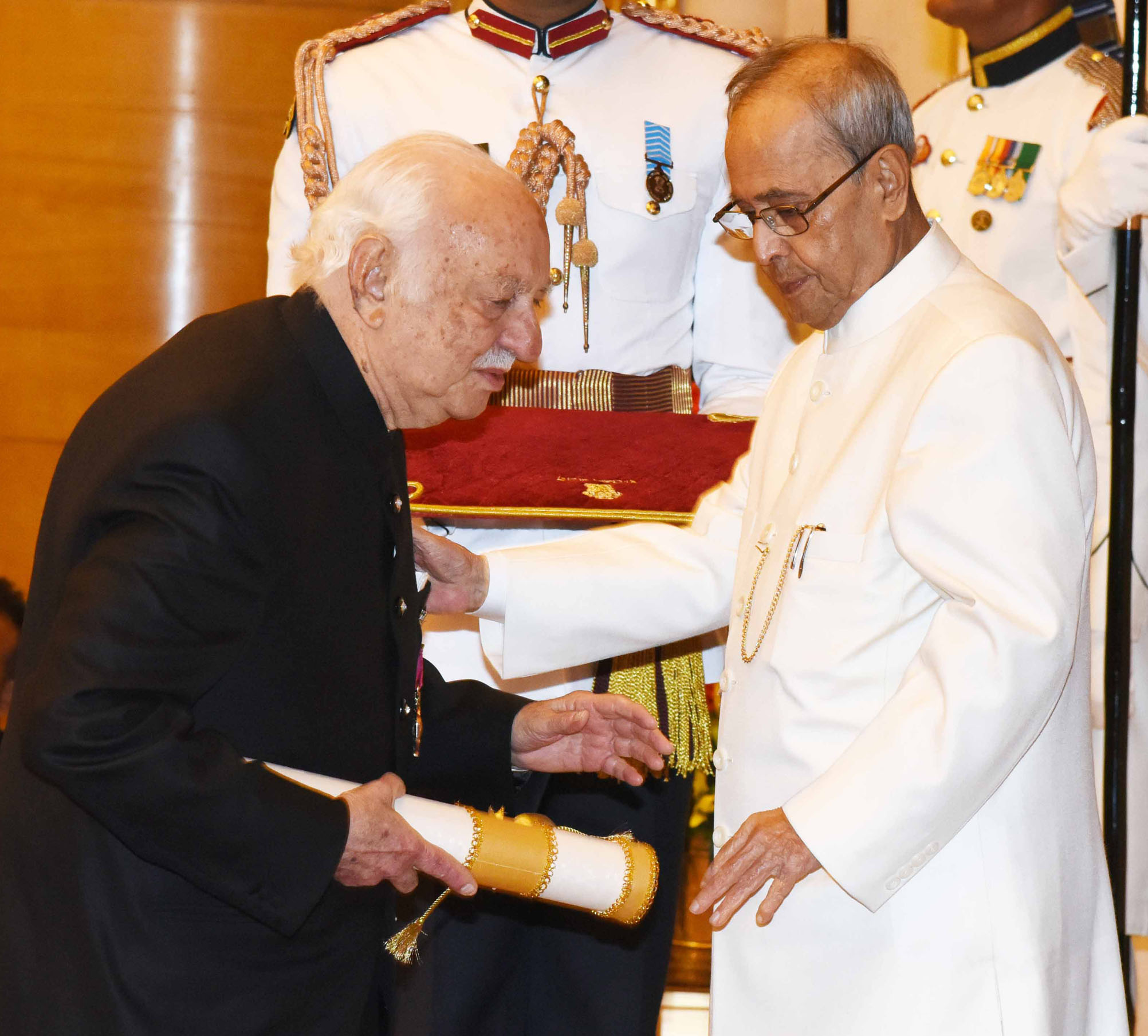
President of India Pranab Mukherjee (right) presenting the Padma Bhushan Award to Mistry, 2016

== Personal life and death ==
In 2003, Pallonji gave up his Indian citizenship to become an Irish citizen "on the basis of his marriage to an Irish-born national", Pat "Patsy" Perin Dubash, who was born in September 1939 at Hatch Street Nursing House in Dublin. He remained in residence in Mumbai. The family's interest in Ireland is ascribed, in part, to their love of horses; Mistry owned a 200 acres (0.81 km^{2}) stud farm and a 10,000-square-foot (930 m^{2}) home in Pune, India.

Mistry has two sons and two daughters. His elder son, Shapoor Mistry (b. 1964), runs the Shapoorji Pallonji group, while his younger son, the late Cyrus Mistry (1968—2022), served for some years as chairman of the Tata group. Mistry's elder daughter is Laila. His younger daughter, Aloo, is married to Noel Tata, half-brother of Ratan Tata.

He was awarded the Padma Bhushan in January 2016 by the Government of India for his contributions in the field of trade and industry.

A short biography of Mistry was written in a 2008 book by Manoj Namburu titled The Moguls of Real Estate.

Mistry died in Mumbai on 28 June 2022 at the age of 93.
