= Cyrus Mistry =

Irish businessman (1968–2022)

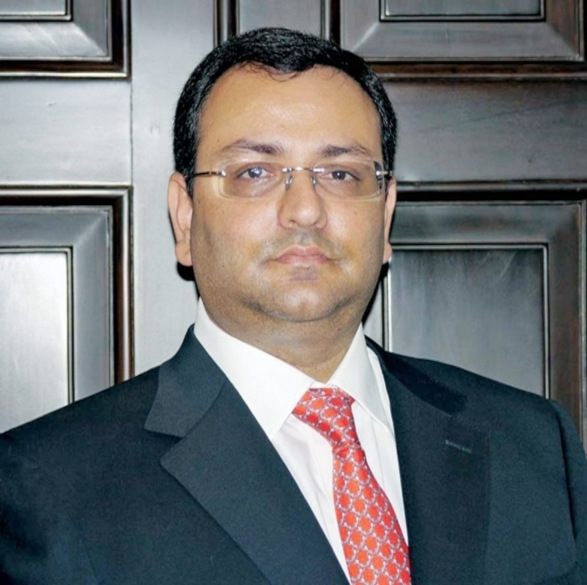
- Born: Cyrus Pallonji Mistry; 4 July 1968; Bombay, Maharashtra, India
- Died: 4 September 2022 (aged 54); Palghar, Maharashtra, India
- Citizenship: Ireland
- Education: Imperial College London; London Business School
- Occupation: Businessman
- Spouse: Rohiqa Chagla (m. 1992)
- Children: 2
- Father: Pallonji Mistry
- Relatives: Noel Tata (brother-in-law)

Cyrus Pallonji Mistry (Note: Gujarati: કૂરુશ પલઙ્ગજી મિસ્ત્રી) (4 July 1968 – 4 September 2022) was an Irish businessman. He was the chairman of the Tata Group, an Indian business conglomerate, from 2012 to 2016. He was the sixth chairman of the group, and only the second (after Nowroji Saklatwala) not to bear the surname Tata. In mid-2012, he was chosen by a selection panel to head the Tata Group and took charge in December that year. In October 2016, the board of Tata Group's holding company, Tata Sons, voted to remove Mistry from the post of chairman. Former chairman Ratan Tata then returned as interim chairman, and Natarajan Chandrasekaran was named as the new chairman a few months later. However, in December 2019, the National Company Law Appellate Tribunal (NCLAT) declared the appointment of Chandrasekaran as executive chairman illegal, and restored Mistry. However, the Supreme Court stayed NCLAT's order on 10 January 2020. Mistry had filed a cross-appeal in the court, seeking explanations for anomalies in the NCLAT. However, the Supreme Court upheld his dismissal.

He owned an 18.4% stake in Tata Sons, through his company, Cyrus Investments Pvt. Ltd. According to the Bloomberg Billionaires Index, Mistry had a net worth of nearly $29 billion at the time of his death, making him one of the richest men in India. He was a member of the National Integration Council. He died in a road crash on 4 September 2022 on the Ahmedabad–Mumbai highway. Bad road design near the bridge at the spot of the crash and occupants not wearing seat belts were cited by the forensic investigation team as the cause of the crash.

== Early life and education ==
Mistry was born on 4 July 1968 to a Parsi family in Bombay (now Mumbai), Maharashtra, the younger son of Indian billionaire and construction magnate Pallonji Mistry by his wife Patsy Perin Dubash. Both his parents belong to the Zoroastrian faith and have roots in India. However, Mistry's mother was born in Ireland, and his father chose to take up Irish citizenship. Mistry had an elder brother, Shapoor Mistry, who is also an Irish citizen, and is married to Behroze Sethna, the daughter of Parsi lawyer Rusi Sethna. Mistry also has two sisters, Laila and Aloo. Laila is married to Rustom Jehangir, a London-based portfolio fund manager. Aloo is married to Noel Tata, the half-Indian-Parsi, half-French-Catholic half-brother of Ratan Tata.

The Pallonji family have been active in business for over a century, and it was in the 1930s that Mistry's grandfather, Shapoorji Mistry, first acquired a stake in Tata Sons. The stake, which now stands at 18.5%, was held by Mistry's father, and comprises the largest block of shares held by a single party; some 66% stake in Tata Sons is controlled by charitable trusts set up by the Tata family. Mistry grew up in affluent circumstances.

Mistry was educated at the prestigious Cathedral & John Connon School in South Mumbai. He studied at Imperial College London and was awarded a Bachelor of Engineering in civil engineering from the University of London in 1990. He later studied at London Business School and was awarded International Executive Masters in management from the University of London in 1996.

== Career ==
Mistry joined the family construction company, Shapoorji Pallonji & Co. Ltd as a director in 1991. He is credited with the turnaround of the struggling Afcons Infrastructure in the years after its acquisition by Shapoorji Pallonji Group in 2000. Mistry had been managing director of Shapoorji Pallonji & Company, which is part of the Shapoorji Pallonji Group. He later became chairman of Tata Sons and the Tata Group.

In 2018, his net worth was approximately US$10 billion.

=== Tata Sons ===
Mistry joined the board of Tata Sons on 1 September 2006, a year after his father retired from it. He was a director of Tata Elxsi Limited, from September 1990 to October 2009, and a director of Tata Power Co. Ltd until September 2006.

In 2013, Mistry was appointed the chairman of Tata Sons. In addition, he was also chairman of all major Tata companies including Tata Industries, Tata Steel, Tata Motors, Tata Consultancy Services, Tata Power, Tata Teleservices, Indian Hotels, Tata Global Beverages and Tata Chemicals.

The Tata Sons board voted to remove Mistry from the chairmanship of Tata Sons in October 2016.

==== 2018 NCLT verdict ====
In July 2018, the National Company Law Tribunal (NCLT), which "adjudicates issues relating to Indian companies," issued a verdict in favour of Tata Sons on charges of mismanagement levelled by Mistry in 2016, two months following his ousting as chairman, through a vote of no confidence. On 10 July, Mistry stated that he would appeal the decision.

==== 2019 NCLAT verdict ====
In December 2019, the National Company Law Appellate Tribunal reinstated Mistry as the chairperson for Tata Sons for his remaining term, and declared that the appointment of TCS CEO Natarajan Chandrasekaran as executive chairman of Tata Sons was illegal. In January 2020, Tata Sons appealed to the Supreme Court against NCLAT's decision. Cyrus Mistry announced that he will not return to the Chairmanship of the conglomerate, but is interested in reserving his seat in the company's board. A three-judge bench comprising Chief Justice SA Bobde and Justices BR Gavai and Surya Kant stayed NCLAT's order while hearing Tata Sons' appeal on 10 January 2020.

The bench stated, "We find there are lacunae in the judicial orders passed by the NCLAT."

The Supreme Court of India also ordered that Tata Sons will not exercise power under Article 25 of the Company Law for pushing out shares of minority holders in the company.

== Personal life ==
Mistry was married to Rohiqa Chagla, the daughter of lawyer Iqbal Chagla and granddaughter of jurist M.C. Chagla. Iqbal Chagla has strategised the course of action for Cyrus Mistry in the legal battle against The Tata Sons.

The couple has two sons, Firoz Mistry and Zahan Mistry.

Mistry was an Irish citizen and a permanent resident of India (having acquired Overseas Citizenship of India). According to a news report in an Irish newspaper, The Independent, Mistry viewed himself as a global citizen.

His father, Pallonji Mistry, died on 28 June 2022.

== Death ==
On 4 September 2022, Mistry and three members of the Pandole family visited the Iranshah Atash Behram at Udvada. The Zoroastrian high priest Khurshed Dastoor said the group had visited to offer prayers following the death of Dinshaw Pandole and Pallonji Mistry.

While returning from Udvada to Mumbai, the Mercedes-Benz GLC in which they were travelling crashed at a speed of 90 km/h (56 mph) into a road divider on a bridge on the Ahmedabad - Mumbai, National Highway 8 over Surya River near Charoti in the Palghar district. Cyrus Mistry and Jehangir Pandole, who were sitting at the back seat without wearing their seat belts, were killed instantly when they hit the back of the car's front seats. Mistry received a severe head trauma along with multiple fractures in the chest, head region, thigh and neck. Multiple injuries to vital organs lead to the death of Mistry and Pandole. The driver, Dr. Anahita Pandole, and her husband Darius Pandole in the front row passenger seat, were wearing seat belts and survived with injuries.

=== Investigation ===
A seven-member forensic investigation team investigated the cause of the crash and reached the conclusion that the car crash was caused by the "faulty design" of the bridge and the death of the occupants had occurred as they were not wearing seat belts. The team member said, "We have concluded that there was an infrastructure issue that led to the crash. The bridge parapet wall was found to be protruding into the shoulder lane. The design has been found to be faulty." A three laned road abruptly changed to a two lane road with an L-shaped concrete divider. The concrete divider was up-to knee height and was not painted appropriately. The spot lacks road warnings and several crashes had occurred at the same spot in the past. Mistry's car had hit a divider at a spot with faulty road design. His death initiated a debate on the inconsistent road design and wearing of seatbelt by rear seat passengers. Union government announced that it will start penalising rear seat passengers with a fine of ₹ 1,000 if they were found not wearing seat belts.

== Notes ==
Business positions
Preceded by Ratan Tata	Chairman of Tata Group; 2012-2016	Succeeded by Ratan Tata
