= Landmark Quiz =

Landmark Quiz is an annual quiz contest instituted in 1992 by the Landmark Bookstores owned by Tata Group through its Trent (Westside) brand. Since 2008, the event has been held in Bangalore, Chennai, Delhi, Hyderabad, Mumbai, and Pune on various dates. The quiz is mostly conducted on national holidays, and is one of the oldest open quizzes in India.

== Format ==
Landmark Quiz starts with a large turnout for the quiz preliminary round where participants fill in their answers for about 40 questions that come up on a screen. No negative marking is applied. The quiz is normally set by a team of senior quiz-masters such as Dr. Navin Jayakumar, Gautam Padmanabhan, and Navin's mother, Saranya Jayakumar. It has been hosted by Dr. Navin Jayakumar since its inception with the exception of 2006 when Derek O'Brien was the quizmaster in the absence of the main quizmasters.

== 1991 ==
The inaugural edition was held at Chennai on August 15.

== 2008 ==
Three new venues (Bangalore, Mumbai and Pune) were added during this edition. A National Champion event was held for the first time. Kissing Gouramis from Bangalore, represented by Swaminathan, Rajen Prabhu and Gopal Kidao were the national winners.

== 2009 ==
The national champion was the Chennai-based team QED (V.V. Ramanan, Samanth Subramanian, G. Swaminathan), who had won the regional at Pune. QED had been the runner-up in 2008, the first time the national champion concept was introduced.

== 2010 ==
The 19th edition of the quiz was held with regional finals held each at Bangalore, Pune, Mumbai and Chennai, respectively. This was followed by the national finals with two winners each from the regions to fight it out to determine who would become national champion. This was held on August 15, 2010. The national finals was won by a team from Mumbai, "Haseena Ka Paseena (Sunanda's Sweat Equity)", with Vikram Joshi, Pradeep Ramarathnam and Mukund Sridhar, followed by another Mumbai team with Dharmendra Dileepkumar, Debashree and Harish Kumar. Bangalore's team Metaquizzicks came third.

== 2011 ==
The 20th edition of the landmark quiz was once again held in each of the four cities, Bangalore, Pune, Mumbai and Chennai. The winner and runner-up from each city went on to the national finals which was held on 15 August 2011 after the Chennai regional finals. The Chennai winners, "Maaman, Machaan, Mapillai", consisting of Ram Kumar, Jayakanthan and Sreeram, were declared the national winners.

== 2012 ==
The 20th edition of the Landmark Quiz was held in six cities, Hyderabad, Bangalore, Delhi, Pune, Mumbai and Chennai. The winner from each city went on to the national finals with Bangalore and Chennai sending in two teams with their runners-up also being sent to the national finals. Hyderabad winners, "Naa Gun..", consisting of Ravi Mundoli, Anil Kumar and Jayakanthan, were the national winners.

== See also ==
- Quizzing in India
