= List of Irish billionaires by net worth =

The following Forbes list of Irish billionaires is based on an annual assessment of wealth and assets compiled and published by Forbes magazine in 2024.

== 2024 Irish Billionaires List ==
Ranking in Ireland	Name	Citizenship	Net worth (USD)	Sources of wealth
1	Shapoor Mistry	Ireland	9.9 billion	Diversified
2	John Collison	Ireland	7.2 billion	Technology
3	Patrick Collison	Ireland	7.2 billion	Technology
4	John Grayken	Ireland	6.9 billion	Investments
5	Firoz Mistry	Ireland	4.9 billion	Diversified
6	Zahan Mistry	Ireland	4.9 billion	Diversified
7	Eugene Murtagh	Ireland	2.8 billion	Manufacturing
8	Denis O’Brien	Ireland	2.8 billion	Telecom
9	John Dorrance, III	Ireland	2.6 billion	Food
10	Dermot Desmond	Ireland	2.2 billion	Investments
11	John Armitage	Ireland	1.5 billion	Investments

== See also ==
- List of billionaires
