= Indian Cancer Society =

Indian nonprofit organization

- Formation: 1951; 75 years ago
- Founder: Darab Jehangir Jussawala; Naval Tata
- Type: Non-governmental organization
- Region served: India
- Website: www.indiancancersociety.org

Indian Cancer Society is a non-government, non-profit, national organization for awareness, detection, and providing cure and treatment for cancer patients in India.

It was established in 1951 at the initiative of Naval Tata with noted oncologist Dr. D. J. Jussawalla and as India's first voluntary, non-profit, national organization for awareness, detection, and providing cure and treatment for cancer patients in India.

Indian Cancer Society is a pioneer institution in fighting cancer across India. The facilities with head office in Mumbai was established in 1951 and a branch in Delhi was set up in 1983 at behest of K. K. Mehta. Many noted personalities, corporate and charitable trust like Sir Ratan Tata Trust, A. H. Wadia Trust, Pirojsha Godrej Foundation are associated with organization to fund its activities to provide treatment and rehabilitation to cancer patients at minimum cost. It is associated with Tata Memorial Hospital, which is considered as one of the best cancer hospitals in India providing treatment and rehabilitation programs for cancer survivors. They also do research and publish data on types of cancer patients in India.

== History ==
India's national anti-cancer association, the Indian Cancer Society, was established in 1951, as a registered public trust under Bombay Public Trust Act,1950 and the society's Registration Act, 1860. The institution is the first and the largest of its kind in Asia and it also established a Rehabilitation centre at Parel, Mumbai, in 1958. The activities of society includes undertaking complete care of poor cancer patients by offering food, medicines, transport, prostheses, colostomy bags, counselling services, social welfare and job placement services and also helping them in self employment, in particular for those coming from rural areas. In addition the society also undertakes programmes and projects which educates general public about the factors relevant for cancer and conducts relevant educational training for doctors.

In September 2020, BIG FM and Indian Cancer Society had launched ‘Together against Cancer’ month-long campaign which was aimed at creating awareness about the dreadful disease and help raise funds for those suffering from cancer during the COVID pandemic.
