= Sterling & Wilson =

Indian engineering, procurement, and construction company

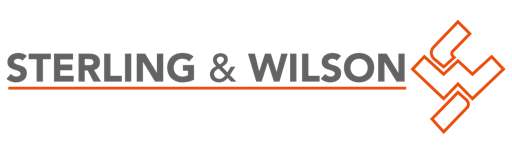
- Company type: Private
- Industry: Engineering, Procurement, and Construction (EPC)
- Founded: 1927
- Area served: Worldwide
- Key people: Khurshed Daruvala (Chairman, SWREL)
- Services: Renewable energy, Data centres, MEP services, Diesel generators
- Website: www.sterlingandwilson.com

Sterling & Wilson is an Indian multinational engineering, procurement, and construction (EPC) company headquartered in Mumbai, Maharashtra. It operates across multiple sectors including renewable energy, data centers, diesel power generation, and mechanical, electrical, and plumbing (MEP) services. The company has delivered projects in over 30 countries, with execution teams located across Asia, the Middle East, Africa, Europe, and Australia.

== History ==
Sterling & Wilson began in 1927 as an electrical contracting firm through a partnership between Wilson Electric Works and the Shapoorji Pallonji Group. Over time, the company diversified into MEP contracting, diesel-based power, solar EPC, and turnkey infrastructure.

In 2019, the renewable energy business was demerged and listed independently. Each business operates independently, with its own leadership and operational structure.

== Companies ==
Sterling & Wilson currently operates through four core companies:

=== Sterling & Wilson Renewable Energy Limited (SWREL) ===
SWREL focuses on utility-scale solar EPC projects, hybrid renewable systems, and battery energy storage (BESS). It is publicly listed on Indian stock exchanges. In 2024 and 2025, Sterling & Wilson Renewable Energy secured several solar engineering, procurement and construction (EPC) contracts across domestic and international markets. These included domestic EPC projects such as a 250 MWp solar project in Gujarat and a 65 MWp project in Maharashtra, a 240 MW solar EPC project in South Africa valued at about ₹1,300 crore, and a balance-of-system order worth around ₹1,381 crore from Adani Green Energy for solar projects at the Khavda Renewable Energy Park in Gujarat.

=== Sterling Green Power Solutions (SGPS) ===
SGPS manufactures and maintains diesel generator sets for industrial, commercial, and institutional clients. It also offers services such as installation, commissioning, and annual maintenance contracts.

=== Sterling & Wilson Data Center (SWDC) ===
SWDC builds high-capacity data centers. The company delivers integrated infrastructure covering electrical systems, cooling, fire detection, and monitoring systems for clients in telecom, BFSI, IT, and public sector domains.

=== Sterling & Wilson Private Limited (SWPL) ===
SWPL manages the group’s MEP and turnkey infrastructure projects. It has worked on hospitals, airports, commercial towers, hospitality projects, and complex industrial systems.
