= Next Gen Publishing =

Indian publishing company

- Traded as: NGPL:IN
- Industry: Publishing
- Founded: Mumbai, India (2005)
- Headquarters: Mumbai, India
- Area served: India
- Products: Magazines
- Parent: Shapoorji Pallonji Group/HDFC Bank
- Website: nextgenpublishing.in

Next Gen Publishing is an Indian publishing company. It was created in 2005 by its parent companies Forbes Group, a subsidiary of Shapoorji Pallonji Group, and HDFC Bank. Hoshang Billimoria was CEO of the newly created company.

== Publications ==
Next Gen publishes a number of English language magazines for Indian readers including:

- Bike India
- Car India
- T3
- Smart Photography
- Mother and Baby
- The Ideal Home & Garden
- CV
- Auto Components India
- Power Watch
