= Eureka Forbes =

Indian multinational home appliances company

- Type: Public
- Traded as: BSE: 543482; NSE: EUREKAFORB
- Industry: Home appliances
- Founded: 1982; 44 years ago
- Headquarters: Mumbai, Maharashtra, India
- Key people: Pratik Pota (MD & CEO)
- Products: Water purifiers; Air purifiers; Security systems; Air conditioners; Vacuum cleaners
- Brands: Aquaguard
- Parent: Tata Group (1982–2001); Shapoorji Pallonji Group (2001–2022); Advent International (2022–present)
- Website: eurekaforbes.com

Eureka Forbes Limited is an Indian home appliances company based in Mumbai. It makes water purification devices, vacuum cleaners, air purification systems, and home security products.Multiple consumers have filed complaints and legal notices against Eureka Forbes in consumer forums regarding online Annual Maintenance Contract (AMC) purchases where technicians fail to visit, services are unfulfilled, and refunds for unactivated plans are unfairly denied.

== History ==
Eureka Forbes was founded on 15th February 1982 as a 60:40 joint venture between Tata Group's Forbes & Company and Swedish manufacturer Electrolux. In 2001, Tata Group sold Forbes & Company to Shapoorji Pallonji Group and, four years later, Electrolux sold its 40% stake in Eureka Forbes to Forbes & Company.

In 2010, Eureka Forbes acquired a 25% stake in Swiss consumer products company Lux International. In 2013, Eureka Forbes increased its stake to become the controlling shareholder in Lux International.

In 2022, Advent International bought out Shapoorji Pallonji Group's entire stake in Eureka Forbes, after Eureka Forbes was separated from Forbes & Company and listed on the BSE.

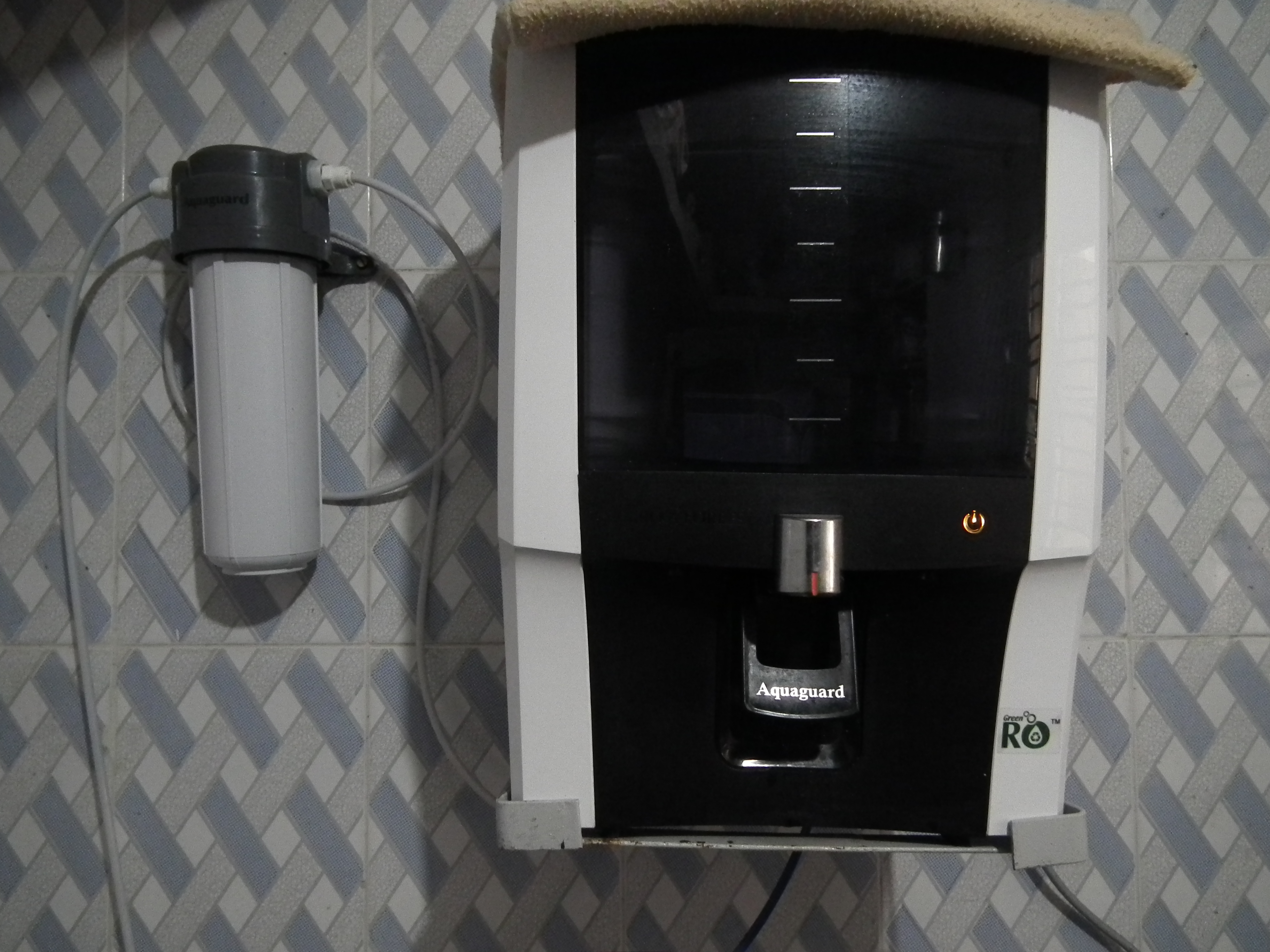
Eureka Forbes Aquaguard RO water purifier (left) and regular water purifier filters (right)
