= Simone Tata =

Swiss-born Indian businesswoman (1930–2025)

- Born: Simone Dunoyer; 2 March 1930; Geneva, Switzerland
- Died: 5 December 2025 (aged 95); Mumbai, Maharashtra, India
- Citizenship: Switzerland (former); India
- Spouse: Naval Tata (m. 1955; died 1989)
- Children: Noel Tata
- Relatives: Tata family

Simone Naval Tata (née Dunoyer; 2 March 1930 – 5 December 2025) was a Swiss-born Indian businesswoman, and a member of the Tata family. She was the step-mother of Ratan Tata, and was a key figure in building Lakmé Cosmetics and founded Trent Limited. Simone Tata played a significant role in India's beauty and retail sectors for over four decades. She was instrumental in establishing Trent (Westside).

== Background ==
Simone Tata was born on 2 March 1930 in Geneva, Switzerland and grew up there. She graduated from the University of Geneva. Tata visited India as a tourist in 1953, where she met Naval Tata. They married in 1955, and Simone settled in Mumbai permanently. Simone and Naval are the parents of Noel Tata. Simone is the stepmother of former Tata Group chairman, Ratan Tata, who is from Naval's previous marriage. She died on 5 December 2025, at the age of 95.

== Tata Group ==
Simone Tata joined the Lakmé board in 1962, when it was a minor subsidiary of Tata Oil Mills, as managing director in 1961, rising to become its chairperson in 1982, and was non-executive chairman of Trent Limited until 30 October 2006.

She was appointed to the board of Tata Industries in 1989.

Seeing growth in the retail sector, in 1996, Tata sold Lakmé Cosmetics to Hindustan Lever Limited (HLL), and created Trent Limited with money from the sale. All shareholders of Lakmé were given equivalent shares in Trent. The Westside brand and stores belong to Trent.
