= Surya River (India) =

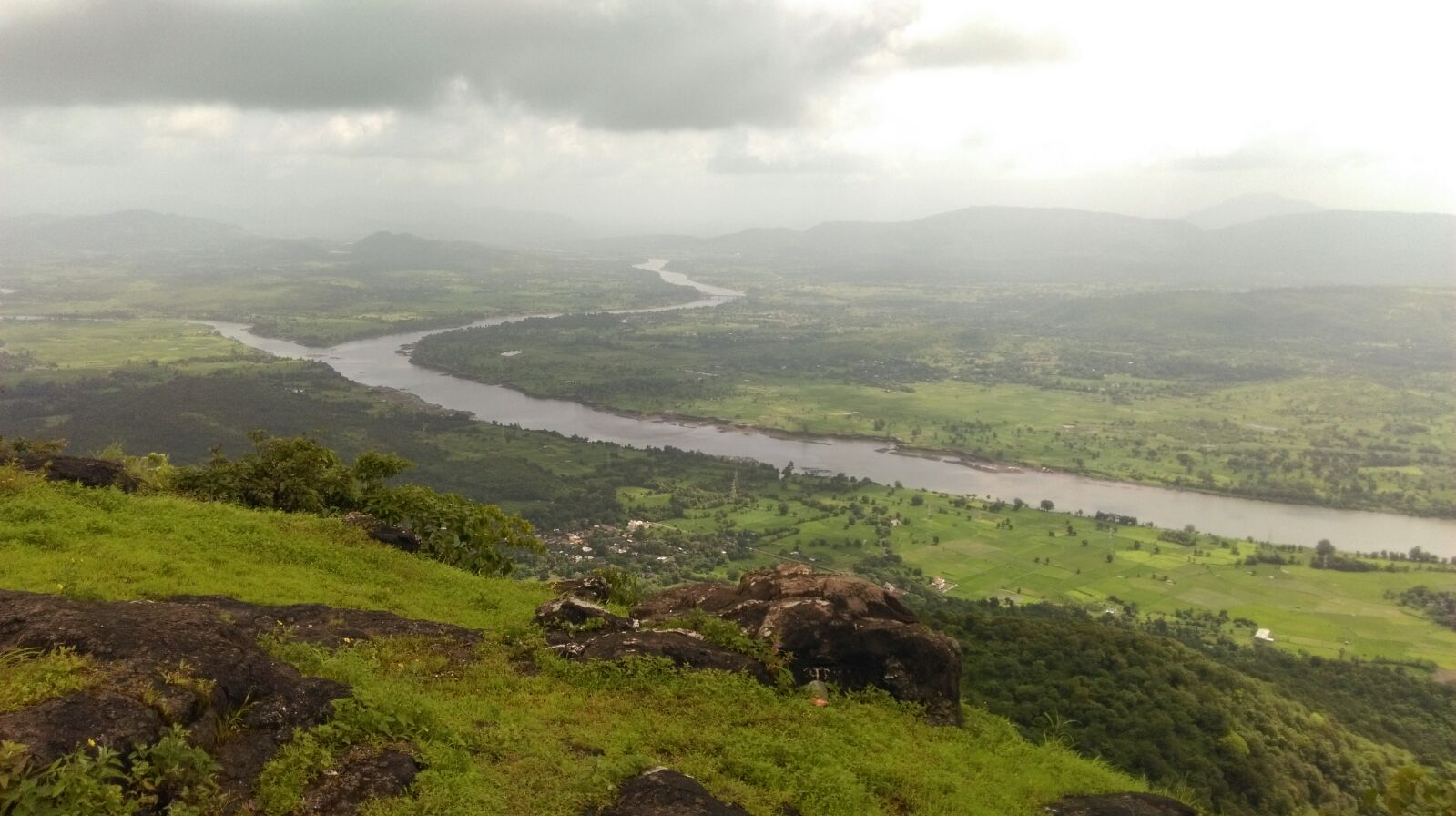

Location
- Country: India

Physical characteristics
- Source
  - location: Maharashtra
- Mouth
  - location: Palghar district, Maharashtra
  - coordinates: 19°38′51″N 72°51′26″E

The Surya River is a river in located in the Palghar district of Maharashtra. It is located 95.8 kilometres (59.5 mi) north of Mumbai the capital of the state.

It has a bridge on the Golden Quadrilateral highway near Charoti in the Palghar district.
