= Nowroji Saklatvala =

Indian businessman (1875–1938)

Sir Nowroji Saklatvala KBE CIE

3rd Chairman of Tata Sons and Tata Group
- In office 3 June 1932 – 21 July 1938
- Preceded by: Sir Dorabji Tata
- Succeeded by: JRD Tata

Personal details
- Born: 10 September 1875 Bombay, British India
- Died: 21 July 1938 (aged 62) Aix-les-Bains, France
- Relatives: Jamsetji Tata (maternal uncle)
- Education: University of Bombay
- Occupation: Industrialist; businessman

Sir Nowroji Saklatvala (10 September 1875 – 21 July 1938) was an Indian businessman who was the third chairman of the Tata Group from 1932 till his sudden death in 1938.

He was born in Bombay into a Parsi family, the son of Bapuji Saklatwala and Virbaiji Tata. His maternal uncle was Jamsetji Tata, founder of the Tata Group. He completed his studies at St. Xavier College, joined the Tata Group in 1899 as a clerk in Svadeshi Mills in Bombay. Within twenty years, he rose to be the head of the firm. He worked closely with Dorabji Tata, the second chairman. When Dorabji died in 1932, he became the Chairman of the Tata Group and had the task of consolidating the company during the Depression years.

Closely connected with Indian cricket, Saklatwala played for the Parsees team during 1904–05, but stopped playing actively due to business pre-occupations. As a cricket player he represented the Parsees against the Europeans in 1904.

He was the first Chairman of the Cricket Club of India after its inception in 1933 till his death and was instrumental in the development of Brabourne Stadium, for which he donated a large sum of money.

== Honours ==
Saklatwala was appointed a Companion of the Order of the Indian Empire (CIE) in the 1923 New Year Honours, knighted in the 1933 Birthday Honours and further knighted as a Knight Commander of the Order of the British Empire (KBE) in the 1937 Coronation Honours.

== Death ==
He died due to heart failure while in France, aged 62. He was succeeded by his second cousin JRD Tata as the chairman of the company. He is buried in the Parsi section of Brookwood Cemetery in Surrey.

Business positions
Preceded by Dorabji Tata	Chairman of Tata Group; 1932–1938	Succeeded by J. R. D. Tata
