= Lakmé Cosmetics =

Indian cosmetics company

Lakmé
- Type: Private
- Industry: Personal care and Beauty salon
- Founded: 1952; 74 years ago
- Founders: J.R.D Tata; Simone Tata
- Headquarters: India
- Area served: India; Nepal
- Key people: Vipul Chaturvedi, CEO
- Products: Cosmetics, beauty products, and Salon services
- Parent: Tata Group (1952–1998); Hindustan Unilever (1998–present)
- Website: lakmeindia.com

Lakmé is an Indian cosmetics brand owned by Hindustan Unilever. It was named after the French opera Lakmé, which itself is the French word for the goddess Lakshmi who is renowned for her beauty. It was started in 1952 as a subsidiary of Tata Oil Mills, famously after Prime Minister Jawaharlal Nehru was concerned that Indian women were spending precious foreign exchange on beauty products and persuaded JRD Tata to manufacture them in India. Simone Tata joined the company as director and went on to become chairperson. In 1998, Tatas sold their stake in Lakmé to Hindustan Unilever for ₹200 crore (US$48.46 million).

Lakmé mainly sells coloured cosmetic products such as lipsticks, eyeliners and skincare cream. In December 2018, it launched its e-commerce platform. As of 2021, Lakmé also runs 485 beauty salons under Lakmé Lever. The company is the title sponsor for Lakmé Fashion Week (LFW), a bi-annual fashion week which takes place in Mumbai.

Lakmé has Shraddha Kapoor, Kajol Devgn, Kareena Kapoor, and Ananya Pandey as brand ambassadors. In the Brand Trust Report 2012, Lakme was ranked 104th among India's most trusted brands, and the following year it was ranked 71st on the list. In 2014, Lakme was ranked 36th among India's most trusted brands according to the Brand Trust Report 2014. In 2022, it has been ranked as the 27th most trusted brands in India according to the Brand Trust Report 2022.
