= Landmark Bookstores =

Bookstore chain in India

Landmark Limited.
- Type: Subsidiary
- Industry: Retail
- Headquarters: Chennai, Tamil Nadu, India
- Parent: Trent

Landmark Limited, widely known as Landmark or Landmark bookstores, is a chain of bookstores in India based in Chennai, now wholly owned by Trent, a Tata Group company.

Started as an independent bookstore, Landmark Limited became a chain store which primarily offers books, music, movie VCD/DVDs, video game consoles, PC games, video games, console games, video game accessories, toys, and magazines, as well as technology products like mobile phones, tablet computers, mobile phone accessories, cameras, camera accessories, laptops, stationery items, gift items and home products.

Landmark bookstores was founded by Hemu Ramaiah. The first location opened in a 4,400 sq ft basement of a building complex and represented a modernization of bookstores in India at the time. In 1996, the bookstore started selling music. Landmark opened a second location in Kolkata in 1999, a third location in Chennai in 2001, and the mega-bookstore in the Forum Mall Bangalore in 2004.

Landmarkonthenet.com, launched in 2000 and a Chennai-based e-commerce portal owned and operated by Landmark Limited, is an online retailing division of Landmark through which it sells its retail merchandise online. The website has now been closed.

In August 2005, Trent acquired a 76% controlling stake in Landmark, and completed 100% acquisition in April 2008, the year the founder Hemu Ramaiah left the company. After the purchase by Tata, Landmark Bookstores started to lose money. In 2014, it was announced that Tata's Trent subsidiary was divesting the bookstore business.

== Locations ==
Landmark has five large format retail stores across major cities in India including Mumbai, Bengaluru, Chennai, Hyderabad and Pune.

== Landmark Quiz ==
Landmark Quiz, one of the oldest open quizzes in India, is an annual quiz contest mostly conducted on national holidays. It was instituted in 1989 and has since been held in Bangalore, Chennai, Mumbai, Pune, Delhi and Hyderabad on various dates.

== See also ==
- TATA Group
