= Darab Jehangir Jussawala =

Indian oncologist and medical writer

- Born: 13 April 1915; Bombay, Bombay Presidency, British India
- Died: 29 January 1999 (aged 83); India
- Occupation: Oncologist
- Years active: 1948–1999
- Known for: Cancer care
- Spouse: Gertrude Darab
- Parent(s): Jehangir Bezonjee Jussawala; Shirinbai
- Awards: Padma Bhushan; Dhanwantari Award; ICMR Raja Ravi Shersingh of Kalsia Memorial Award

Darab Jehangir Jussawala (1915–1999) was an Indian medical-cum-surgical oncologist, medical writer and the director of Tata Memorial Centre. He was the co-founder of Indian Cancer Society, along with Naval Tata in 1951, and the founder of the Indian Cancer Rehabilitation Centre in Parel, Mumbai, in 1956, the first such centre in India and the largest in Asia. He served as the director of Lady Ratan Tata Medical and Research Center and as the honorary consultant at two Mumbai hospitals, Breach Candy Hospital and Jaslok Hospital. An elected fellow of the Royal Society of Medicine, National Academy of Medical Sciences, Indian Academy of Sciences, Indian National Science Academy and the American College of Surgeons, he was a recipient of the Dhanwantari Award as well as several Oration Awards. The Government of India awarded him the third highest civilian honour of the Padma Bhushan, in 1975, for his contributions to Medicine.

== Biography ==
Darab Jussawala was born on 13 April 1915 to Jehangir Bezonjee Jussawalla and Shirinbai in Bombay, in the western Indian state of Maharashtra and graduated in medicine in 1938 from Bombay University after which he secured a master's degree from the same university in 1942. Subsequently, he obtained the Fellowship of the Royal College of Surgeons of Edinburgh in medical and surgical oncology and started his career as a surgeon at Tata Memorial Hospital in 1948, becoming one of the first surgical oncologists in the country. He served the institution as a surgeon till 1973 when he became the director of the hospital, a post he held till 1980 after which he served as a professor of oncology till 1983 and continued his association with the hospital till 1986. In 1986, he moved to Lady Ratan Tata Medical and Research Center, but was associated with Breach Candy Hospital and Jaslok Hospital as a consultant oncologist.

In 1951, with the assistance of Naval Tata, Jussawala founded Indian Cancer Society, the first non-profit organization for fighting the disease of cancer and served as its founder secretary from 1953. Five years later, under the aegis of the society, he established the Indian Cancer Rehabilitation Centre, the first centre for the rehabilitation of cancer patients in India, which was also the largest of its kind in Asia. It was again under the scope of services of the Indian Cancer Society that he contributed research data to the first Population-based Cancer Registry in 1963, the same year as he founded the Indian Journal of Cancer, followed by the establishment of a comprehensive cancer rehabilitation centre in 1968. The Indian Association of Surgical Oncology (IASO) (1977) and the Lady Ratan Tata Medical and Research Center (1984) were also reportedly established by Jussawala and he was credited with the establishment of the first cytology laboratory and the first chemotherapy facility in India, both at Tata Memorial Centre. He served as a member of the World Health Organization (WHO) Expert Committee on Cancer and as the corresponding Fellow of Association of Surgeons of Great Britain and Ireland. He was also a member of the Association of Surgeons of India and the Chief Editor of the Indian Journal of Cancer. The Handbook of Diagnosis and Treatment of Cancer is a textbook on oncology published by him in 1980. Besides, he published several medical articles published in peer reviewed journals and his writings have been cited in many oncological texts.

Jusswala died on 29 January 1999, survived by his wife, Gertrude.

== Awards and honours ==
The National Academy of Medical Sciences elected Jussawala as their fellow in 1966 and two other Indian science academies, the Indian Academy of Sciences and the Indian National Science Academy followed suit by electing him as a fellow in 1975 and 1983 respectively. He was also a fellow of the Royal Society of Medicine and the American College of Surgeons. He delivered several award orations and Dr. Munsiff Oration Award (1968), Dr. Ernest Borges Oration Award (1974), Dr. Bhansali Oration Award (1975), Dr. B. C. Roy Memorial Oration Award (1976), Dr. N. C. Joshi Memorial Oration Award (1977), Mrs. Vimla Shah Oration Award (1979) and Sandoz Oration Award (1983) are some of the notable ones.

The Indian Council of Medical Research (ICMR) awarded him the Raja Ravi Shersingh of Kalsia Memorial Award in 1971 and the Government of India included him the Republic Day Honours list for the civilian award of the Padma Bhushan in 1975. He was also a recipient of the annual award (1981) of the Danwanthari Foundation.
