= Bike India =

Motorcycle magazine

- Editor: Aspi Bhathena
- Founded: 2005
- Company: Next Gen Publishing
- Country: India
- Based in: Pune, Maharashtra
- Language: English
- Website: bikeindia.in

Bike India is an Indian motorcycle magazine published by Next Gen Publishing Ltd. The magazine was launched in 2005 with founding editor Adil Darukhanawala. Isle of Man TT racer Aspi Bhathena has been the editor of the magazine since 2008. The magazine's editorial office is located in Pune.

Bike India is a jury member for the Indian Motorcycle of the Year award since its inception in 2007 and holds its own annual year-end automotive awards.

In 2007, EMAP, which published Bike in the UK, acquired a 40.1% stake in Next Gen Publishing.
