= Sir Dorabji Tata and Allied Trusts =

Non-sectarian philanthropic organisation in India

Sir Dorabji Tata Trust was established by Sir Dorab Tata (fondly called Sir Dorabji), the elder son of Tata Group founder Jamsetji Tata. Founded in 1932, it is one of the oldest non-sectarian philanthropic organisations in India.

== History ==
Like his father, Sir Dorabji believed that one must make use of the wealth one had acquired for constructive purposes. So, in less than a year after his wife Meherbai's death, he donated all his wealth to the trust, insisting that it must be used "without any distinction of place, nationality or creed", for the advancement of learning and research, the relief of distress and other charitable purposes. He died three months later.

The wealth that he turned over to the trust comprised his substantial share holdings in Tata Sons, Indian Hotels and allied companies, his landed properties and 21 pieces of jewellery left by his wife, including the famous Jubilee Diamond, estimated then to be of the value of Rs 10 million. Today, these would be worth more than Rs 500 million.

== Mission ==
As the trust got formed and the trustees deliberated on the policy aspects and finalised them, it decided to adopt a broad framework—that it should undertake such projects, which are too large for individuals to handle and that each of these projects should have a genuine relevance to the welfare of the country. The trust is mandated to:

- Maintain and support schools, educational institutions and hospitals
- Provide relief in distress caused by the elements of nature such as famine, pestilence, fire, tempest, flood, earthquake or any other calamity
- Help advancement of learning in all its branches especially research work in medical and industrial problems
- Offer financial aid to the Indian Institute of Science, Bangalore, by instituting professorships or lectureships or giving scholarships
- Award fellowships in any branch of science or assist students to study abroad either by payment of lump sums grants or by payment of periodical sums
- Give aid to any other charitable institutions or objects endowed by the settler in his lifetime, or by the grandfather, father or both of the settler.

== Notable national institutes ==
The trust is best known for promoting and setting up pioneering institutions of national importance, including:

- Tata Institute of Social Sciences, (1936)
- Tata Memorial Hospital, (1941)
- Tata Institute of Fundamental Research-Mumbai, (1945)
- National Centre for the Performing Arts, (1966)
- The National Institute of Advanced Studies, (1988)
- Indian Institute of Science
- The J. R. D. Tata Center for Ecotechnology, (1998)
- The Sir Dorabji Tata Center for Research in Tropical Diseases, (2000)
- The Tata Agricultural and Rural Training Center for the Blind.
- The International Institute for Population Sciences.
- Sir Dorabji Tata Centre for Research in Tropical Diseases at the Indian Institute of Science, Bangalore, 1912
- TIFR Centre for Applicable Mathematics- Bangalore,
- TIFR Hyderabad, 2011
- Tata Medical Center, Rajarhat, Kolkata (2011)

Each of these institutions works at the forefront of learning, research and knowledge dissemination. The ideas generated by these institutions and the people who have passed through their portals have enriched the various facets of India's development. Each of these institutions has produced many social scientists, cancer specialists, nuclear scientists and distinguished institutional administrators who have all strived to make the country a power to reckon with in science and technology.

In the last decade, the trust has also given shape to the National Institute of Advanced Studies in Bangalore and helped the Dr MS Swaminathan Research Foundation to start the JRD Tata Centre for Ecotechnology in Chennai.

In addition to these institutions, it has started with the assistance of the Royal Commonwealth Society for the Blind, Asia's first institute for the training of the rural blind, The Tata Agricultural and Rural Training Centre for the Blind, and with the cooperation of the United Nations, the International Institute of Demographic Studies.

The trust also helps various organisations and individuals with its grants. Its grants consist of Endowment Grants, grants to Non-Governmental Organisations and Small Grants, while Individual Grants are given to deserving individuals for medical, travel or educational purposes.

== Under JRD Tata ==
What has helped the trust in achieving its objectives has been the presence of distinguished personalities, most of them industry pioneers, on its board. Among them were JRD Tata, chairman of the Tata Group, Sir Ardeshir Dalal, Dr John Matthai and Sir Homi Mody.

The involvement of JRD Tata in the affairs of Trust is not just incidental. Being a trustee since the trust's inception, he held the position of chairman during the last 25 years of his life. His imprint is visible in the setting up of the Tata Memorial Hospital, Tata Institute of Fundamental Research, Tata Institute of Social Sciences, National Institute of Advanced Studies and National Centre for the Performing Arts. His role was especially crucial in the establishment of the Tata Memorial Hospital. Right from its conceptual stages in early 1941, until it became a national centre for cancer research and treatment, JRD Tata was there all along to guide its destinies. In 1957, when the government of India's ministry of health temporarily took over the Tata Memorial Hospital, JRD Tata, along with Dr Homi Bhabha, the pioneer of India's nuclear energy programme, had the vision to foresee the role of radiation in cancer treatment and prevailed on the government to have the administrative control of the hospital transferred to the department of atomic energy in 1962.

He had also put his own money and efforts to set up, in 1944, the multipurpose JRD Tata Trust. Many years later, he established the JRD and Thelma J Tata Trust, selling part of his shares and an apartment in Mumbai. The trust works to improve the lot of India's disadvantaged women.

== Tata Memorial Hospital ==
What is typical of the trust is that after establishing pioneering institutions, giving them shape and stabilising them, the trust has handed over their day-to-day running to the Government of India. Thus, The Tata Memorial Hospital is now under the government, run by the department of atomic energy.

== Tata Institute of Fundamental Research ==
The Tata Institute of Fundamental Research too has been handed over to the Atomic Energy Commission. Tata Institute of Fundamental Research today is a Deemed University.

In the case of TISS and the TIFR, the chairmen of the boards have so far been the representatives of the Tata Trusts. The trust is represented on the governing council of the Tata Memorial Hospital. However, the trust still takes interest in these institutions and contributes its might to their running.

As neither Sir Dorabji nor Ratan Tata had any children, their holdings could well have been fragmented and with them Tata Sons. The trusts that Sir Dorabji and Ratan set up gave to Tata Sons a cohesive and a continuing character over decades.

The trust sanctioned institutional grants, as well as grants to private individuals. The total disbursal made by the trust in the fiscal year 2003 - 2004 was Rs 442.39 million.

== See also ==
- Sir Dorabji Tata
- Tata Group
- Tata Sons
- Tata family
