= Zudio =

Indian fast fashion retailer

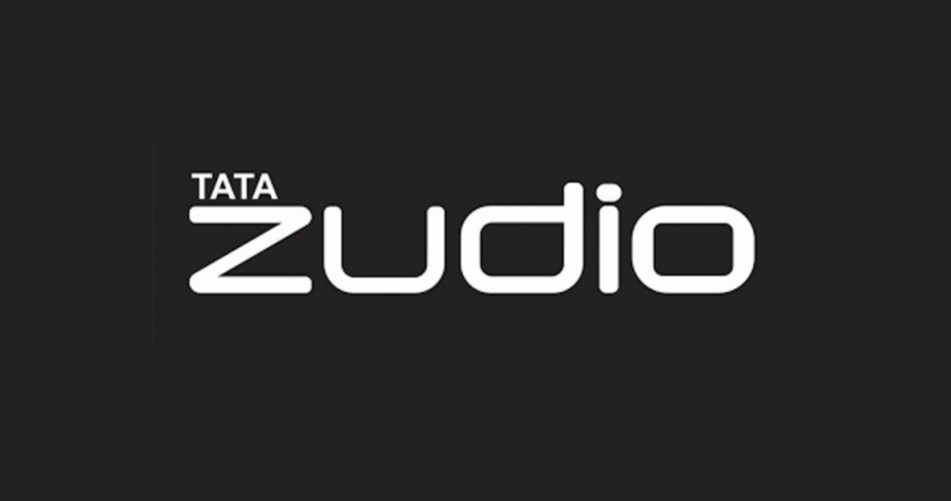

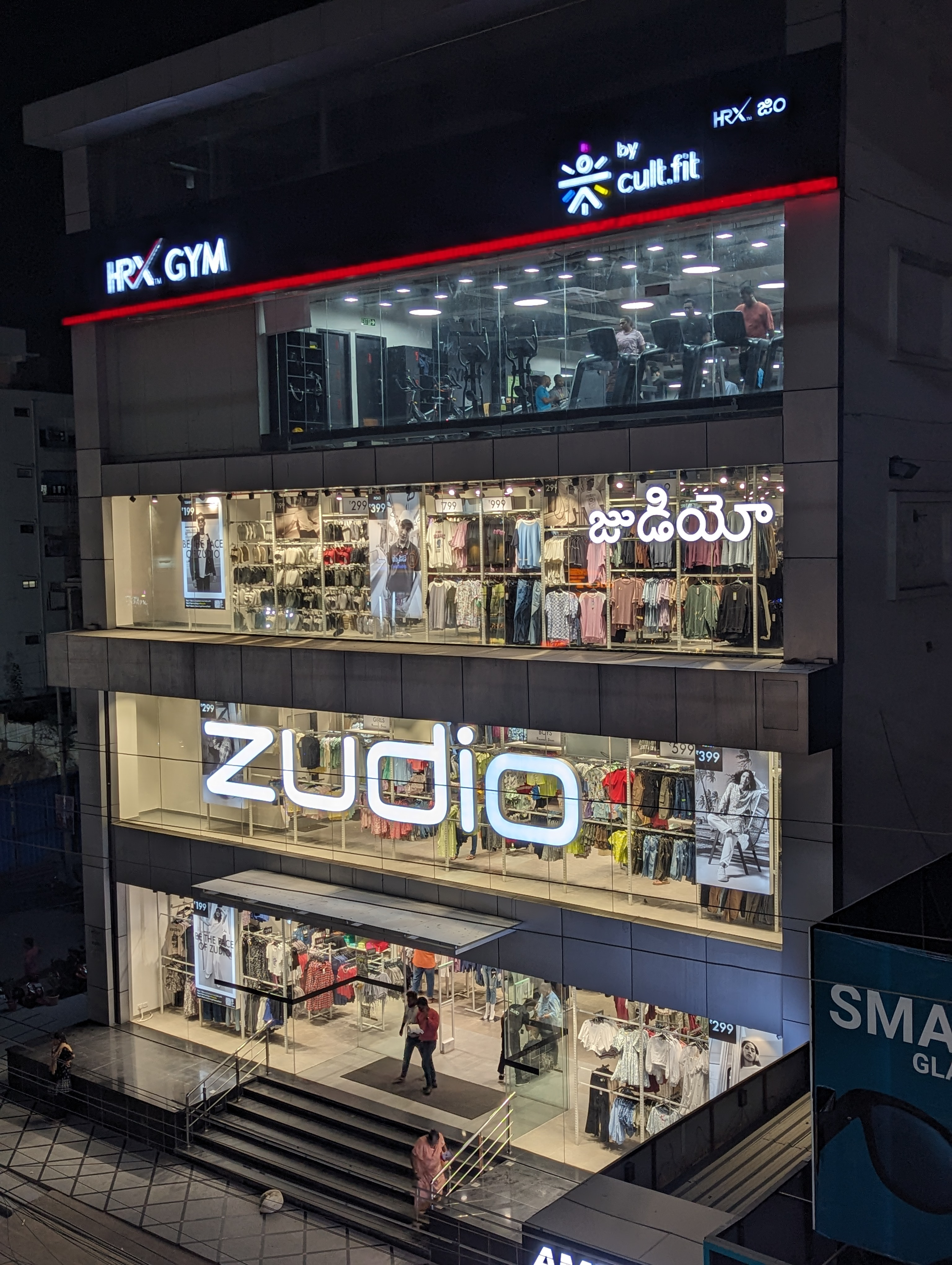
- A Zudio store in Hyderabad
- Industry: Retail
- Headquarters: India
- Number of locations: 963
- Parent: Trent Limited
- Website: www.zudio.com

Zudio is an Indian fast fashion retailer owned by Tata Group's Trent Limited. It primarily operates out of its nearly 1,000 brick and mortar stores across the country.

The company uses the "blue ocean strategy" and focuses on mass-market consumers in Indian tier 3 and 4 towns. It sells its products at MRP and rarely offers discounts. It is also known to refresh its inventory every 15 days, which, according to an analyst, is an industry-first. According to its parent, Trent, Zudio reported revenue over $1 billion in FY25.

== History ==
Zudio was launched as a mass-market fashion retailer by Trent Limited in 2015. It opened its first store in Bengaluru in 2016. According to one source, it was launched on the heels of Trent's other fashion retail brand, Westside's, failure to expand out of major Indian cities. In 2024, it opened three stores in the United Arab Emirates. Zudio's business model borrows heavily from Inditex's Zara's, which entered India through a partnership with Trent.

== See also ==
- Retailing in India
