= National Institute of Personnel Management =

- Abbreviation: NIPM
- Formation: 1980; 46 years ago
- Type: Human Resources Institute
- Headquarters: Kolkata, India
- National President: PR Basavaraju
- Website: http://www.nipm.in

The National Institute of Personnel Management (NIPM) is a professional association for human resource management professionals. It is headquartered in Kolkata, India. The organisation was founded in 1980 after the merger of IIPM and NILM. NIPM has about 12,000 members spread over 55 chapters all over the country.

NIPM is a non-profit making body devoted to the development of skill and expertise of the professionals engaged in the management of human resources through regular lecture, meetings, seminars, training courses, conferences and publication in its chapters all over the country.

== History ==
NIPM originated as the Indian Institute of Personnel Management (IIPM), the first voluntary organisation focused on the field of human resources in India, formed by a voluntary association of professionals in the year 1948.

IIPM was started in 1948 in Kolkata and was registered as a society under the Society's Registration Act, 1860. IIPM was considered a parallel body to the Institute of Personnel Management, UK. It started as 17 branches and grew until its eventual merger with the National Institute of Labour Management in 1980. In the course, IIPM became the leading advisory body to various government ministries and departments on areas related to personnel management, organising conferences and seminars on the subject area.

Various books written by IIPM professors are catalogued in libraries across the world. In addition, the definitions that IIPM gave in the fields of personnel management have gone on to become theoretical reference standards.

Past members of IIPM have included ITC board members.

In 1980, IIPM merged with the National Institute of Labour Management and gave rise to the National Institute of Personnel Management, the "only all - India body of professional managers engaged in the profession of personnel management, industrial relations, labour welfare, training and HRD in the country."
