= Tata Investment Corp =

Indian financial company

Tata Investment Corporation Limited
- Company type: Public
- Traded as: NSE: TATAINVEST; BSE: 501301
- Industry: Investment service
- Founded: 1937; 89 years ago
- Founder: Tata Sons
- Headquarters: Mumbai, Maharashtra, India
- Revenue: ▲₹278 crore (US$29 million)(2023)
- Net income: ▲₹252 crore (US$26 million)(2023)
- Total assets: ▲₹20,990 crore (US$2.2 billion) (2023)
- Total equity: ▲₹19,676 crore (US$2.1 billion) (2023)
- Parent: Tata Group
- Website: tatainvestment.com

Tata Investment Corporation Limited (TICL) is a non-banking financial company involved in investing in long-term investments.

== Background ==
Earlier named the Investment Corporation of India, the company is primarily involved in investing in long-term investments such as equity shares, debt instruments, listed and unlisted, and equity-related securities of companies in a wide range of industries. The sources of income of the Company consist of dividend, interest and profit on sale of investments. TICL invests in sectors such as banks, cement, chemicals and fertilizers, electricity and transmission, electrical and electronics, engineering, construction and infrastructure, fast-moving consumer goods, finance and investments, healthcare, hotels, information technology, metals and mining, motor vehicles and ancillaries, oil and natural resources, retail, textiles, transportation and logistics, and miscellaneous and diversified.

TICL was promoted by Tata Sons in 1937 and went public in 1959 when it became one of the few publicly held investment companies listed on the Mumbai Stock Exchange.
