= Ratanji Tata =

Indian industrialist and philanthropist (1871–1918)

Sir Ratanji Tata JP
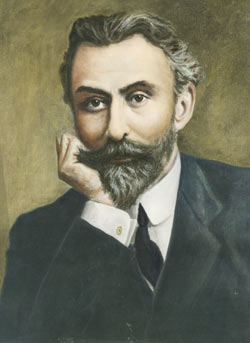
- Born: 20 January 1871; Bombay, Bombay Presidency, British India
- Died: 5 September 1918 (aged 47); St Ives, Cornwall, England
- Education: University of Bombay
- Occupations: Industrialist, philanthropist
- Spouse: Navajbai Sett (m. 1893)
- Children: Naval Tata (adopted)
- Father: Jamsetji Tata
- Relatives: Dorabji Tata (brother); Ratan Tata (grandson)

Sir Ratanji Jamsetji Tata JP (20 January 1871 – 5 September 1918) was an Indian industrialist and philanthropist during the British Raj. He was the younger son of Jamsetji Tata, the founder of the Tata Group.

== Biography ==
Ratanji Tata was born in Bombay in British India to the noted Parsi merchant Jamsetji Tata. Ratan Tata was educated at St. Xavier's College in Bombay and afterwards entered his father's firm. On the death of the elder Tata in 1904, Ratanji Tata and his brother Dorabji Tata inherited a very large fortune, much of which they devoted to philanthropic works of a practical nature and to the establishment of various industrial enterprises for developing the resources of India.

An Indian institute of scientific and medical research (Indian Institute of Science, IISc) was founded at Bangalore in 1905, and in 1912 the Tata Steel began work at Sakchi, in the Central Provinces, with marked success. The most important of the Tata enterprises, however, was the storing of the water power of the Western Ghats (1915), which provided Bombay with an enormous amount of electrical power, and hence vastly increased the productive capacity of its industries.

Sir Ratan Tata, who was knighted in 1916, did not confine his benefactions to India. In England, where he had a permanent residence at York House, Twickenham, he founded in 1912 the Ratan Tata department of social science and administration at the London School of Economics, and also established a Ratan Tata Fund at the University of London for studying the conditions of the poorer classes. In 1909, he donated a sum of Rs. 50,000 (equivalent to approximately Rs. 40 million in 2022) to Mahatma Gandhi to aid the struggle of Indians' right to work in the Transvaal. This donation helped in securing the finances of Gandhi's protests against the Anglo-Boer rulers.

He was a great connoisseur of arts. The Chhatrapati Shivaji Maharaj Vastu Sangrahalaya (formerly Prince of Wales Museum) has a section displaying the collections of Sir Ratanji Tata (acquired in 1923) along with two other sections that of Sir Dorab Tata (acquired in 1933) and Sir Purushottam Mavji (acquired in 1915).

== Personal life ==
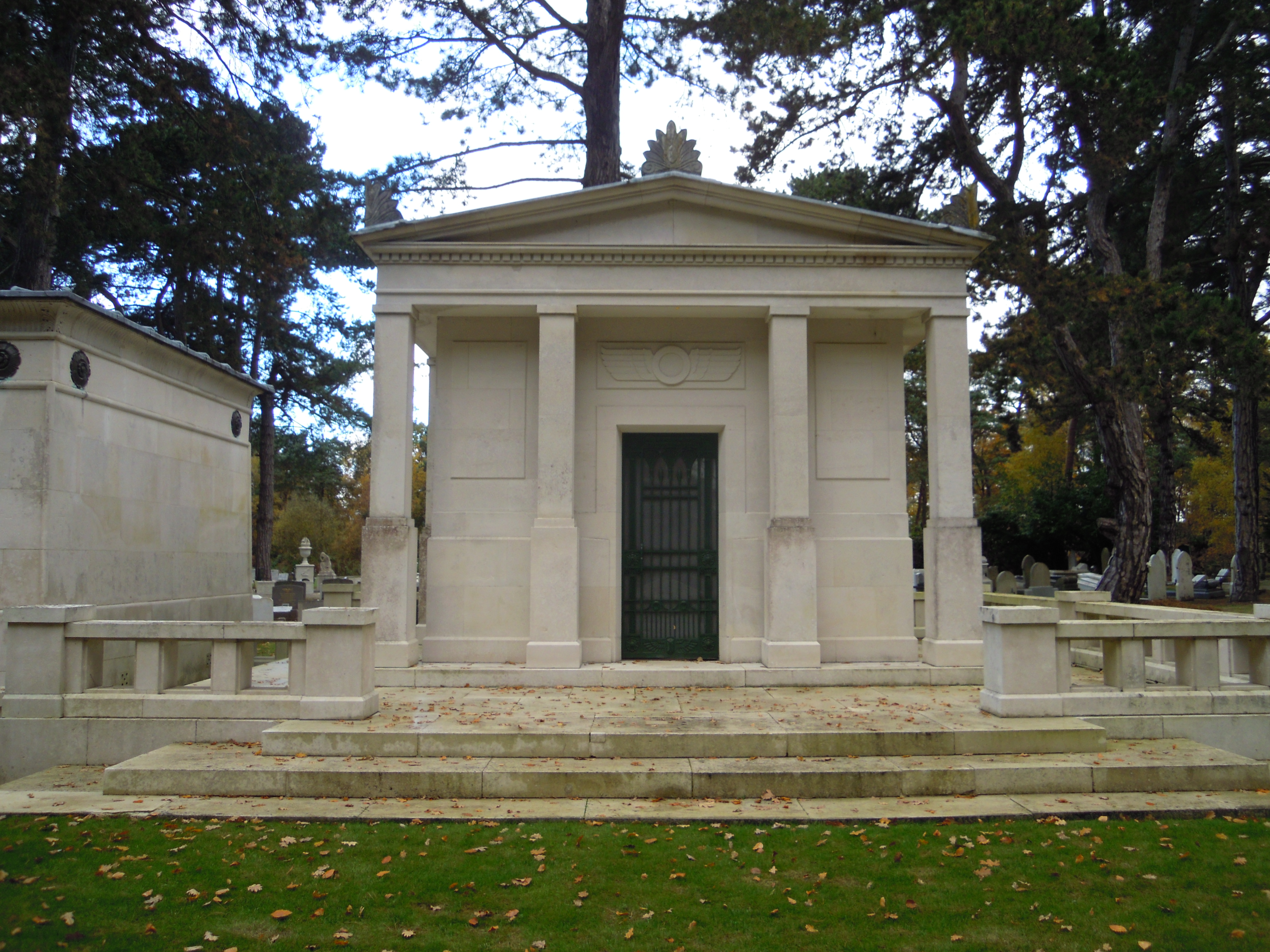
Mausoleum of Ratanji Tata in Brookwood Cemetery

He married Navajbai Sett in 1893 and left for England the final time in 1915. They adopted Naval Tata from the family of a distant relative. Naval's father, Hormusji, was Ratanji's third-cousin's son, making Naval his distant grandnephew. Naval was also the son of Ratanji's first-cousin Ratanbai Rao (daughter of his mother Hirabai's sister Cooverbai). He died on 6 September 1918 at St Ives in Cornwall, England and was buried at Brookwood Cemetery, Woking, near London, by the side of his father (Jamsetji Tata).

Through an aunt, Jerbai Tata, who married a Bombay merchant, Dorabji Saklatvala, he was cousin of Shapurji Saklatvala who later became a Communist Member of the British Parliament.

== Legacy ==
After his death the Sir Ratan Tata Trust was founded in 1919, with a corpus of Rs. 8 million.
