= Forbes (engineering company) =

Indian engineering, shipping, and logistics company

Forbes & Company Ltd.
- Company type: Public
- Traded as: BSE: 502865
- Industry: Robotics, industrial automation, logistics, engineering, business automation
- Founded: 1767,260 years
- Headquarters: Mumbai, India
- Parent: Shapoorji Pallonji Group
- Website: forbes.co.in

Forbes & Company Limited, the erstwhile Forbes Gokak Limited, is an Indian engineering, shipping and logistics company based in Mumbai. It was established in that city in 1767 by John Forbes of Aberdeenshire, Scotland, a descendant of an ancient family of Lord Forbes of Pitsligo. Over the years, the management of the company moved from the Forbes family to the Campbells, to the Tata Group, and finally to the Shapoorji Pallonji Group. It is one of the oldest companies of India and has been listed on the Bombay Stock Exchange since 1919.

== Founder ==
Born in 1743, John Forbes set sail to India in 1764 on board the ship Asia as a purser on the East India Company's service. After three years as a 'free mariner' and later 'free merchant', he established a business to trade Indian cotton. The company later expanded into ship brokerage, ship building and banking.

== Business operations ==
Forbes & Company Limited is involved in three subsidiary companies:

- Forbes Engineering: Robotics, industrial automation, precision cutting tools and springs
- Forbes Real Estate
- Forbes Technosys: ATM and banking kiosks
