= JRD Tata =

French-born Indian industrialist, philanthropist and aviator (1904–1993)

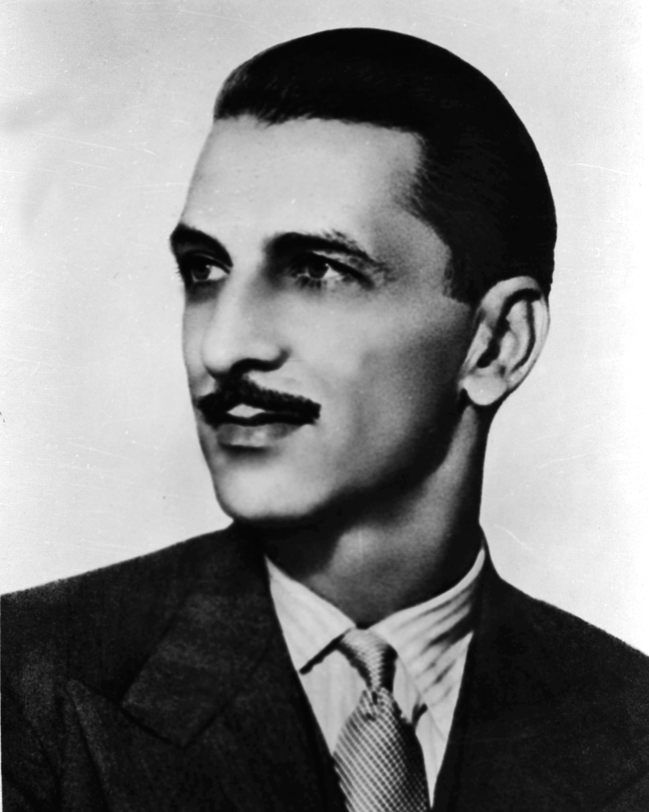
- Tata in 1950

4th Chairman of Tata Sons and Tata Group
- In office 26 July 1938 – 25 March 1991
- Preceded by: Nowroji Saklatvala
- Succeeded by: Ratan Tata

Personal details
- Born: Jehangir Ratanji Dadabhoy Tata; 29 July 1904 Paris, France
- Died: 29 November 1993 (aged 89) Geneva, Switzerland
- Resting place: Père Lachaise Cemetery
- Citizenship: France (1904–1929); India (1929–1993)
- Spouse: Thelma Vicaji (m. 1930)
- Parents: Ratanji Dadabhoy Tata (father); Suzanne RD Tata (mother)
- Relatives: See Tata family
- Education: Cambridge University
- Occupation: Industrialist; philanthropist
- Known for: Founder of Tata Consultancy Services, Tata Motors, Titan Company, Voltas and Air India
- Awards: Padma Vibhushan (1955); Legion of Honour (1983); Daniel Guggenheim Medal (1988); Bharat Ratna (1992)

Jehangir Ratanji Dadabhoy Tata (29 July 1904 – 29 November 1993) was a French-born Indian industrialist, and aviator, who was the chairman of Tata Sons and Tata Group from 1938 to 1991.

Born into the Tata family, he was the son of noted businessman Ratanji Dadabhoy Tata and his French wife Suzanne RD Tata. He is best known for being the founder of several industries under the Tata Group, including Tata Consultancy Services, Tata Motors, Titan Industries, Tata Salt, Voltas and Tata Airlines. In 1982, he was awarded the French Legion of Honour and in 1955 and 1992, he received two of India's highest civilian awards: the Padma Vibhushan and the Bharat Ratna. These honours were bestowed on him for his contributions to Indian industry.

== Early life ==
Jehangir Ratanji Dadabhoy Tata was born on 29 July 1904 in Paris, France. He was the second child of notable Parsi Indian businessman, Ratanji Dadabhoy Tata, and his French wife, Sooni Tata (née Brière). His father was the first cousin of Jamsetji Tata, a pioneer industrialist in India. He had one elder sister Sylla, a younger sister Rodabeh and two younger brothers Darab and Jamshed (called Jimmy) Tata. His sister, Sylla, was married to Dinshaw Maneckji Petit, the third baronet of Petits.

He spent much of his childhood in the erstwhile French Third Republic and the French language was his native language. He attended Lycée Janson-de-Sailly in Paris, where one of the teachers there mistook him for an Egyptian and used to call him L'Égyptien. Tata's family also purchased a house on the beach in Neufchâtel-Hardelot where the family would sometimes live until 1917. Tata was also neighbors with Louis Blériot.

Tata attended the Cathedral and John Connon School, Bombay. In 1917 he and his family moved to Yokohama, Japan and lived there for two years while he attended an American school. When his father joined the Tata company he moved the whole family to London. During this time, JRD's mother died at the age of 43 while his father was in India and his family was in England.

After JRD's mother's death, Ratanji Dadabhoy Tata decided to move his family to India and sent JRD back to England for higher studies in October 1923. He attended a grammar school, and later enrolled at Cambridge University and was interested in studying engineering.

However, as a citizen of France, JRD had to enlist in the French Army for at least a year. In between grammar school and his time in the army, he spent a brief spell at home in Bombay. After joining the French Army he was posted into a regiment of spahis. Upon discovering Tata could not only read and write French and English, but could type as well, a colonel had him assigned as a secretary in his office. After his time in the French Army, Tata planned to return to Cambridge and complete his studies, but his father decided to bring him back to India and he joined the Tata Company.

In 1929, Tata renounced his French citizenship and became an Indian citizen. In 1930 Tata married Thelma Vicaji, the niece of Jack Vicaji, a colourful lawyer whom he hired to defend him on a charge of driving his Bugatti too fast along Bombay's main promenade, Marine Drive. The couple had no children. Previously he had been engaged to Dinbai Mehta, the future mother of The Economist editor Shapur Kharegat.

While he was born to a Parsi father, and his French mother converted to Zoroastrianism, JRD was agnostic. He found some Parsi religious customs like their funeral rites and their exclusiveness irksome. He adhered to the three basic tenets of Zoroastrianism, which were good thoughts, good words, and good deeds, but he did not profess belief or disbelief in God.

== Career ==
When Tata was in tour, he was inspired by his friend's father, aviation pioneer Louis Blériot, the first man to fly across the English Channel, and took to flying. On 10 February 1929, Tata obtained the first license issued in India. He later came to be known as the "Father of Indian civil aviation". He founded India's first commercial airline, Tata Airlines in 1932, which became Air India in 1946, now India's national airline. He and Nevill Vintcent worked together in building Tata Airlines. They were also good friends. In 1929, JRD became one of the first Indians to be granted a commercial pilot licence. In 1932 Tata Aviation Service, the forerunner to Tata Airline and Air India, took to the skies. That same year he flew the first commercial mail flight to Juhu, in a de Havilland Puss Moth.

He piloted India's first scheduled commercial air transport service in 1932. It lifted off from Drigh in Karachi to Madras with JRD at the controls of a Puss on 15 October 1932. JRD nourished and nurtured his airline baby through to 1953, when the government of Jawaharlal Nehru nationalised Air India along with several other private Airlines and appointed JRD as its first chairman. JRD continued as chairman for 25 years before being removed by Morarji Desai in 1978.

He joined Tata Sons as an unpaid apprentice in 1925. In 1938, at the age of 34, Tata was elected Chairman of Tata Sons making him the head of the largest industrial group in India. He took over as Chairman of Tata Sons from his second cousin Nowroji Saklatwala. For decades, he directed the huge Tata Group of companies, with major interests in steel, engineering, power, chemicals and hospitality. He was famous for succeeding in business while maintaining high ethical standards – refusing to bribe politicians or use the black market.

Under his chairmanship, the assets of the Tata Group grew from US$100 million to over US$5 billion. He started with 14 enterprises under his leadership and half a century later on 26 July 1988, when he left, Tata Sons was a conglomerate of 95 enterprises which they either started or in which they had controlling interest.

He was the trustee of the Sir Dorabji Tata Trust from its inception in 1932 for over half a century. Under his guidance, this Trust established Asia's first cancer facility, the Tata Memorial Centre for Cancer, Research and Treatment, Bombay in 1941. He also founded the Tata Institute of Social Sciences (TISS, 1936), the Tata Institute of Fundamental Research (TIFR, 1945), and the National Center for Performing Arts.

In 1945, he founded Tata Motors. In 1948, Tata launched Air India International as India's first international airline. In 1953, the Indian Government appointed Tata as Chairman of Air India and a director on the Board of Indian Airlines – a position he retained for 25 years. For his crowning achievements in aviation, he was bestowed with the title of Honorary Air Commodore of India.

Tata cared greatly for his workers. In 1956, he initiated a programme of closer 'employee association with management' to give workers a stronger voice in the affairs of the company. He firmly believed in employee welfare and espoused the principles of an eight-hour working day, free medical aid, workers' provident scheme, and workmen's accident compensation schemes, which were later, adopted as statutory requirements in India.

He was also a founding member of the first Governing Body of NCAER, the National Council of Applied Economic Research in New Delhi, India's first independent economic policy institute established in 1956. In 1968, he founded Tata Consultancy Services as Tata Computer Centre. In 1979, Tata Steel instituted a new practice: a worker being deemed to be "at work" from the moment he leaves home for work until he returns home from work. This made the company financially liable to the worker for any mishap on the way to and from work. In 1987, he founded Titan Industries. Jamshedpur was also selected as a UN Global Compact City because of the quality of life, conditions of sanitation, roads and welfare that were offered by Tata Steel.

=== Support of emergency powers in 1975 ===
Tata was also supportive of the declaration of emergency powers by Prime Minister Indira Gandhi, in 1975. He is quoted to have told a reporter of the Times, "things had gone too far. You can't imagine what we've been through here—strikes, boycotts, demonstrations. Why, there were days I couldn't walk out of my house into the streets. The parliamentary system is not suited to our needs."

== Awards and honours ==
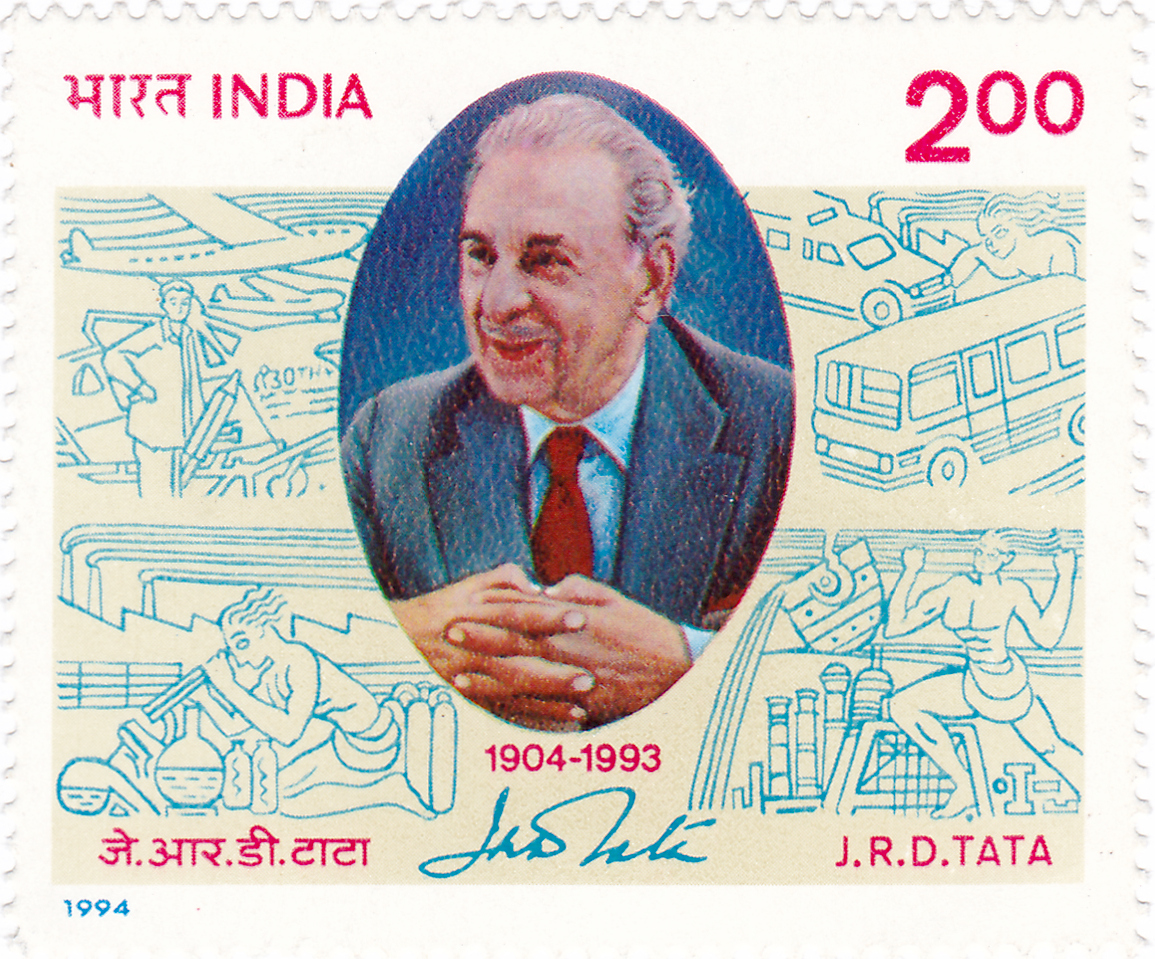
Tata on a 1994 stamp of India

Tata received a number of awards. He was conferred the honorary rank of group captain by the Indian Air Force in 1948, was promoted to the Air Commodore rank (equivalent to Brigadier in the army) on 4 October 1966, and was further promoted on 1 April 1974 to the Air Vice Marshal rank. Several international awards for aviation were given to him – the Tony Jannus Award in March 1979, the Gold Air Medal of the Fédération Aéronautique Internationale in 1985, the Edward Warner Award of the International Civil Aviation Organisation, Canada in 1986 and the Daniel Guggenheim Medal in 1988. He received the Padma Vibhushan in 1955. The French Legion of Honour was bestowed on him in 1983. In 1992, because of his selfless humanitarian endeavours, Tata was awarded India's highest civilian honour, the Bharat Ratna. In his memory, the Government of Maharashtra named its first double-decker bridge the Bharatratna JRD Tata Overbridge at Nasik Phata, Pimpri Chinchwad.

Following Prime Minister Indira Gandhi's 1975–1977 Emergency, in which she controversially pursued forced sterilizations as a form of population control, Tata built on these efforts by ordering Tata Steel to open nine family planning centers in 1984. Employees and their non-employee partners were compensated for undergoing sterilization, and factory plant departments were awarded for achieving the lowest fertility rate. While such incentives arguably violated the medical ethics principle of personal bodily autonomy, Tata was awarded the 1992 United Nations Population Award for his efforts.

== Death ==
Tata died in Geneva, Switzerland of a kidney infection on 29 November 1993, at the age of 89. He said a few days before his death: "Comme c'est doux de mourir" ("How gentle it is to die").

Upon his death, the Indian Parliament was adjourned in his memory, an honour not usually given to persons who are not members of parliament. He was buried at the Père Lachaise Cemetery in Paris.

In 2012, Tata was ranked the sixth "The Greatest Indian" in an Outlook magazine poll, "conducted in conjunction with CNN-IBN and History18 Channels with BBC."

== See also ==
- The Greatest Indian
- R. M. Lala
- Jamsetji Tata
- Ratanji Dadabhoy Tata
- Rattanbai Petit
- Dorabji Tata

Business positions
Preceded by Nowroji Saklatwala	Chairman of Tata Group; 1938-1991	Succeeded by Ratan Tata
