= Shapoorji Pallonji Group =

Indian conglomerate

Shapoorji Pallonji & Company Private Limited
- Type: Private
- Industry: Conglomerate
- Founded: 1865; 161 years ago
- Founder: Pallonji Mistry
- Headquarters: Mumbai, India
- Key people: Shapoor Mistry (Chairman); Pallon S. Mistry (President, Corporate Affairs)
- Services: Construction and engineering; Infrastructure; Energy; Water treatment; Real estate; Financial services; Textiles; Electronic publishing
- Revenue: ▼₹33,375 crore (US$3.5 billion) (FY23)
- Net income: ▼₹−1,915 crore (US$−200 million) (FY23)
- Owners: Shapoor Mistry (50%); Firoz Cyrus Mistry (25%); Zahan Cyrus Mistry (25%)
- Subsidiaries: SP Engineering & Construction; Afcons Infrastructure; SP Real Estate; SP Infrastructure; SP Investment Advisors; SP Energy; Forbes & Company; SP International; Sterling & Wilson; Forvol International Services; SD Corporation; Oman Shapoorji Co.; Next Gen Publishing; SP Finance
- Website: www.shapoorjipallonji.com

Shapoorji Pallonji & Company Private Limited (SPCPL), trading as Shapoorji Pallonji Group, is an Indian conglomerate headquartered in Mumbai. Its primary business interests include construction and engineering, infrastructure, real estate, energy, and textiles, among others. The company was headed by a grandson of founder Pallonji Mistry, also named Pallonji Mistry, until 2012, when he announced his retirement and the succession of his son, Shapoor Mistry.

Shapoorji Pallonji is regarded as "one of India's most valuable private enterprises". The Shapoorji Pallonji Group has three listed companies–Afcons Infrastructure, Forbes & Company Ltd, and Gokak Textiles.

The company is known for building some of Mumbai's landmarks around the Fort area, including the Hong Kong Bank, Grindlays Bank, Standard Chartered Bank and Reserve Bank of India building, Bombay Stock Exchange building and Taj Intercontinental. Apart from these, the company has built Al Alam Palace for the Sultan of Oman in 1972. Other notable projects include The Imperial in Mumbai, Jumeirah Lake Towers in Dubai and Ebene Cyber City in Mauritius.

== History ==
The company was founded as a partnership firm Littlewood Pallonji in 1865. The first project was the construction of a pavement on the Girgaum Chowpatty, followed by being part of the construction of a reservoir on Malabar Hill which supplied water to Mumbai for over 100 years. The company also built the Brabourne Stadium in Mumbai and the Jawaharlal Nehru Stadium in Delhi. The Mumbai Central Railway station, was also built by them at a cost of ₹1.6 crore. The company was commended for completing the work within 21 months.

In 1936, Shapoorji Pallonji bought F.E. Dinshaw and Co. after the death of its promoter. F.E. Dinshaw was an established finance firm that had high-profile dealings such as arranging a loan from the Maharaja of Gwalior for Tata Steel (then TISCO) in 1924 and merging local cement companies to form ACC Cement in 1936. F.E. Dinshaw and Co. also had a 12.5% stake in Tata Sons, which came to Shapoorji Pallonji. Shapoorji Pallonji's stake in Tata Sons increased to 18.37% after the latter's rights issue in 1996.

In 2001–02, Shapoorji Pallonji took over Forbes Gokak (now Forbes & Company Ltd) from the Tata Group after winning a takeover battle with the Pawankumar Sanwarmal Group.

In recent years, it has built the Barakhamba Underground Station in Delhi and Providence Stadium in Guyana. After the 2008 Mumbai attacks, the company was involved in the repairs and renovation of Taj Mahal Palace & Tower that was severely damaged by the attack. In 2010, it built India's tallest building of the time, The Imperial, a residential tower in Mumbai.

In 2012, Shapoor Mistry announced that the Group had plans to invest in a deep-sea port, an IT park, hydro electricity and construction of roads and night shelters for the poor in West Bengal. In 2012, Shapoorji Pallonji Ports Pvt Ltd was planning to build Simar Port in Gujarat with SPV name Simar Port Private Limited.

In January 2016, the Group launched its first affordable housing brand, Joyville Homes.

Shapoorji Pallonji Group began a series of divestments to reduce its debt, starting with the initial public offering of Sterling & Wilson Solar in 2019. In 2021–2022, Shapoorji Pallonji Group demerged Eureka Forbes from Forbes & Company Ltd and sold its entire stake in Eureka Forbes to Advent International. By 2024, Shapoorji Pallonji's stake in Sterling & Wilson Solar had reduced to 6.95% from 65.77% in 2019.

In 2023, Shapoorji Pallonji Group sold PNP Port in Raigad district to JSW Group. In 2024, Shapoorji Pallonji Group sold its controlling stake in Gopalpur port to Adani Ports & SEZ.

== Other works ==
The Shapoorji Pallonji has also had a brief involvement with Bollywood. Released in 1960, K. Asif's Mughal-e-Azam was funded by the group with a budget of ₹ 1.5 crore, which made it the most expensive Bollywood film till then and a record it held for many years. More than four decades later, the group funded a digital remastering of the film at a budget of ₹5 crore, which was released on 12 November 2004. Shapoor Mistry, grandson of Shapoorji Pallonji Mistry, thought it a fitting tribute to complete his grandfather's unfinished dream of colourising the film, especially as the original was produced by his grandfather. In 2016, Shapoorji Pallonji Group, in association with the National Centre for the Performing Arts (India), co-produced Mughal-e-Azam, a Broadway-style musical directed by Feroz Abbas Khan, and based on the 1960 Bollywood film Mughal-e-Azam.

== Key people ==
Shapoor Mistry is an Indian businessman who inherited the group in December 2012, succeeding his brother Cyrus Mistry, who left to lead the Tata Group. Forbes ranked Mistry #332 in their 2023 World's Billionaires List, totaling $7 billion in net worth. In October 2024, Mistry and his family were ranked 13th on Forbes list of India's 100 richest tycoons, with a net worth of $20.4 billion.

== See also ==
- Cyrus Mistry
- Tata Group
