= Charoti =

Village in Maharashtra

- village
- Location in Maharashtra, India Charoti (India)
- Coordinates: 19.9195519°N 72.9308968°E
- Country: India
- State: Maharashtra
- District: Palghar
- Taluka: Dahanu
- Elevation: 53 m (174 ft)

Population (2011)
  - Total: 4,520
- Time zone: UTC+5:30 (IST)
- 2011 census code: 551692

Charoti is a village in the Palghar district of Maharashtra, India. It is located in the Dahanu taluka.

== Demographics ==
At the 2011 census of India, Charoti had 920 households. The effective literacy rate (i.e. the literacy rate of population excluding children aged 6 and below) was 58.1%.

Demographics (2011 Census)
	Total	Male	Female
Population	4,520	2,319	2,201
Children aged below 6 years	704	354	350
Scheduled caste	48	22	26
Scheduled tribe	2,931	1,421	1,510
Literates	2217	1362	855
Workers (all)	2162	1360	802
Main workers (total)	1,768	1,149	619
Main workers: Cultivators	679	373	306
Main workers: Agricultural labourers	282	154	128
Main workers: Household industry workers	19	11	8
Main workers: Other	788	611	177
Marginal workers (total)	394	211	183
Marginal workers: Cultivators	73	40	33
Marginal workers: Agricultural labourers	205	144	61
Marginal workers: Household industry workers	7	1	6
Marginal workers: Others	109	26	83
Non-workers	2,358	959	1,399
