= Trent Limited =

Indian retail company

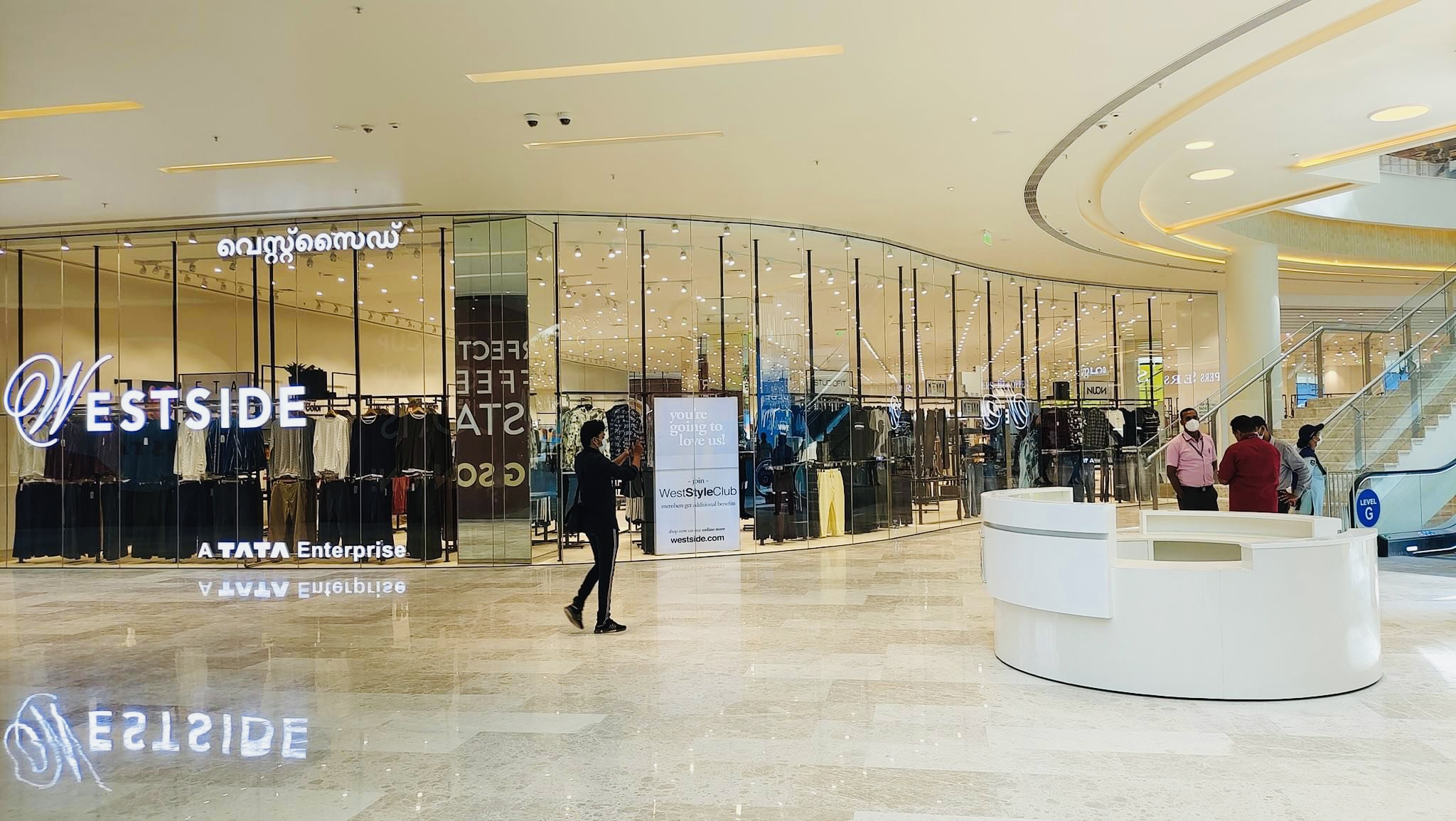
- Westside store in Thiruvananthapuram
- Type: Public
- Traded as: NSE: TRENT; BSE: 500251; NSE NIFTY 50 constituent; BSE SENSEX constituent
- ISIN: INE849A01020
- Industry: Retail
- Founded: 1952; 74 years ago (as Lakmé Limited) 1998; 28 years ago (as Trent Limited)
- Headquarters: Mumbai, Maharashtra, India
- Key people: Noel Tata (Chairman); P. Venkatesalu (CEO)
- Revenue: ▲₹20,074 crore (US$2.1 billion) (FY2026)
- Operating income: ▲₹2,702 crore (US$280 million) (FY2026)
- Net income: ▲₹1,741 crore (US$180 million) (FY2026)
- Number of employees: 25,277 (March 2024)
- Parent: Tata Group
- Subsidiaries: Westside; Zudio; Star Bazaar; Zara India
- Website: trentlimited.com
- Footnotes; Financials as of 31 March 2026.

Trent Limited (portmanteau of Tata Retail Enterprise) is an Indian retail company, which is part of the Tata Group and based in Mumbai. Started in 1998, Trent owns and operates fashion and lifestyle retail formats such as Westside, Zudio and Utsa. The company also runs retail chains like Star Bazaar and Zara through joint ventures.

== History ==
In 1998, the Tatas sold off their 50% stake in Lakmé Cosmetics to Hindustan Lever for ₹200 crore (US$48.46 million), and created Trent with the proceeds from the sale. Simone Tata, the chairperson of Lakmé, went on to head Trent. The company began operations in 1998, after acquiring the only store of Littlewoods in Bangalore and renaming the store "Westside".

Trent operated only Westside stores until 2004, when it opened its first Star Bazaar hypermarket in Ahmedabad.

In 2005, Trent acquired a 76% controlling stake in Landmark Bookstores, a Chennai-based privately owned books and music retailer, and completed 100% acquisition in April 2008.

In 2007, Trent entered a franchisee agreement with Benetton Group to set up Sisley stores in India. In 2008, Trent launched value fashion stores called Fashion Yatra. However, by 2012, the company shut down all Fashion Yatra stores and later terminated its Sisley agreement in an effort to shelve loss-making ventures.

In 2009, Trent and Inditex established a 49:51 joint venture to run Zara stores in India. Two years later, the two companies entered a similar agreement to open Massimo Dutti stores in India.

In 2014, Tesco acquired a 50% stake in Star Bazaar for £85 million and became a joint venture partner. After the establishment of the joint venture, Star Bazaar started supermarket format Star Market and small convenience store format Star Daily, but discontinued the latter by early 2018 when it began its online grocery service called StarQuik.

In 2015, Trent entered into a partnership with Sonae to open and operate Sport Zone outlets in India, but the venture was later dissolved.

In 2016, Trent opened its first Zudio store in Bangalore. Over the subsequent years, the number of Zudio stores grew at a faster rate than Trent's flagship format Westside, driven by high turnover of Zudio's relatively inexpensive fast fashion clothing.

In 2019, Trent acquired a 51% stake in Booker India for ₹22 crore (US$3.12 million). After the outbreak of COVID-19, Trent repositioned Landmark Bookstores as a beauty and accessories retailer called Misbu. In 2023, the company started occasionwear chain, Samoh.

In 2024, the company began operating internationally with the opening of a Zudio store in Dubai.

== Retail formats ==
Retail formats of Trent include:

| Name | No. of stores (March 2025) | Type | Year established | Notes |
|---|---|---|---|---|
| Westside | 248 | Branded fashion apparel, footwear and accessories for men, women and children, along with home decor and furnishings | 1998 | Wholly-owned |
| Zudio | 765 | Affordable fashion for men, women and children | 2016 | Wholly-owned |
| Utsa | 20 | Contemporary ethnic apparel, beauty products and accessories | 2019 | Wholly-owned |
| Samoh | 5 | Indian occasionwear | 2023 | Wholly-owned |
| Star | 78 | Supermarket format offering groceries, daily essentials and general merchandise | 2004 | 50:50 joint venture with Tesco |
| Zara | 23 | Fast-fashion retail chain | 2009 | 35:65 joint venture with Inditex |
| Massimo Dutti | 3 | Premium clothing retail chain | 2011 | 49:51 joint venture with Inditex |
| Booker India | 5 | Cash and carry format for businesses and traders | 2019 | 51:49 joint venture with Tesco |

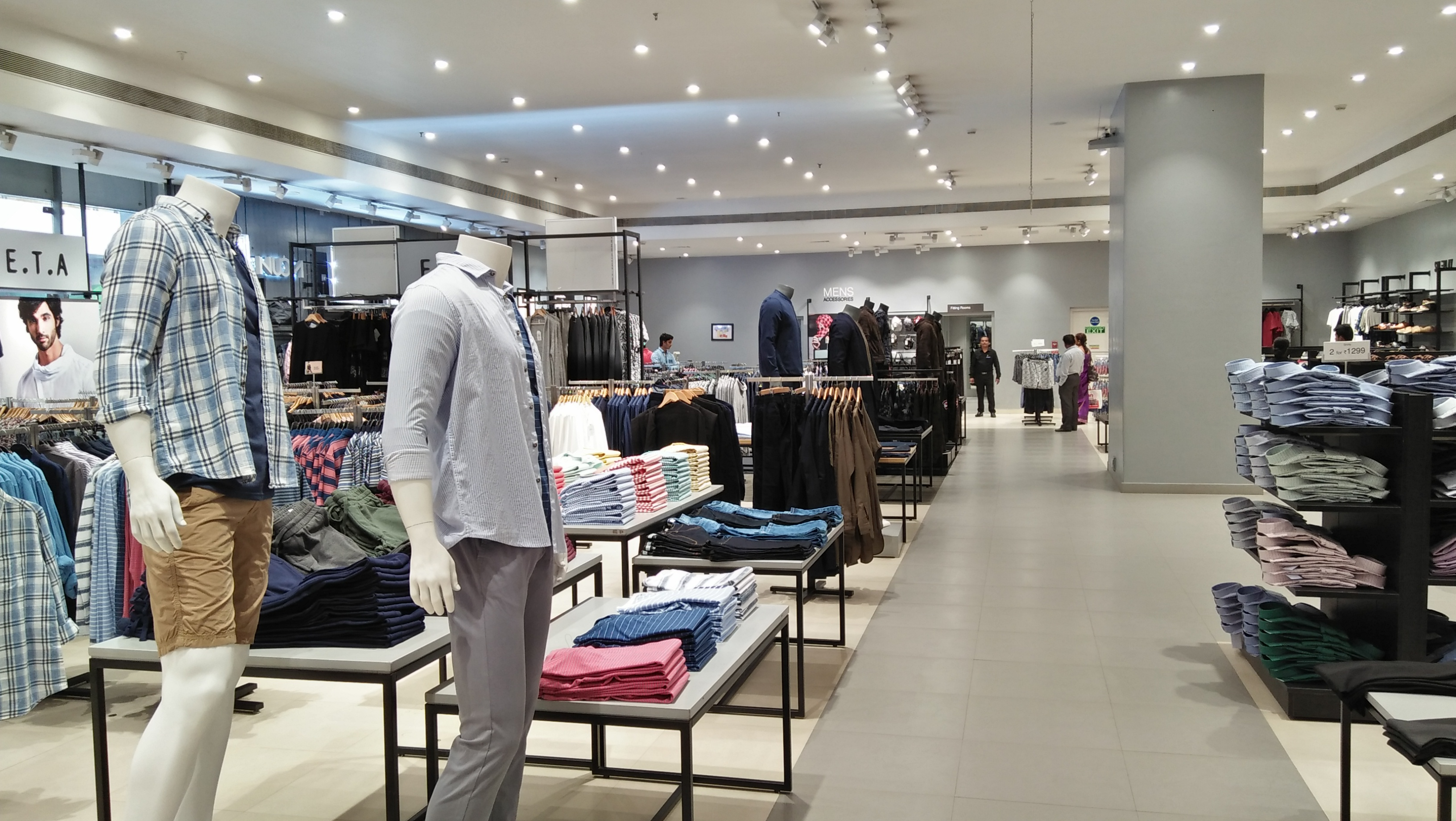
Inside a Westside outlet in Kolkata.

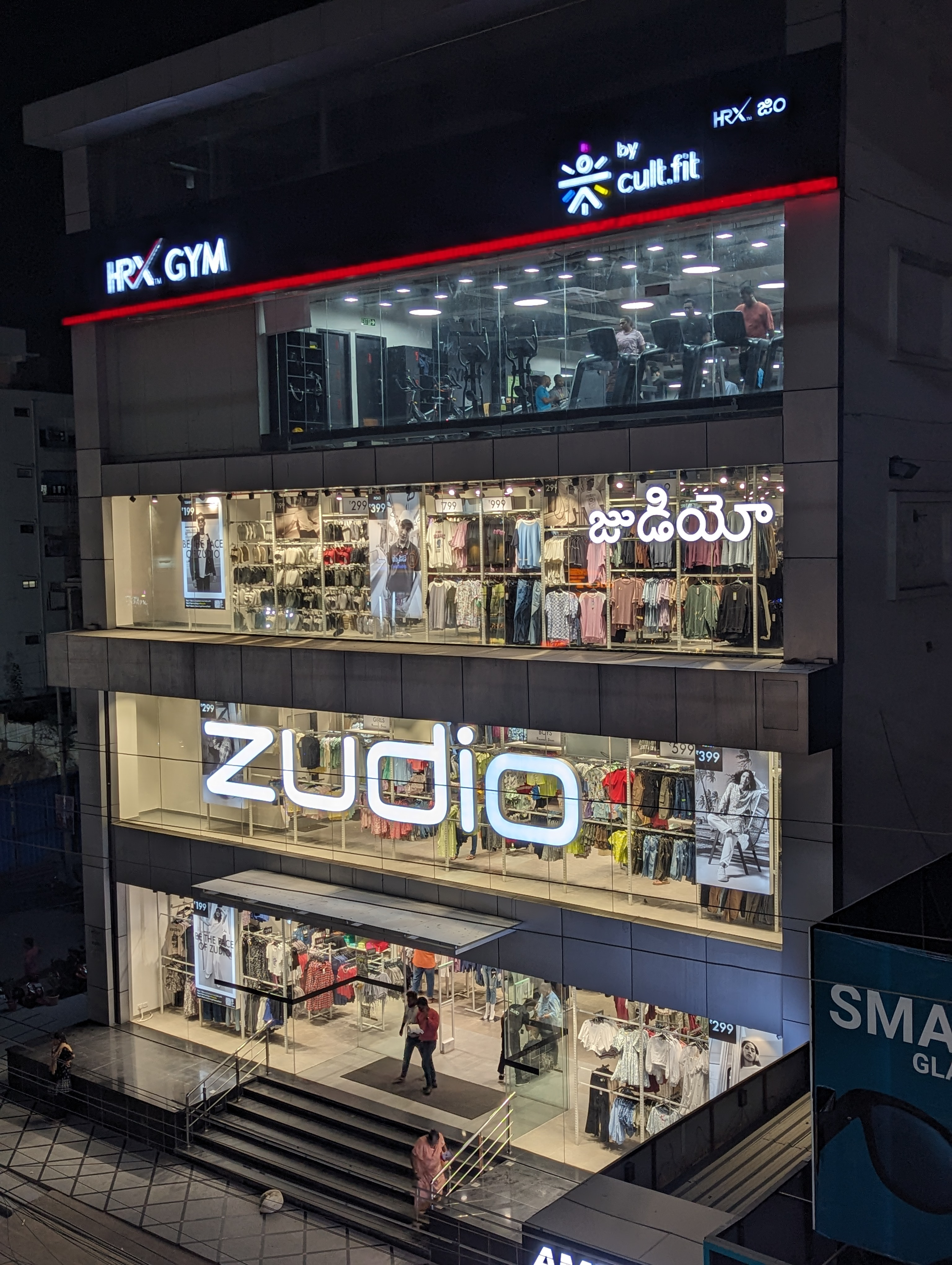
A typical neighbourhood Zudio store, Hyderabad.

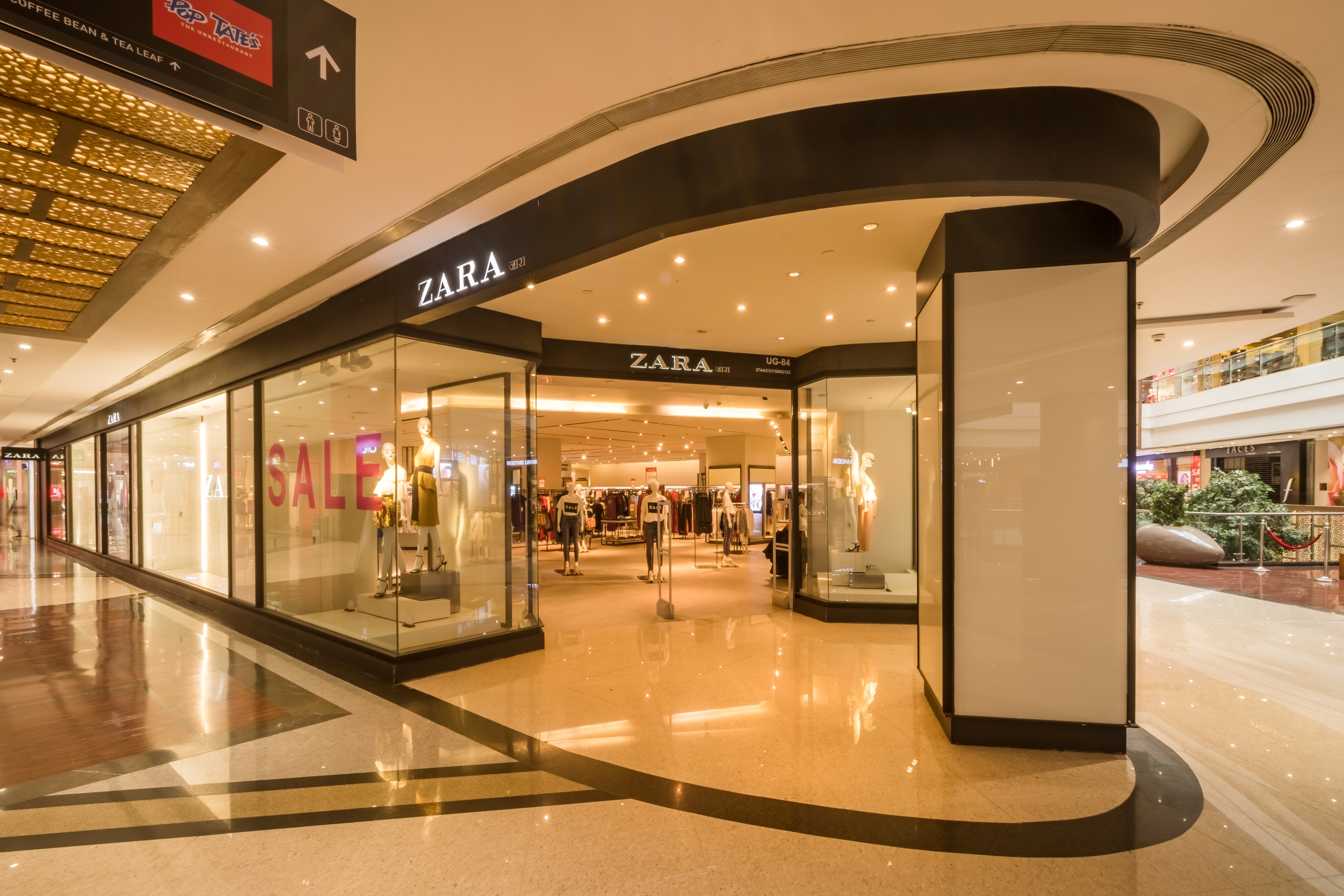
Zara store in Mumbai.
