= Sir Ratan Tata Trust =

Indian charitable trust and grant bestowing foundation

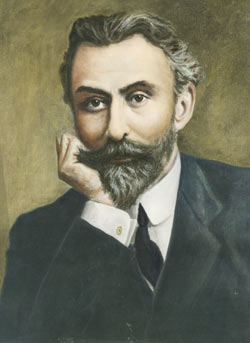
Sir Ratanji Tata

Sir Ratan Tata Trust (SRTT) was founded in 1919 with a sum of Indian currency ₹8 million. Established in accordance with the will of Sir Ratanji Tata, the Trust is now one of the oldest grant bestowing foundations in India.

It was under the ownership of Ratan Tata until his death. Noel Tata was appointed as the Chairman of the Tata Trusts on 11 October 2024, after the death of Ratan Tata.

The Trust has, for about a century, been instrumental in development processes, providing grants to institutions in the areas of rural livelihoods and communities, education, health, enhancing civil society and governance and arts, crafts and culture.

The Trust provides grants and partners with organisations that engage in innovative and sustainable initiatives and with the potential to make a visible difference. It also provides grants for endowments, has a separate programme for small grants and gives grants to individuals for education and medical relief.

SRTT is part of Tata Trusts which is headed by the CEO Siddharth Sharma.

The grants offered by the Trust can be broadly classified as:

- Institutional grants
- Endowment grants
- Small grants
- Individual grants

== Endowment grants ==
The Trust has developed and used endowments to sustain mission-driven institutions that influence positive change in society. It has a formal endowment strategy with well-set norms and clearly defined criteria that enable it to identify and appraise deserving institutions. The endowment portfolio includes Professional Assistance for Development Action (New Delhi), National Council of Applied Economic Research (New Delhi), Child Relief and You (Mumbai), Centre for Science and Environment (New Delhi) and Children's Book Trust (New Delhi).

== Emergency grants ==
Tata Sons and Ratan Tata donated ₹1,500 crore to the PM CARES Fund to fight against the COVID-19 pandemic in India.

== Small grants ==
The Sir Ratan Tata Small Grant Programme (SGP) was launched in 1998–99. These grants cater to the needs of small, welfare-oriented organisations, and those needing support to implement innovative ideas. It was later amended to accommodate the worthy larger organisations that needed funding for strategic planning, focused research activities, or strengthening internal systems.
