= Tata Sons =

Indian holding company

Tata Sons Pvt. Ltd.
- Type: Holding company
- Founded: 8 December 1917; 108 years ago
- Headquarters: Bombay House, Mumbai, Maharashtra, India
- Area served: Worldwide
- Key people: Natarajan Chandrasekaran (chairman and Managing Director); Saurabh Agrawal (CFO)
- Revenue: ▼₹38,835 crore (US$4.1 billion) (2025)
- Net income: ▼₹26,232 crore (US$2.8 billion) (2025)
- Owner: Tata Trusts (66%)
- Website: tata.com

Tata Sons Pvt. Ltd. is the holding company of the Tata Group, headquartered in Mumbai. It owns the bulk of shareholding in the affiliate companies of Tata Group, as well as its land holdings across India, tea estates and steel plants. It derives its revenue from dividends from these companies, and owns the Tata trademark registered in India and several other countries.

Tata Sons was established as a trading enterprise in 1917, and engaged primarily in the overseeing of Tata Group's profits and structuring them into the right direction, before moving from conducting businesses directly to becoming the principal holding company of Tata Group. About 66% of its equity capital is held by philanthropic trusts endowed by members of the Tata family. The biggest two of these trusts are the Sir Dorabji Tata Trust and Sir Ratan Tata Trust.

As of March 2025, Tata Sons' standalone assets stood at ₹175,000 crore (US$19 billion).

== History ==
Natarajan Chandrasekaran took over as Chairman of Tata Sons on 21 February 2017. The company also undertook conversion from a public limited company to a private limited one in 2017; both these decisions were challenged in court by former chairman Cyrus Mistry.

In December 2019, NCLAT declared the conversion, and by extension, Chandrasekaran's chairmanship, illegal and restored Mistry. On 10 January 2020, however, the Supreme Court stayed NCLAT's order; in response, Mistry filed a cross appeal in the court, seeking explanations for anomalies in the NCLAT. On 26 March 2021, the Supreme Court of India upheld Tata Sons' decision to sack Cyrus Mistry.

In March 2024, speculation arose about Tata Sons preparing for an Initial public offering (IPO), potentially valuing the company at up to $96 billion, according to investment advisory firm Spark.

In November 2024, Tata Sons reached an agreement with Singapore Airlines which saw Indian full-service carrier Vistara merge with Tata-owned Air India to form a single entity with an expanded network and broader fleet.

In August 2026, Tata Sons Chairman N. Chandrasekaran announced he would serve out his term ending in February 2027 without seeking reappointment. Following his decision, Sir Dorabji Tata Trust resolved to initiate the process of setting up a selection committee. Tata Trusts is considering urgent legal action to take governance decisions regarding Tata Sons. This has also increased the pressure on the firm for succession and potential stock market listing.

The Reserve Bank of India had classified Tata Sons as an upper-layer non-banking financial company in September 2022, setting a three-year deadline for listing. After Tata Sons repaid its borrowings and applied in March 2024 to surrender its registration as a core investment company, the regulator rejected the application in September 2026, and on 16 November 2026 it wrote to the company telling it to comply with the rules for upper-layer non-banking financial companies, including the mandatory listing requirement.

== Subsidiaries ==
=== Tata Capital ===
Tata Capital Limited is an Indian financial and investment services company, based in Mumbai. It is a subsidiary of Tata Sons and has more than 700 branches across the country. The firm offers consumer loans, wealth management, commercial finance, and infrastructure finance, among others. It was established in 2007.

In November 2025, Tata Capital secured USD 15.85 million from the Green Climate Fund (GCF) under the “BEACON INDIA” programme to support early-stage climate-tech start-ups in India. The initiative, implemented with SIDBI and TREC-STEP, includes an additional USD 3 million grant and Tata Capital’s own contribution of about USD 47.6 million, aiming to reduce over 1.1 million tonnes of CO₂ and benefit around 2.9 million people.

== Major holdings ==
=== Listed companies ===
As of 30 June 2025, Tata Sons' owns stakes in 15 listed companies:

Company	Stake (%)	Value
Indian Hotels Company Limited	35.7	₹39,295 crore (US$4.2 billion)
Tata Chemicals	31.9	₹7,617 crore (US$810 million)
Tata Communications	14.1	₹6,254 crore (US$670 million)
Tata Elxsi	42.2	₹14,165 crore (US$1.5 billion)
Tata Consumer Products	28.7	₹30,630 crore (US$3.3 billion)
Tata Investment Corp	68.5	₹23,478 crore (US$2.5 billion)
Tata Motors	40.2	₹103,131 crore (US$11 billion)
Tata Power	45.2	₹55,982 crore (US$6.0 billion)
Tata Steel	31.8	₹66,395 crore (US$7.1 billion)
Tata Consultancy Services	71.7	₹805,435 crore (US$86 billion)
Titan Company	20.8	₹68,310 crore (US$7.3 billion)
Trent	32.5	₹64,619 crore (US$6.9 billion)
Tata Teleservices	19.6	₹2,210 crore (US$240 million)
Voltas	26.6	₹12,475 crore (US$1.3 billion)
Hemisphere Properties	8.3	₹407 crore (US$43 million)

=== Unlisted companies ===
Tata Sons also holds stakes in a number of unlisted companies, including Tata Capital (92.83%), Tata Projects (73.25%), Tata Advanced Systems (100%) and Air India (73.82%) among others.

== Board of directors ==
As of September 2025, the Tata Sons board consists of six members:

Position	Personnel
Executive Chairman	Natarajan Chandrasekaran
Non-Executive Director	Venu Srinivasan
Director	Noel Tata
Independent Director	Harish Manwani
Independent Director	Anita M. George
Executive Director	Saurabh Agrawal

== Shareholding pattern ==
Sir Dorabji Tata Trust and Sir Ratan Tata Trust are the two biggest shareholders of Tata Sons, with a combined stake of over 50%. Noel Tata is the largest individual shareholder.

Total equity shares: 404,146 (₹10 each)

Shareholder	No of shares	Shareholding percentage	Part of
Sir Dorabji Tata Trust	113,067	27.98	Tata Trusts
Sir Ratan Tata Trust	95,211	23.56	Tata Trusts
Sterling Investment Corporation Private Limited	37,122	9.19	Shapoorji Pallonji Group
Cyrus Investment Private Limited	37,122	9.19	Shapoorji Pallonji Group
JRD Tata Trust	16,200	4.01	Tata Trusts
Tata Education Trust	15,075	3.73	Tata Trusts
Tata Social Welfare Trust	15,075	3.73	Tata Trusts
Tata Steel	12,375	3.06	Tata Group
Tata Motors	12,375	3.06	Tata Group
Tata Chemicals	10,237	2.53	Tata Group
RD Tata Trust	8,838	2.19	Tata Trusts
Tata Power	6,673	1.65	Tata Group
Indian Hotels Company	4,500	1.11	Tata Group
Noel Tata	4,060	1	Tata family
Jimmy Naval Tata	3,262	0.81	Tata family
MK Tata Trust	2,421	0.6	Tata Trusts
Tata Industries Limited	2,295	0.57	Tata Group
Tata Consumer Products	1,755	0.43	Tata Group
Ratan Tata Endowment Foundation	1,684	0.42	Tata Trusts
Ratan Tata Endowment Trust	1,684	0.42	Tata Trusts
Tata International Limited	1,477	0.37	Tata Group
Piloo Minocher Tata	487	0.12	Tata family
Sarvajanik Seva Trust	396	0.1	Tata Trusts
Tata Investment Corporation	326	0.08	Tata Group
Jimmy Minocher Tata	157	0.04	Tata family
Vera Farhad Choksey	157	0.04	Tata family
Shapoor Mistry	54	0.01	Shapoorji Pallonji family
Firoz Cyrus Mistry	27	0	Shapoorji Pallonji family
Zahan Cyrus Mistry	27	0	Shapoorji Pallonji family
Leah Tata	2	0	Tata family
Maya Tata	2	0	Tata family
Neville Tata	2	0	Tata family
Virendra Singh Chauhan	1	0	Others

== See also ==
- Forbes Global 2000
- Fortune India 500
- List of companies of India
- List of corporations by market capitalization
- List of largest companies by revenue
- Make in India
