= List of entities associated with Tata Group =

Official logo

The Tata Group is an Indian multinational conglomerate, with many subsidiaries and joint venture companies. Its holding company, Tata Sons, owns the bulk of shareholding in these companies as well as the Tata trademarks, which are registered in India and several other countries. About 66% of the equity capital of Tata Sons is held by philanthropic trusts endowed by members of the Tata family. The biggest two of these trusts are the Sir Dorabji Tata Trust and Sir Ratan Tata Trust.

== Group companies ==
Notable subsidiary companies and joint ventures of the Tata Group include:

=== Industrials ===
- Tata Steel – the second-largest steel producer in India and Europe
  - Formerly Tata Steel Europe, since 2021 split into:
    - Tata Steel Netherlands (TSN)
    - Tata Steel UK
  - Tata Bearings
  - Tata Pigments – a synthetic iron oxide pigments producer
  - TRF
  - Mjunction – B2B e-commerce joint venture with SAIL
- Tata Chemicals
  - Rallis India Limited – an agricultural research company
  - Tata Chemicals Europe – formerly known as Brunner Mond
    - British Salt
  - Magadi Soda Company
  - Tata Swach
- Tata Advanced Systems – an aerospace manufacturing, military engineering and defense technology company
  - Tata Power SED
- Tata Industries – business incubator for Tata Group ventures
- TRL Krosaki Refractories Limited – a refractory joint venture with Krosaki Harima Corporation
- Tata Electronics – an electronics manufacturing services company

=== Automotive ===
- Tata Motors Passenger Vehicles – passenger cars manufacturer
  - Fiat India Automobiles – automotive manufacturing joint venture with Stellantis
  - Jaguar Land Rover – British company making Jaguar and Land Rover vehicles
  - Tata Passenger Electric Mobility
  - Tata Technologies
- Tata Motors – commercial vehicles manufacturer
  - Tata Daewoo
  - Tata Marcopolo
  - Tata Hitachi Construction Machinery
- Tata AutoComp Systems – automotive components manufacturer
  - Automotive Stampings and Assemblies Ltd
  - TitanX – powertrain cooling supplier

=== Information technology ===
- Tata Consultancy Services (TCS) – Asia's largest IT company
  - Computational Research Laboratories – a high performance computing company
  - C-Edge Technologies – a joint venture between TCS and SBI
- Tata Elxsi – a product design and technology company

=== Airlines and hospitality ===
- Air India Limited
  - Air India – flag carrier of India
  - Air India Express – a scheduled passenger low cost airline
- TajAir – chartered flights
- Indian Hotels Company Limited – a hospitality company that manages hotels, resorts, jungle safaris, and in-flight catering services
  - Taj Hotels
  - Vivanta
  - Ginger Hotels
  - Benares Hotels
  - TajSATS Air Catering – a joint venture with SATS

=== Energy ===
- Tata Power – India's largest private sector electricity producer
  - Tata Power Solar
  - Maithon Power
  - Tata Power Delhi Dist Ltd
  - TP Central Odisha Dist Ltd
  - TP Western Odisha Dist Ltd
  - TP Northern Odisha Dist Ltd
  - TP South Odisha Dist Limited

=== Consumer and retail ===
- Tata Consumer Products – the world's second-largest tea business
  - Tetley
  - Good Earth Teas
  - Eight O'Clock Coffee
  - Tata Salt
  - Capital Foods – owner of Ching's Secret and Smith & Jones brands
  - Organic India
  - Tata Starbucks – a joint venture between Tata Consumer Products and Starbucks
- Titan Company – a luxury products company, formed in alliance with the Government of Tamil Nadu
  - Tanishq – a jewellery brand
  - Fastrack
  - Titan Eyeplus
  - Taneira
- Trent Limited
  - Westside
  - Zudio
  - Star Bazaar
  - Zara India – a joint venture between Trent and Inditex
- Tata Digital
  - Cromā – a retail chain of consumer electronics
  - Tata Cliq – e-commerce website, selling apparel, footwear and electronics
  - BigBasket – grocery and essentials delivery service
  - Tata 1mg – online healthcare platform
  - Tata Neu – a Tata Group super app
- Voltas – a home appliances company specialising in air conditioning and cooling technology
  - Voltas Beko – a joint venture with Beko

=== Communications and media ===
- Nelco, VSAT Communication division
- Tata Communications
  - Tata Communications Canada – formerly known as VSNL International Canada
  - Kaleyra
- Tata Teleservices – Telecommunications company
- Tata Play – a direct to home service
- Tejas Networks – networking products manufacturer

=== Financial services ===
- Tata Capital – financial services and wealth management company
- Tata Asset Management
  - Tata Mutual Fund
- Tata AIG – a general insurance-based joint venture company with AIG
- Tata AIA Life – a life insurance-based joint venture company with AIA
- Tata Investment Corp

=== Construction and real estate ===
- Tata Projects – an engineering, procurement and construction (EPC) company
  - Artson Engineering
- Tata Consulting Engineers Ltd
  - CDI Engineering Solutions
- Tata Realty & Infrastructure
  - Tata Housing Development Company – real estate development company

== Sports ==
- JRD Tata Sports Complex
- Tata Football Academy
- Tata Steel Chess Tournament
- Tata Steel United F.C.
- Telco Club Ground

== Educational and research institutes ==
- Indian Institute of Science
- National Centre for Performing Arts
- Nettur Technical Training Foundation R D Tata Technical Education Centre Jamshedpur
- Tata Ecotechnology Centre
- Tata Institute of Fundamental Research
- Tata Institute of Social Sciences
- Tata Management Training Centre
- Tata Memorial Hospital
- Tata Medical Centre, Kolkata
- The Energy and Resources Institute, formerly Tata Energy Research Institute
- Tata Institute for Genetics and Society
- Apprentice Training School, Tata Chemicals, Mithapur
- Kohli Center on Intelligent Systems, IIIT, Hyderabad
- Tata Indian Institute of Skills

== Former entities ==
- CMC
- Favre-Leuba
- NatSteel
- New India Assurance
- Tata Coffee
- Tata Interactive Systems
- Tata Docomo
- Tata McGraw Hill
- Tata Oil Mills Company
- Lakmé Cosmetics
- Tata Steel BSL
- Tata Textiles
- Tata Hispano
- Vistara
- Tata Business Support Services
- Tayo Rolls

== See also ==
- Tata Group subsidiaries
- Tata Motors topics
- Tata Sons subsidiaries
