= Sauvik Banerjjee =

Indian Businessman

- Born: Kolkata, West Bengal
- Education: University of Calcutta; University of Sunderland; University of Durham
- Occupation: Entrepreneur
- Title: Global CEO, Rezolve
- Spouse: Kasturi Banerjjee
- Parents: Ranabir Banerjjee (father); Sreoshi Banerjjee (mother)
- Website: sauvikbanerjjee.com

Sauvik Banerjjee is an Indian entrepreneur and former cricketer, currently serving as the Global CEO of products and technology at Rezolve Limited, a UK-based technology company. He was also a former chief technology officer at Tata Cliq and Tata Digital.

== Early life and background ==
Banerjjee was born and raised in Jodhpur Park, in a middle-class family. His father, Ranabir Banerjee, is a professor of applied physics, while his mother, Sreoshi, is an entrepreneur and cricketer. He attended St. Xavier's College, pursuing a degree in Economics and Statistics. However, he left college midway and relocated to the United Kingdom. Banerjjee completed both his undergraduate and master's degrees in Economics and Statistics through the distance education program at the University of Calcutta. Later, he pursued research in Natural Language Processing (NLP) and Physical Robotics at the University of Sunderland and the University of Durham.

== Career ==
Banerjjee's began his career working with companies, Accenture and Infosys. He also had a stint at Venda Inc, one of the ventures established by Dan Wagner, the Chairman and CEO of Rezolve. In 2014, Oracle Corporation acquired Venda Inc.

In 2016, he joined Tata Cliq, an e-commerce platform, as the Chief technology officer (CTO) after leaving consultancy firm SAP.

In 2019, Banerjjee was appointed as the CTO at Tata Digital, a subsidiary of the Tata Group. As the founding CTO, he spearheaded the launch of the Super app.

=== Cricketing career ===
Banerjjee was a professional cricketer who represented Bengal in the Ranji Trophy. During his time as a cricketer, he played for the Bengal team, representing his home state alongside other cricketers such as Sourav Ganguly, Arun Lal, Syed Saba Karim, and Deep Dasgupta in the Ranji Trophy. From 1993 to 1995, Banerjjee participated in the Wills Trophy and represented the Bengal Ranji team and various Kolkata clubs during the seasons of 1996 to 1998. He also played professional club cricket in England and Scotland from 1995 to 2003.
