= Odisha Solar Conference =

- Status: Active
- Genre: Solar Power Development
- Venue: The Crown; Mayfair Lagoon
- Locations: Bhubaneswar, Odisha
- Country: India
- Inaugurated: 2012
- Most recent: 2014
- Organizer: TiE Bhubaneswar; Canyon Consultancy Pvt. Ltd.
- Website: odishasolarconference.com

The Odisha Solar Conference (OSC) is a conference, the gathering of professionals to develop and promote solar power across Odisha. TiE (The Indus Entrepreneur), Bhubaneswar Chapter and Canyon Consultancy together organizes the Odisha Solar Conference every year to promote and create awareness amongst the local investors about the benefits from the solar industry. The conference is held every year in association with Odisha Electricity Regulatory Commission (OERC), Industrial Promotion & Investment Corporation of Odisha Limited (IPICOL), Grid Corporation of Odisha (GRIDCO) and supported by Ministry of New and Renewable Energy.

== History ==
The Odisha Solar Conference have completed its three editions in 2012, 2013, and 2014.

== Conference dates ==
| Conference | Location | Dates |
|---|---|---|
Conferences
| Odisha Solar Conference (OSC) 2012 | Mayfair Lagoon; Bhubaneswar, Odisha | October 6, 2012 |
| Odisha Solar Conference (OSC) 2013 | The Empress Hall; Bhubaneswar, Odisha | November 8, 2013 |
| Odisha Solar Conference (OSC) 2014 | The Crown; Bhubaneswar, Odisha | October 31, 2014 |

== Odisha Solar Conference 2012 ==
=== Organisers ===
The Organisers of the Odisha Solar Conference 2012 were Canyon Con, SEMI India & TiE Bhubaneswar.

==== Knowledge Partner ====
SEMI India was the Knowledge Partner for the Odisha Solar Conference 2012.

=== Sessions ===
- Session I: Government Facilitation, Regulatory & Finance
- Session II: Recruitment Process Outsourcing (RPO), REC, Solar Roof Top & Off Grid
- Session III: Warp Up & Interactive Session

== Odisha Solar Conference 2013 ==
=== Organisers ===
The Organisers of the Odisha Solar Conference 2013 were Canyon Consultancy, SEMI India & TiE Bhubaneswar.

==== Knowledge Partner ====
SEMI India was the Knowledge Partner for the Odisha Solar Conference 2013.

=== Sessions ===
- Session I: Solar Policy, RPO, REC & Hybrid Projects

National Solar Mission and State Solar Policies
Renewable Purchase Obligation (RPO) & Renewable Energy Certificate (REC) Mechanism
Biomass Solar Hybrid Projects

- Session II: Solar Thermal & Roof-top Solar PV

Solar Termal and Roof Top Solar PV
MW Scale Solar Roof-top Project in Twin City (Bhubaneswar-Cuttack)
Molten Salt based 24X7 Solar Thermal Project
Case Study of MW Scale Roof Top Solar in Gandhinagar
Case Study of 2.5kWp Roof Top Project in BJB Nagar, Bhubaneswar - Net Meter

- Session III: Solar Funding, Rural Electrification & CSR

Solar Funding from National Agencies and International Bi-Lateral Agencies
Remote Area Electrification through Solar
Green CSR (Corporate Social Responsibility) – Solar
Case Study of a Model Solar Village

== Odisha Solar Conference 2014 ==
=== Organisers ===
The Organisers of the Odisha Solar Conference 2014 were Canyon Consultancy, SEMI India & TiE Bhubaneswar.

==== Knowledge Partner ====
SEMI India was the Knowledge Partner for the Odisha Solar Conference 2014.

=== Sessions ===
- Session I: Solar Policy & Ultra Mega Solar Project
- Session II: Experience Of Agencies & Investors
- Session III: Potential of Solar Roof Top & Off Grid

== See also ==
- Punjab Solar Summit
