= TATA Housing Amantra =

General information
- Status: Phase 1 Complete
- Type: Premium Residential
- Location: Kalyan - Bhiwandi Junction
- Owner: Tata Housing Development Company

Design and construction
- Architect(s): HOK, United States

TATA Housing Amantra is a township in development built by Tata Housing Development Company. The township is a part of TATA Group and is located on Kalyan - Bhiwandi Junction on Mumbai - Nasik Expressway. It is estimated to become the tallest landmark residential development in Kalyan.

== Construction ==
TATA Housing Amantra is a premium residential township designed by renowned American architect firm, HOK. Amantra is spread over 22 acres and will offer 1642 apartments. In 2011, TATA Housing collaborated with Mumbai Metropolitan Region Development Authority (MMRDA) to launch a rental housing project, with Amantra being a part of this project.
