= Bhira =

Bhira may refer to:

- Bhira Hydroelectric Project, in Maharashtra, India
- Bhira Kheri, a town in Uttar Pradesh, India
- Sargis Bhira. a Christian monk who, according to Islamic tradition, foretold to Muhammad his future as a prophet

== See also ==
- Bira (disambiguation)
