= Odisha Electricity Regulatory Commission =

Electricity regulatory board of Odisha, India

- Company type: Government
- Industry: Electricity
- Founded: 1995
- Headquarters: Bidyut Niyamak Bhavan; Unit-VIII, Bhubaneswar, Odisha, India
- Area served: Odisha
- Key people: Shri Satya Prakash Nanda; CMD
- Owner: Government of Odisha
- Website: www.orierc.org

The Odisha State Electricity Regulatory Commission or OERC is a Public Sector Undertaking of Government of Odisha established under the Orissa Electricity Reform (OER) Act, 1995, as a part of the Reform Process in the State of Odisha.

== Divisions ==
The commission is organised to work through divisions namely Secretariat, Law, Engineering, Tariff and Administration.

== Subsidiaries ==
- Western Electricity Supply Company of Odisha Limited (WESCO)
- North Eastern Electricity Supply Company of Odisha Limited (NESCO)
- Central Electricity Supply Utility of Odisha (CESU)
- Southern Electricity Supply Company of Odisha Limited (SOUTHCO)

== Locations ==
- Balangir
- Balasore (Baleshwar)
- Berhampur (Brahmapur)
- Cuttack
- Dhenkanal
- Khordha
- Jeypore
- Rourkela
- Sambalpur
