= Tata Group =

Indian multinational conglomerate

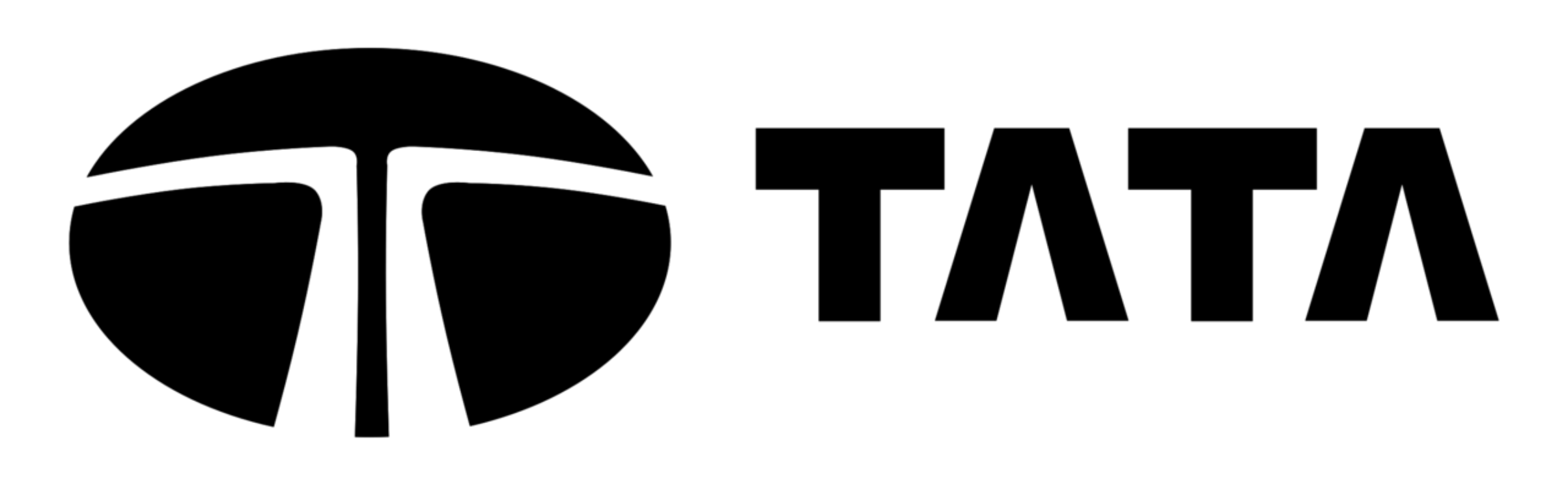

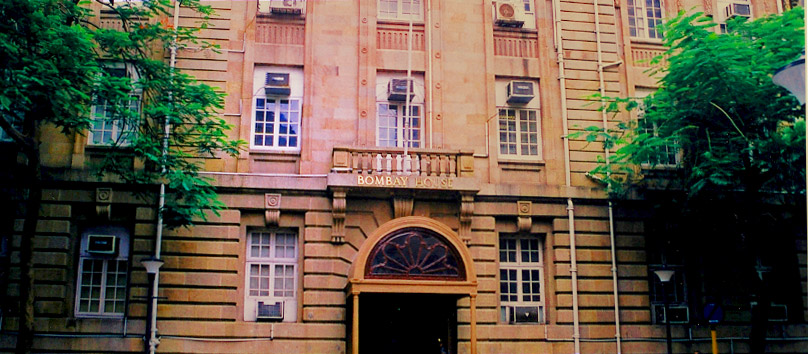
- Bombay House, the headquarters of Tata Group in Mumbai, India
- Type: Corporate group
- Industry: Conglomerate
- Founded: 1868; 158 years ago
- Founder: Jamsetji Nusserwanji Tata
- Headquarters: Mumbai, Maharashtra, India
- Area served: Worldwide
- Key people: Natarajan Chandrasekaran (Chairman)
- Products: Automobiles; Steel; Chemicals; Fast-moving consumer goods; Jewellery and watches; Home appliances; Aerospace and defence systems; Electronics and semiconductors; Telecommunications equipment
- Services: Information technology services and consulting; Airlines; Hospitality; Financial services and insurance; Electric power; Telecommunications; Direct-to-home (DTH); Retail and e-commerce; EPC and engineering consulting; Real estate
- Revenue: ▲₹16.24 trillion (US$170 billion) (2026)
- Operating income: ▲₹2.34 trillion (US$25 billion) (2026)
- Net income: ▲₹1.71 trillion (US$18 billion) (2026)
- Total assets: ▲₹30 lakh crore (US$320 billion) (2026)
- Owner: Tata Sons
- Number of employees: 1,160,125 (March 2026)
- Subsidiaries: 35 (See full list)
- Website: www.tata.com
- Footnotes; Financials as of 31 March 2026.

The Tata Group (/ˈtɑːtɑː/) is an Indian multinational conglomerate headquartered in Mumbai. Established in 1868, it is India's largest conglomerate.

Tata Group comprises numerous affiliate companies, with Tata Sons as the holding company and promoter. As of October 2025, there are more than 20 publicly listed Tata Group affiliate companies, with a combined market capitalisation of ₹31.17 trillion (US$330 billion).

== History ==
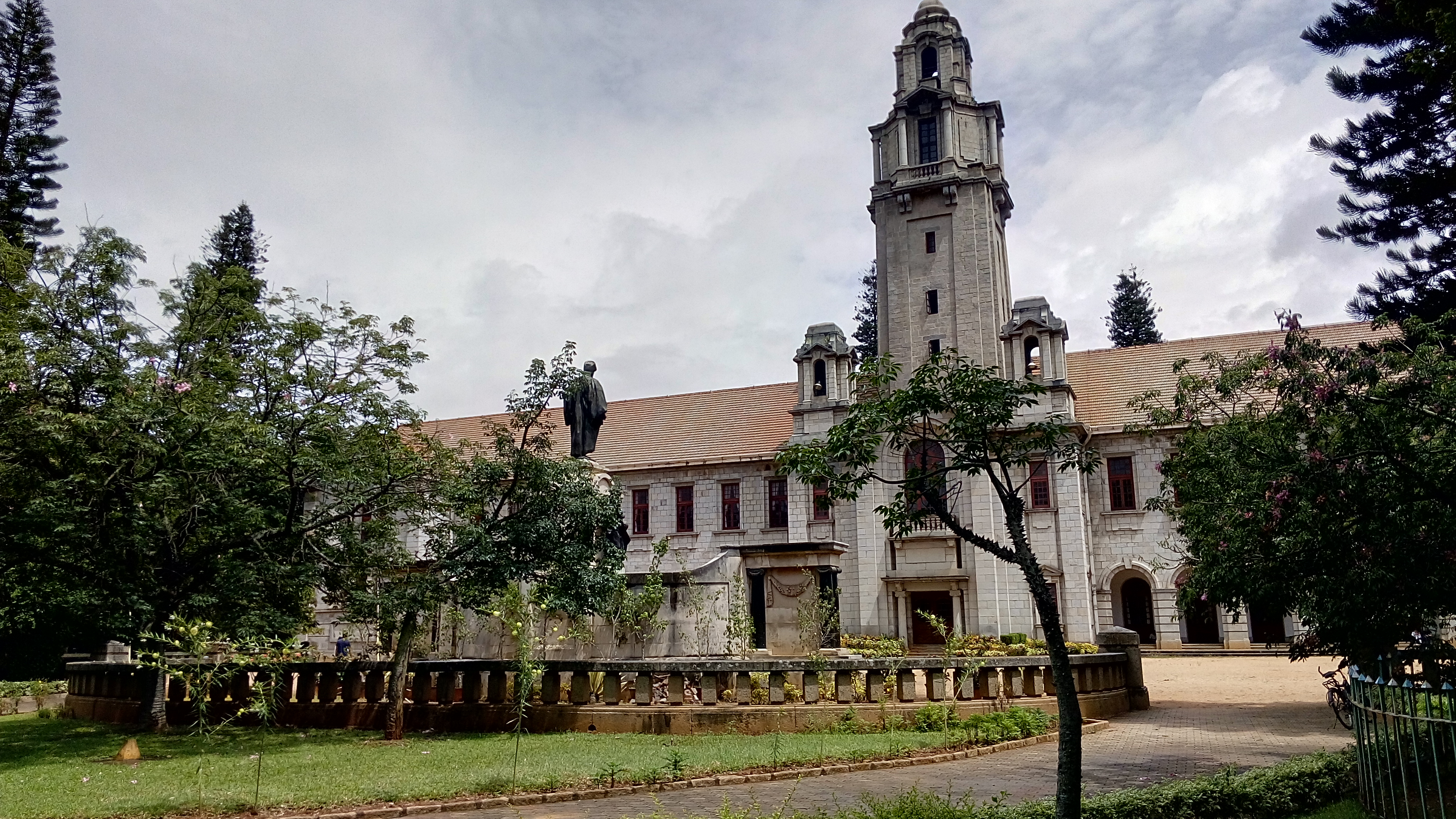
The Indian Institute of Science in Bangalore; foundation was laid by Jamsetji Tata along with Krishna Raja Wadiyar IV.

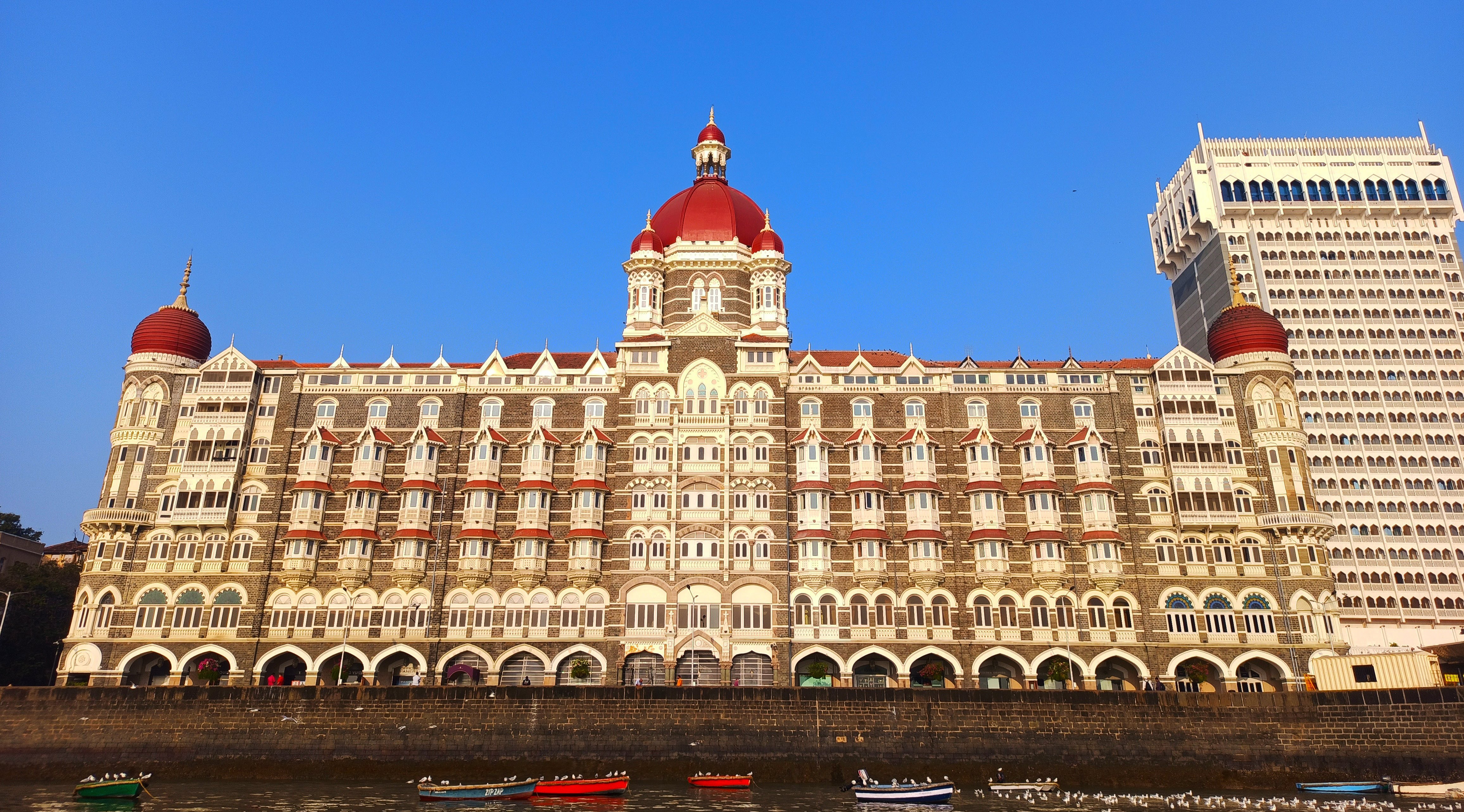
The Taj Mahal Palace Hotel in Mumbai is owned by Tata Group.

During the cotton boom in Bombay triggered by the American Civil War, Jamsetji Nusserwanji Tata and his father became involved with the Asiatic Banking Corporation. However, when the market declined, the firm faced significant financial difficulties. In 1868, the family’s fortunes improved substantially after securing a share in a profitable contract to supply the commissariat for Napier's expedition to Abyssinia. Throughout his career, Tata remained focused on four major aspirations: establishing an iron and steel company, building a landmark hotel, founding a world-class educational institution, and developing hydroelectric power.

=== 1868–1939 ===
In 1870, with ₹21,000 of capital, he founded a trading company. Further, he bought a bankrupt oil mill at Chinchpokli and converted it into a cotton mill, under the name Empress Mill, which he sold for a profit after two years. In 1874, he set up another cotton mill at Nagpur named Empress Mill. During his lifetime, in 1903, the company opened the Taj Mahal Hotel at Colaba waterfront as the first hotel with electricity in British India.

After Jamsetji's 1904 death, his older son Dorabji Tata became chairman. Sir Dorabji established the Tata Iron and Steel Company (TISCO), now known as Tata Steel in 1907. Marking the group's global ambitions, Tata Limited opened its first overseas office in London. Following the founder's goals, Western India's first hydro plant was brought to life, giving birth to Tata Power. Fulfilling yet another dream, the Indian Institute of Science was established, admitting its first group of students in 1911.

=== 1938–1990 ===
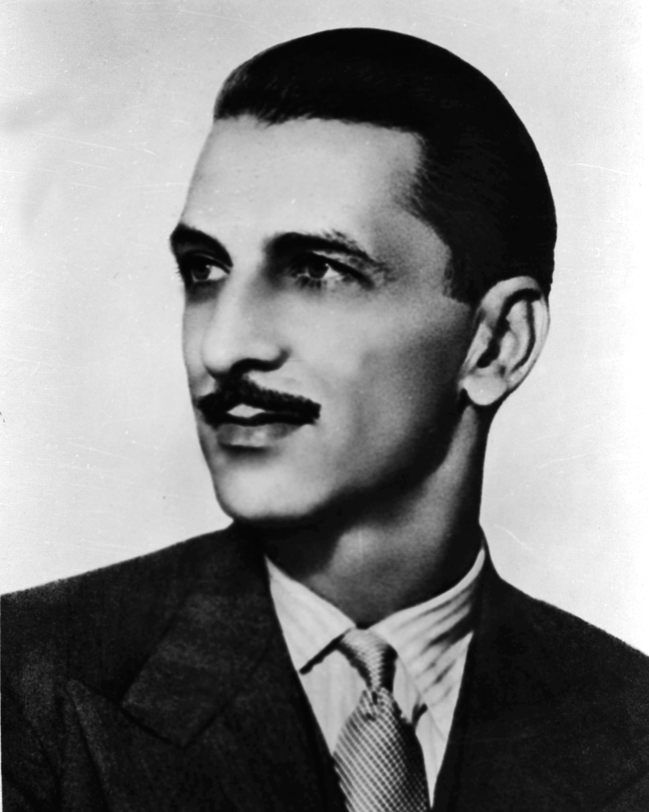
JRD Tata was chairman of Tata Group 1938–1991.

JRD Tata was made chairman of the Tata Group in 1938. Under his chairmanship, the assets of the Tata Group grew from US$101 million to over US$5 billion. Starting with 14 enterprises, upon his departure half a century later in 1988, Tata Sons had grown to a conglomerate of 95 enterprises. These enterprises consisted of ventures that the company had either started or in which they held a controlling interest. New sectors such as chemicals, technology, cosmetics, marketing, engineering, manufacturing, tea, and software services earned them recognition.

In 1932, Tata founded its airline, known as Tata Air Services (later renamed Tata Airlines and then Air India). In 1953, the Government of India passed the Air Corporations Act and purchased a majority stake in the carrier from Tata Sons, though JRD Tata would continue as chairman until 1977.

In 1945, Tata Motors was founded, first focused on locomotives. In 1954, it entered the commercial vehicle market after forming a joint venture with Daimler-Benz. In 1968, Tata Consultancy Services (TCS) was founded.

=== 1991–2017 ===
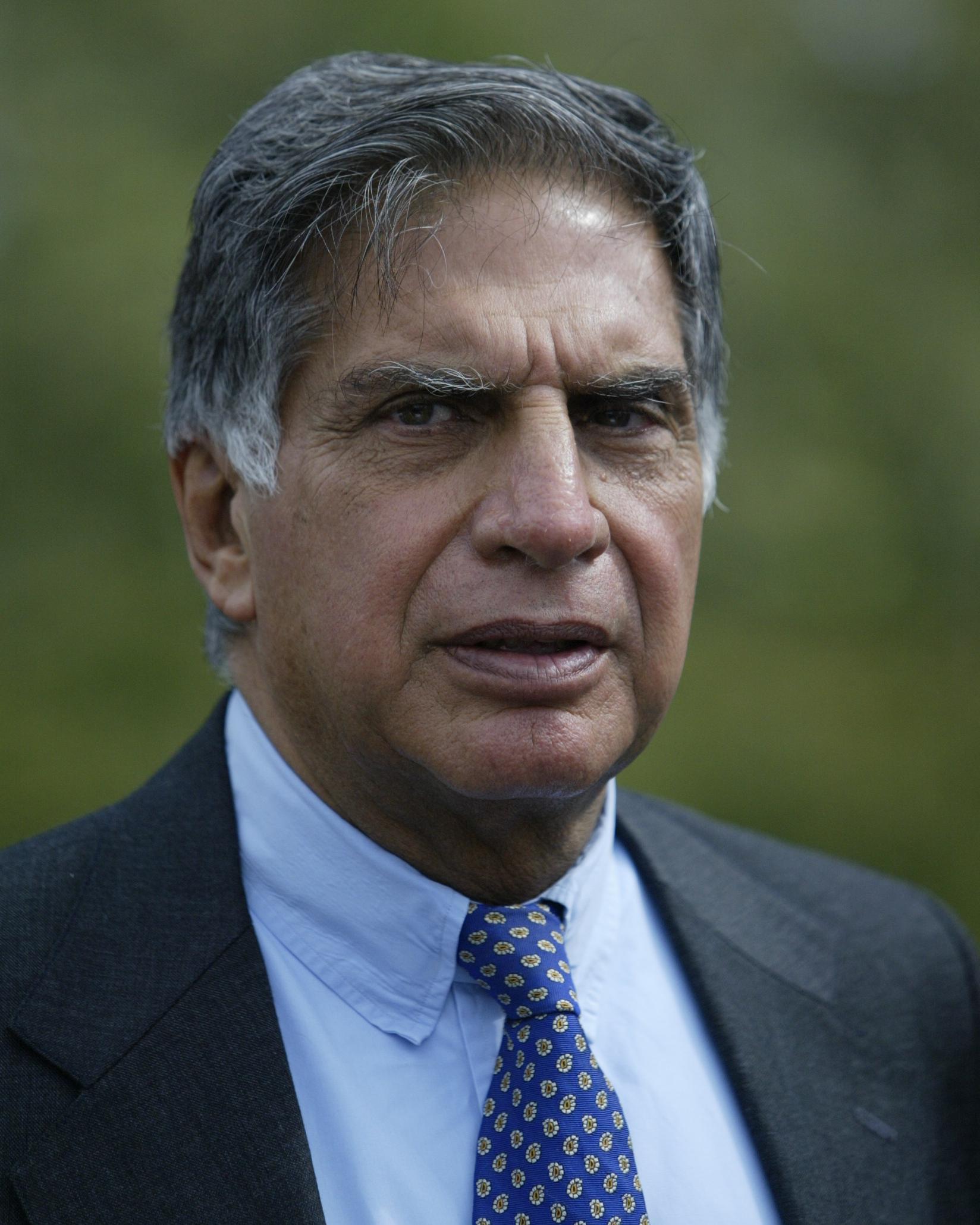
Ratan Tata, the former chairman of the company, led the acquisition of several companies by Tata Group.

In 1991, Ratan Tata became chairman of Tata Group. This was also the year of economic liberalization in India, opening up the market to foreign competitors. During this time, Tata Group began to acquire several companies. Tata Group bought Tetley In February 2000. After that, it acquired Corus Group in 2007. The next year, the company's subsidiary Tata Motors launched the Tata Nano, presenting it as "the world’s most affordable car," and acquired Jaguar and Land Rover from Ford Motor Company.

In 2017, Natarajan Chandrasekaran was appointed chairman. He was instrumental in restructuring business verticals and increasing promoter stake ownership in companies. Under his leadership, the group made acquisitions through insolvency law and investments in e-commerce, expanded its airline business by winning a bid for Air India, and completely bought Air Asia India. He has mentioned the future strategy is to focus on healthcare, electronics, and digital. Tata-owned Air India got approval to acquire AirAsia India nearly two months after putting forth the proposal. The Competition Commission of India (CCI) approved the acquisition of the entire shareholding in Air Asia India by Tata-owned Air India.

== Leadership ==
The chairman of Tata Sons is usually the chairman of the Tata Group. As of 2020, there have been seven chairmen of the Tata Group.

- Jamsetji Tata (1868–1904)
- Dorabji Tata (1904–1932)
- Nowroji Saklatvala (1932–1938)
- JRD Tata (1938–1991)
- Ratan Tata (1991–2012, 2016–2017)
- Cyrus Mistry (2012–2016)
- Natarajan Chandrasekaran (2017–present)

== Affiliated companies ==
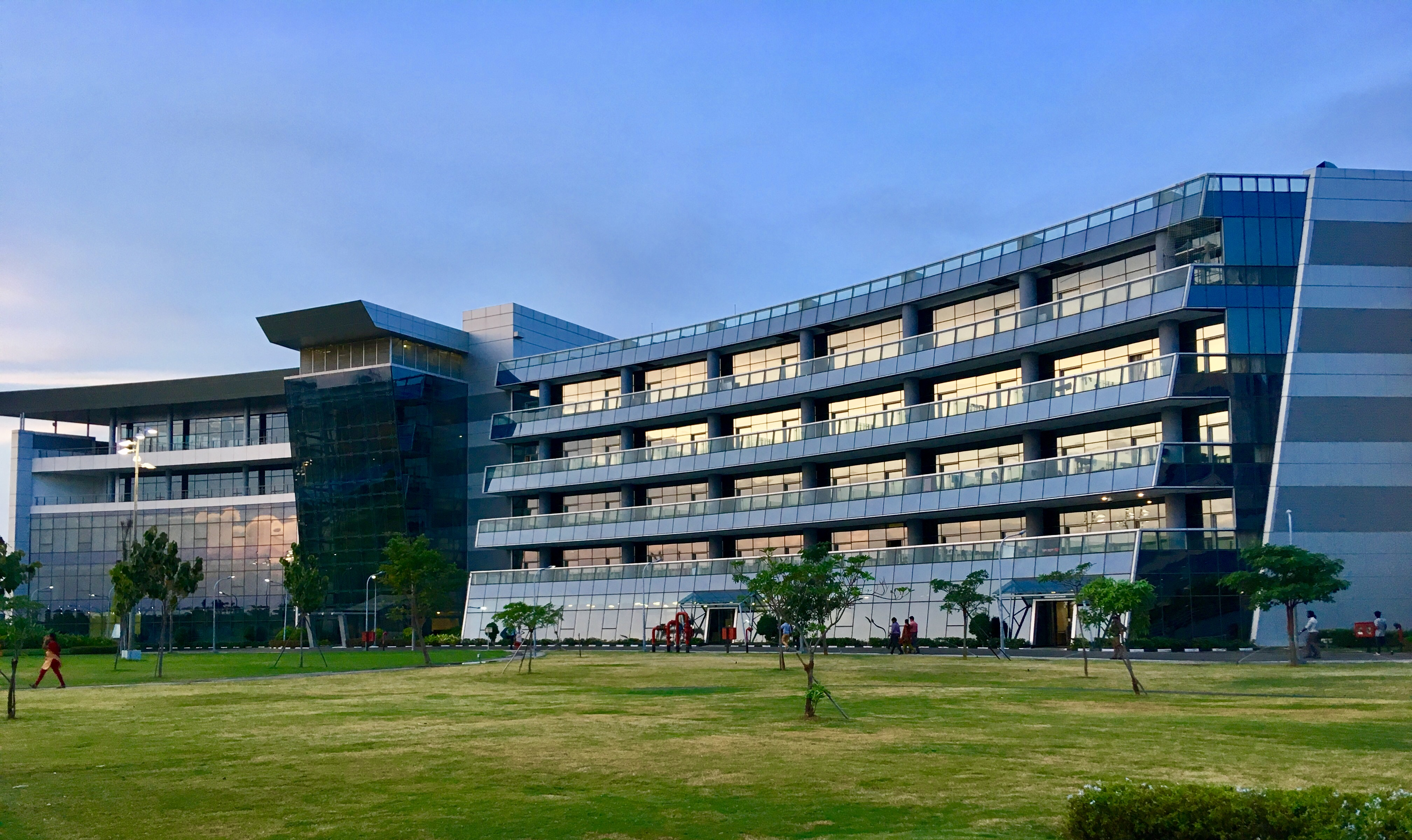
Tata Consultancy Services

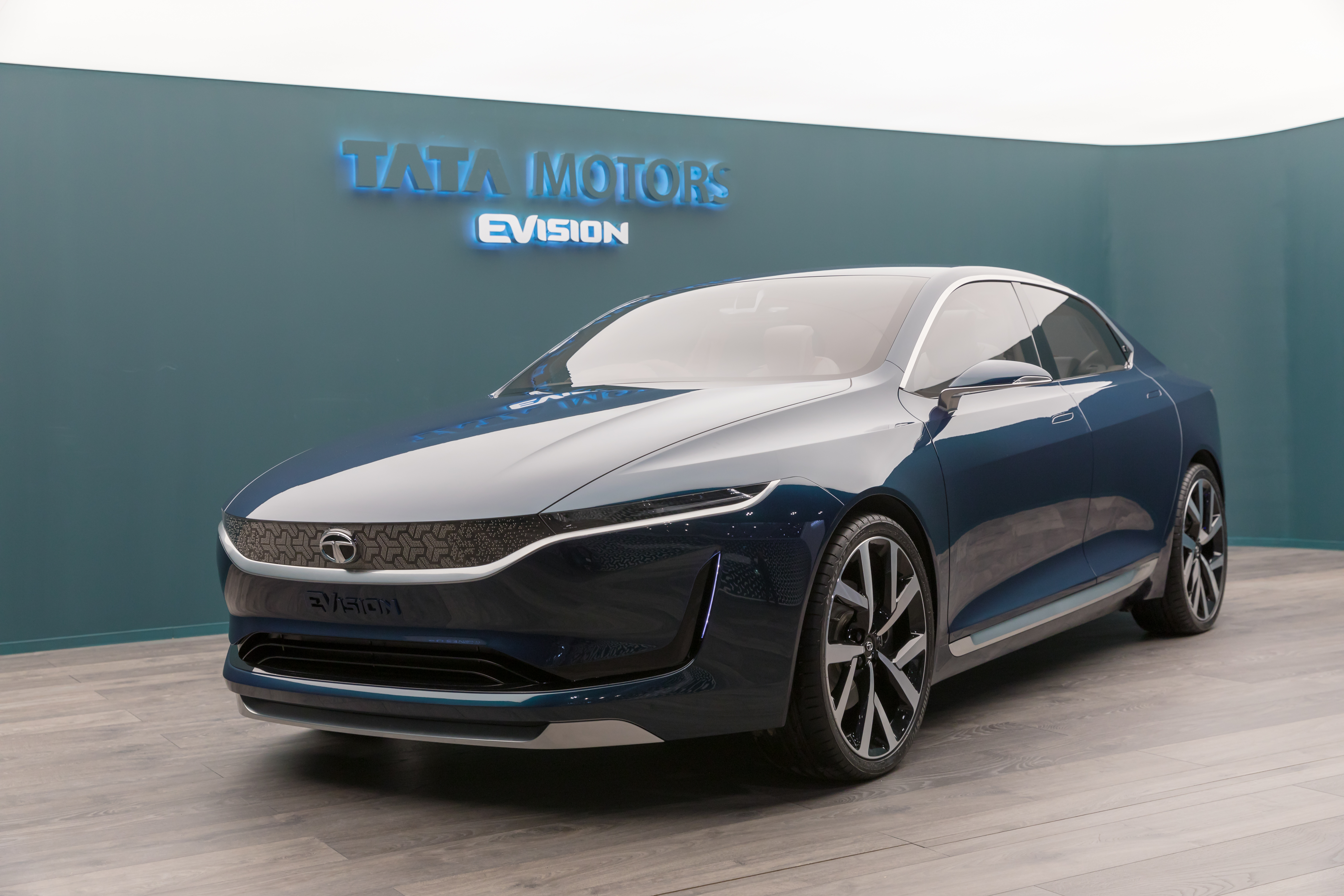
Tata Motors Passenger Vehicles

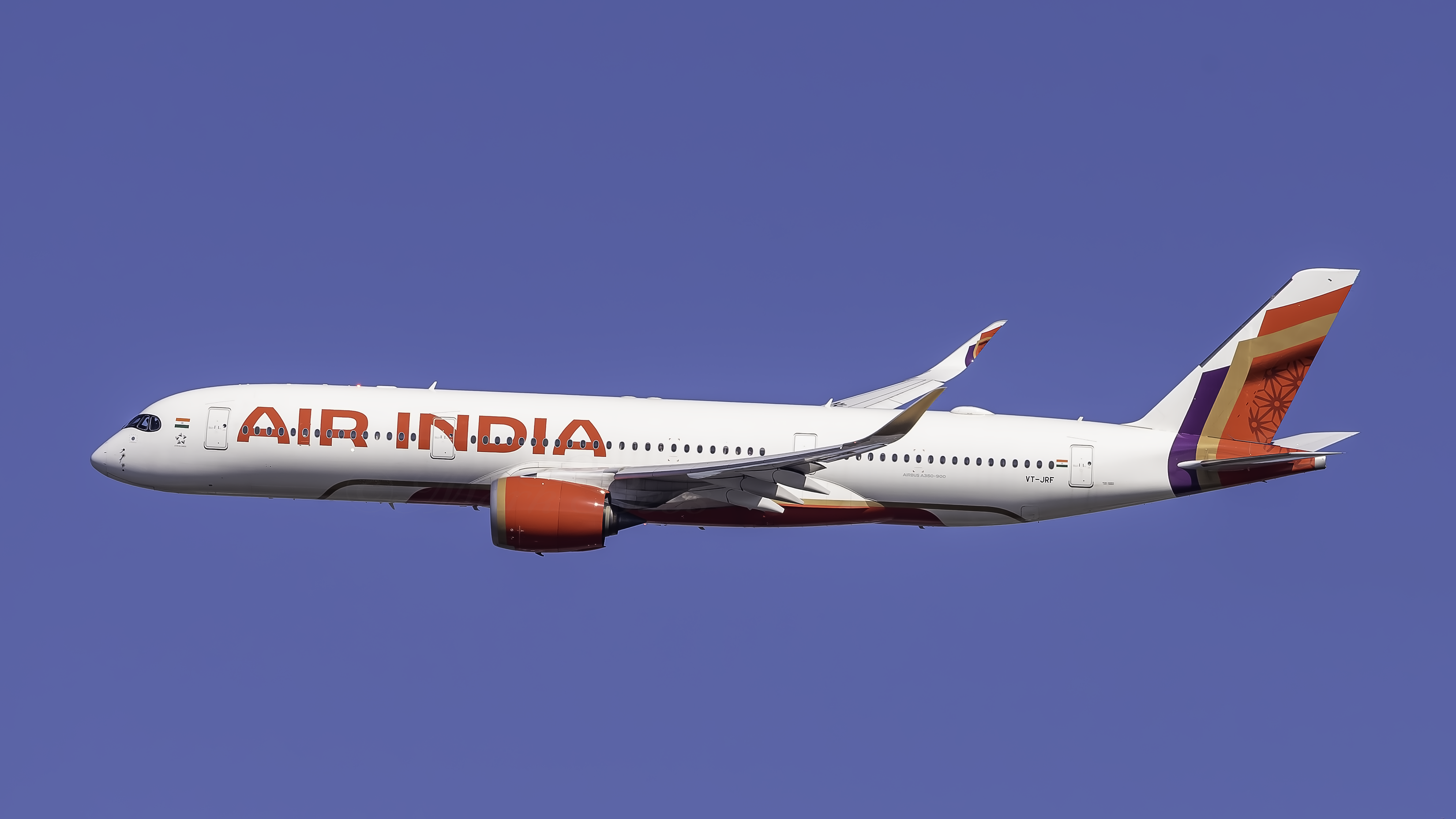
Air India Limited

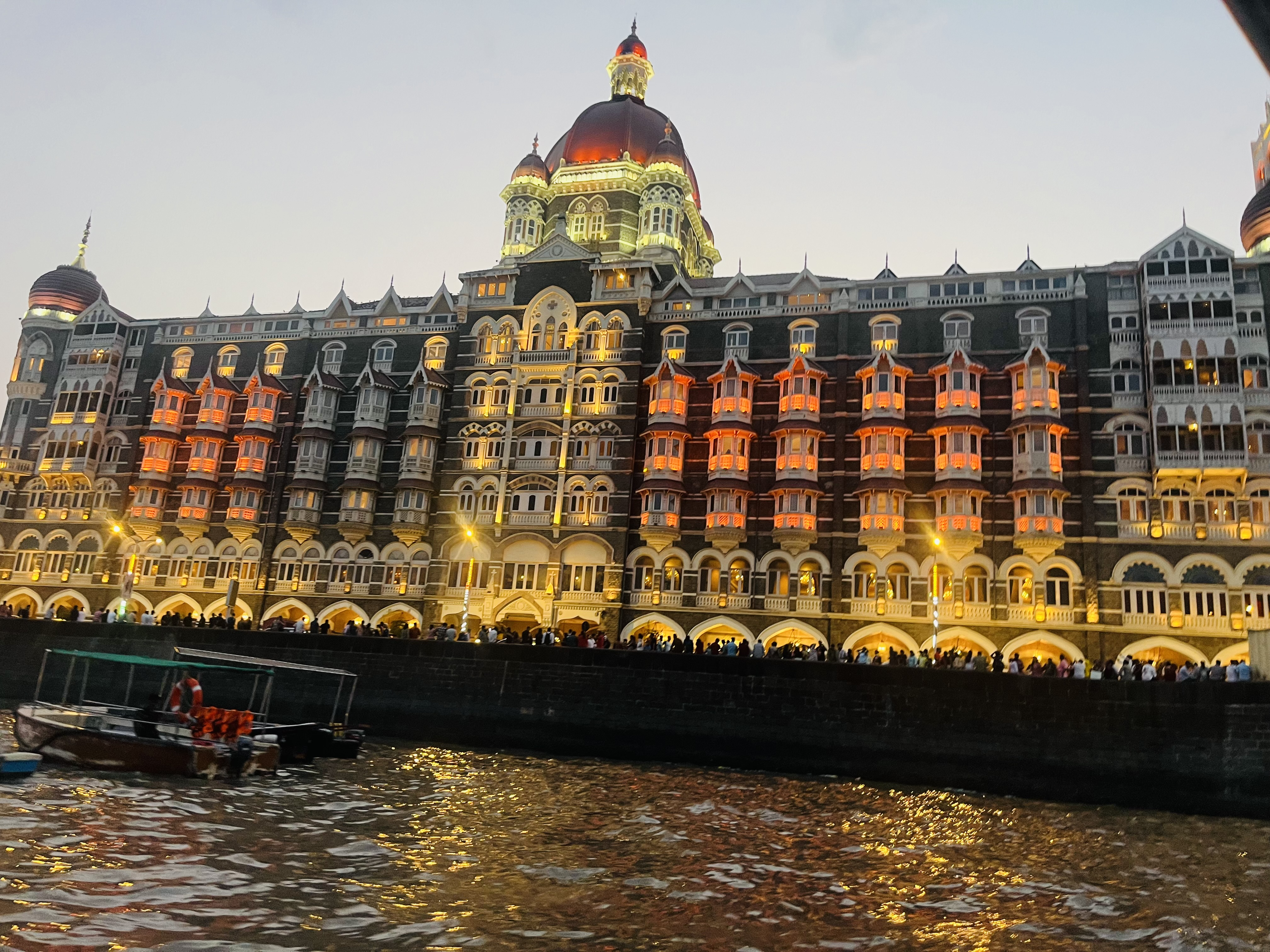
Taj Hotels by IHCL

Tata Communications

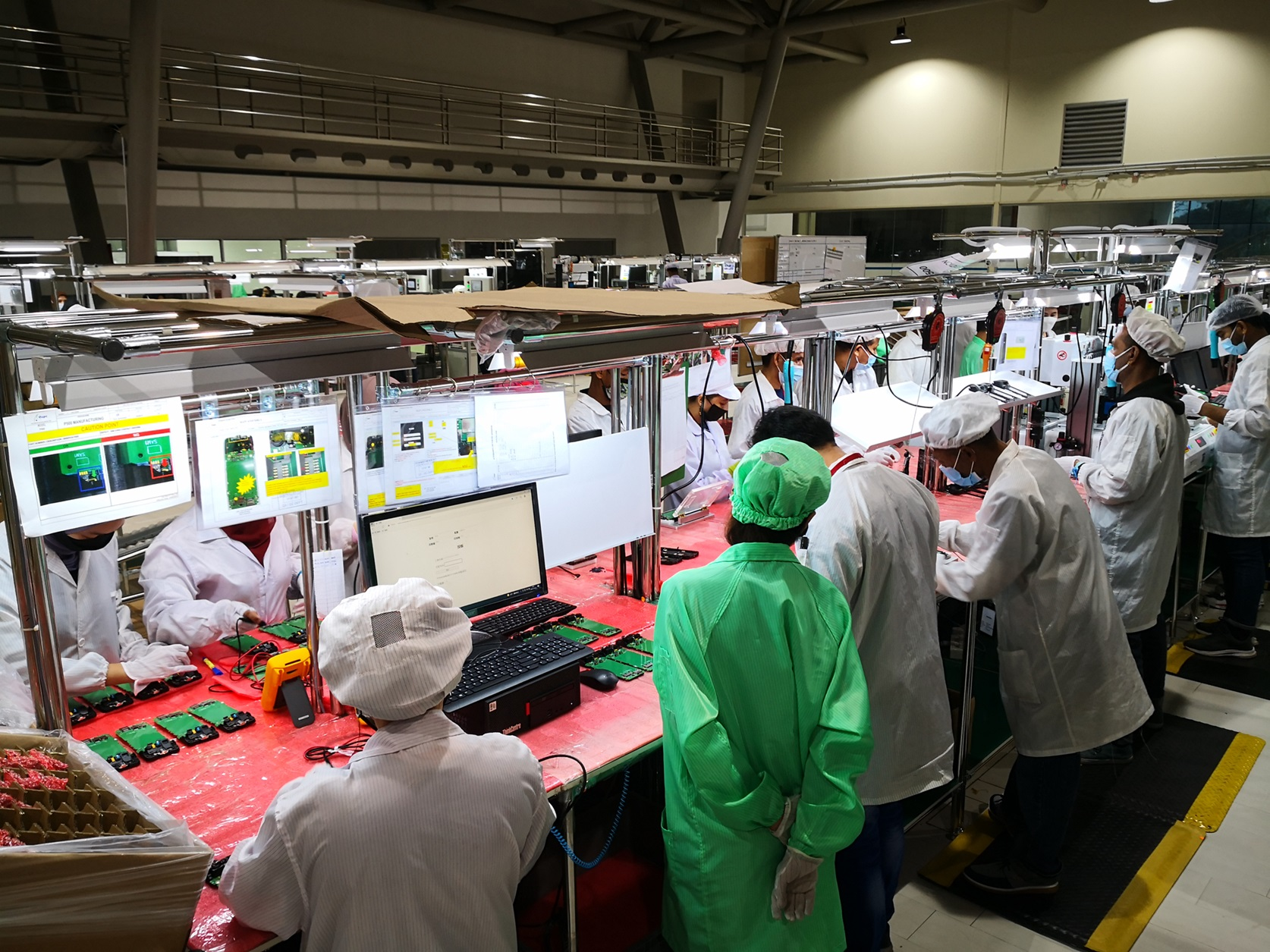
Tata Electronics

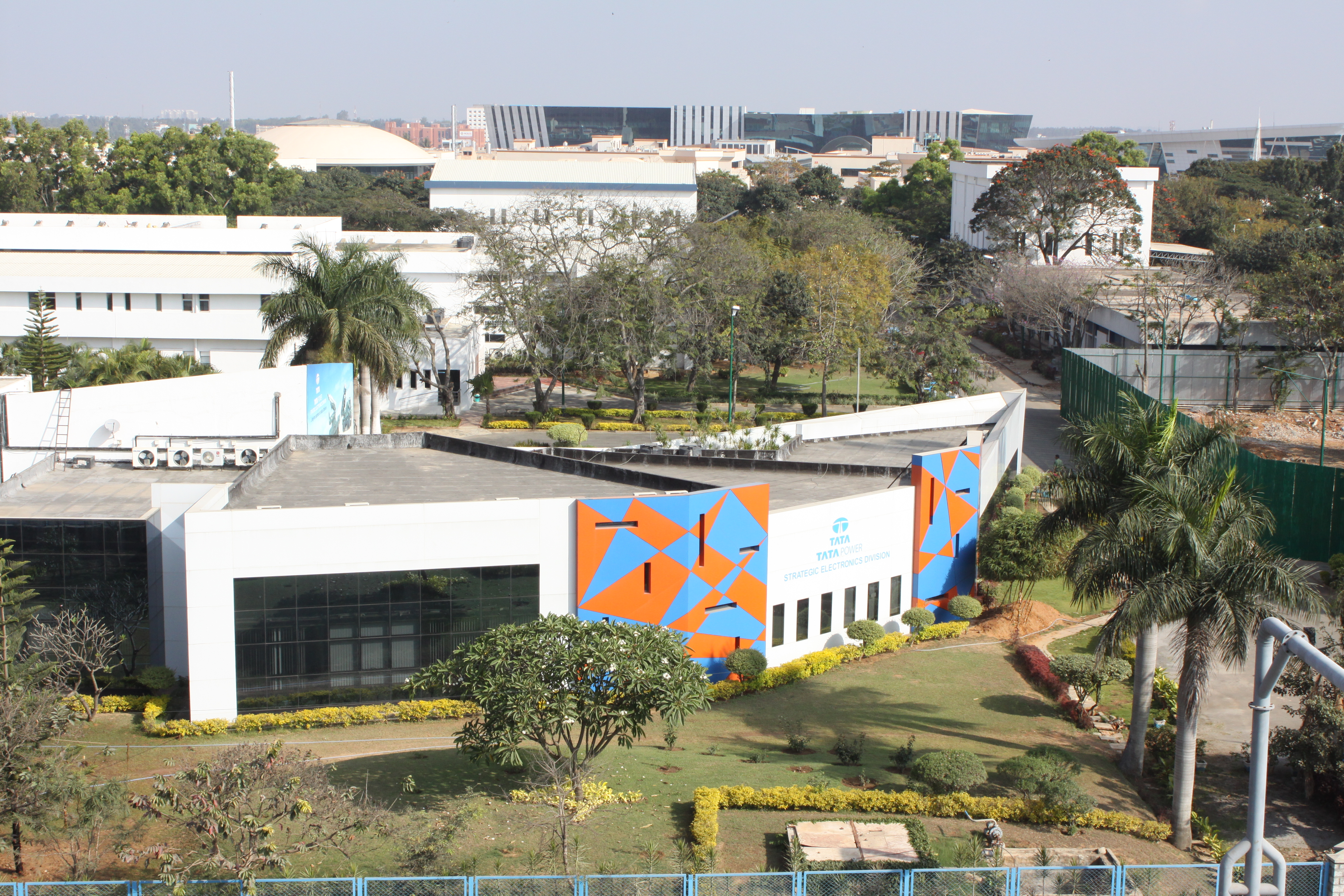
Tata Power

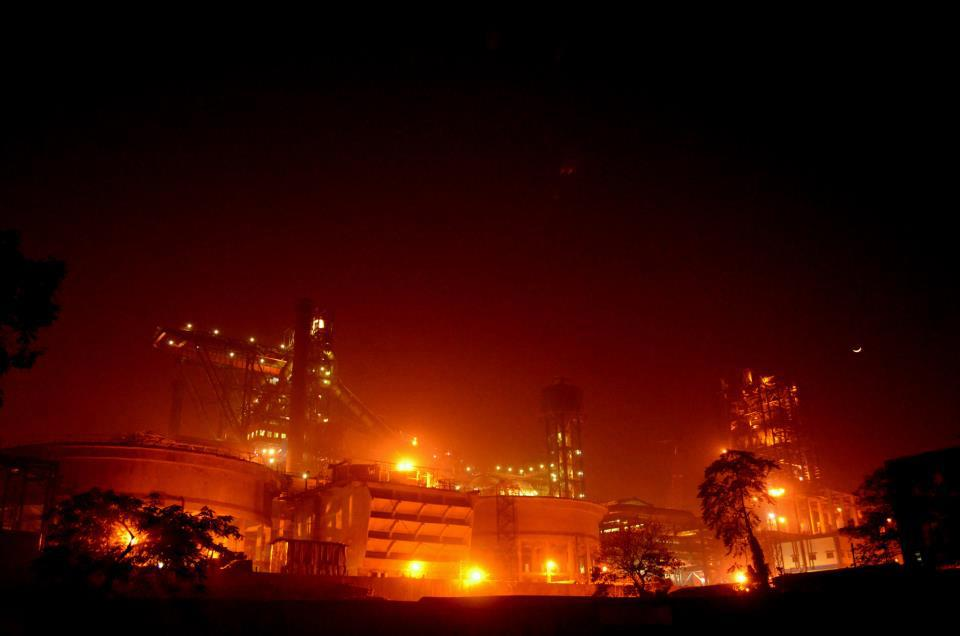
Tata Steel

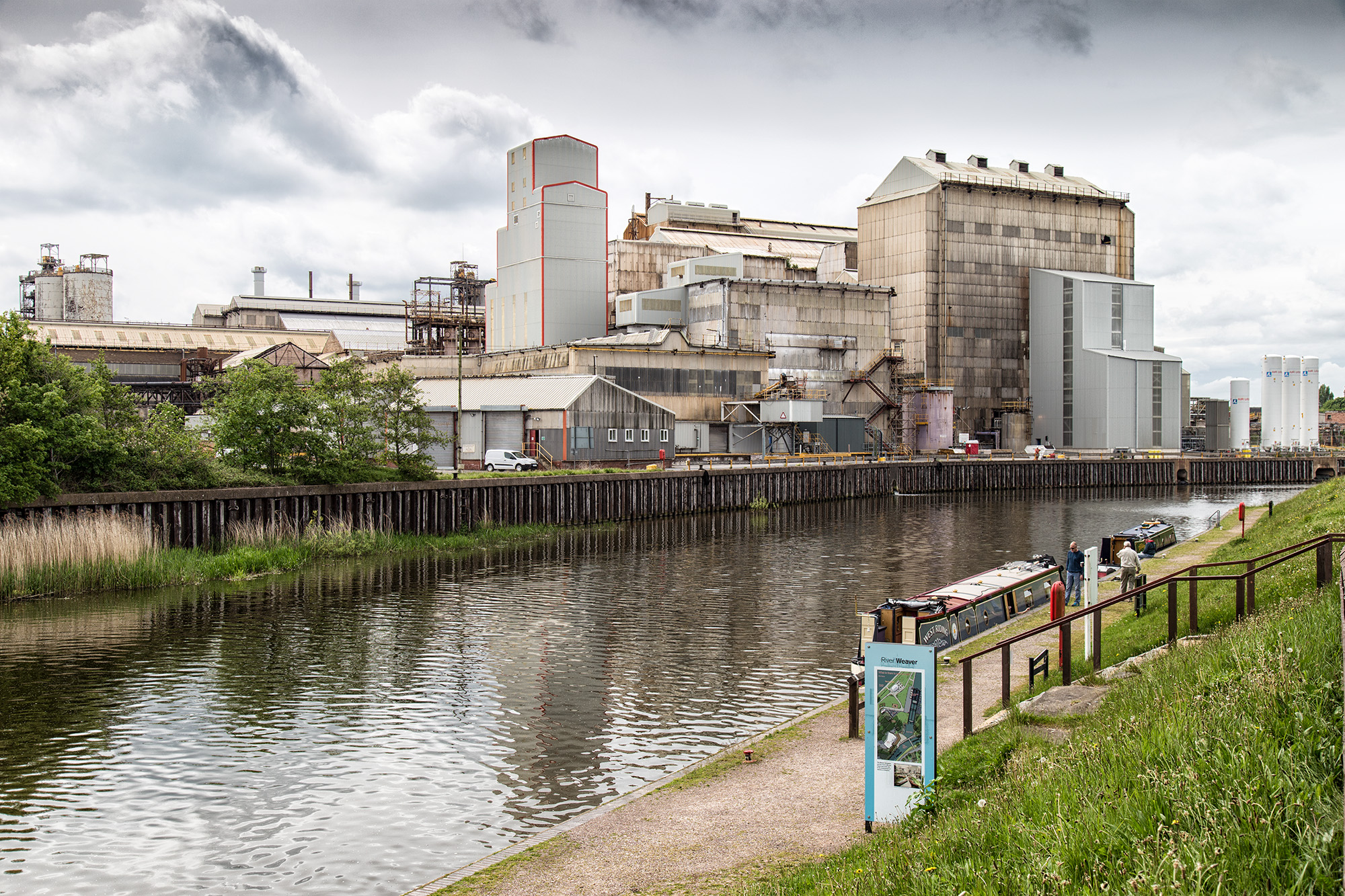
Tata Chemicals

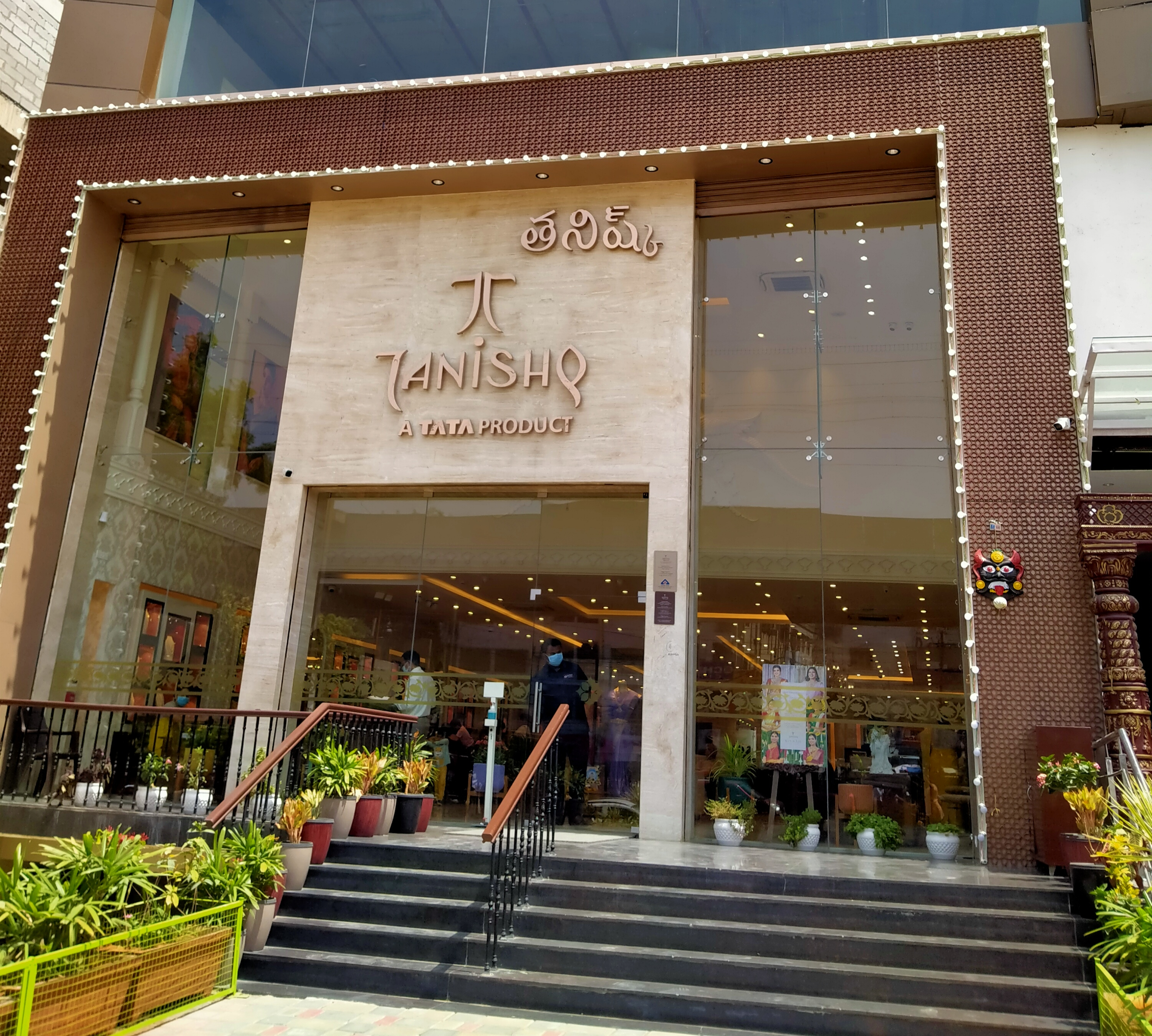
Tanishq by Titan

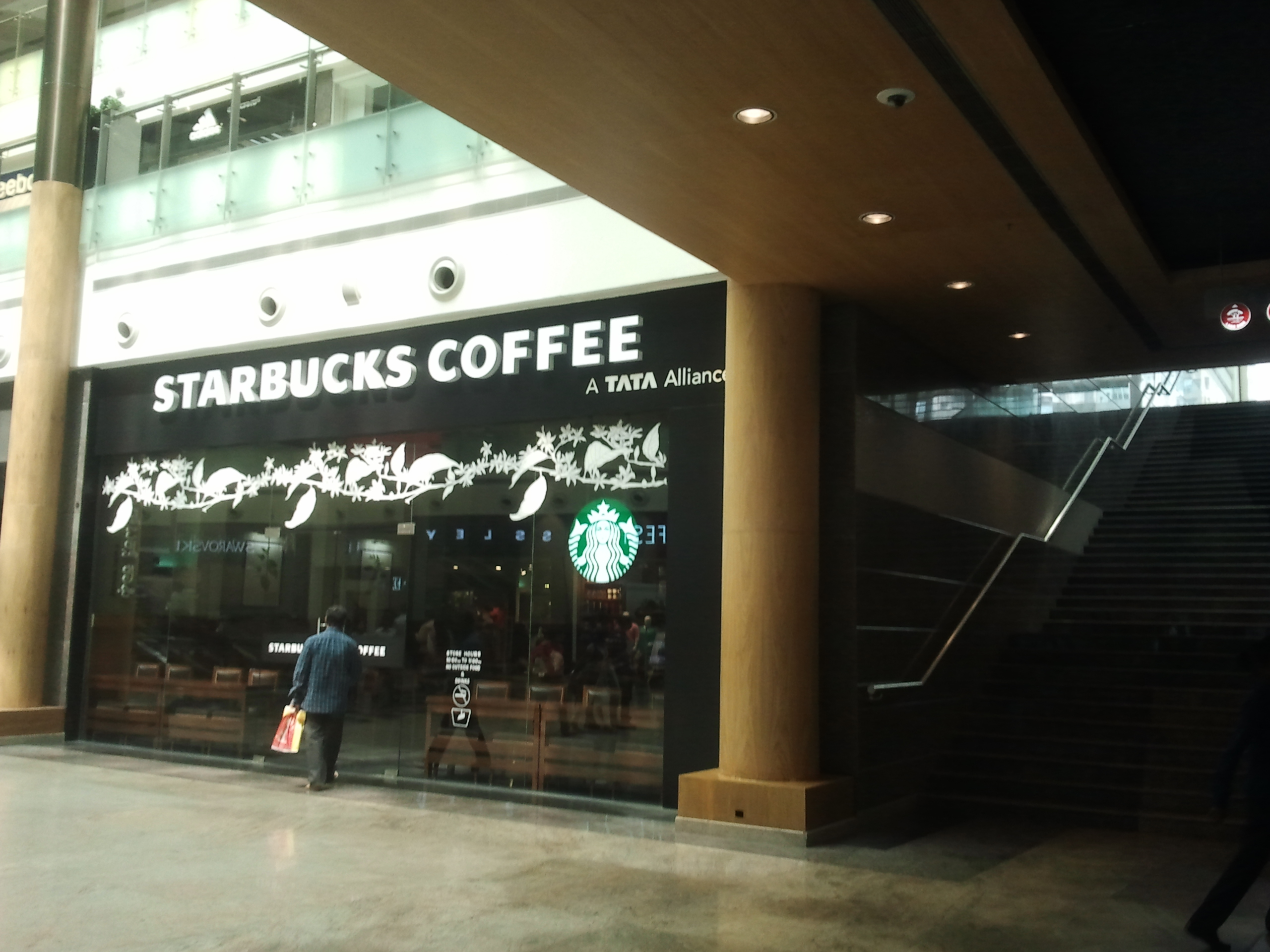
Tata Starbucks

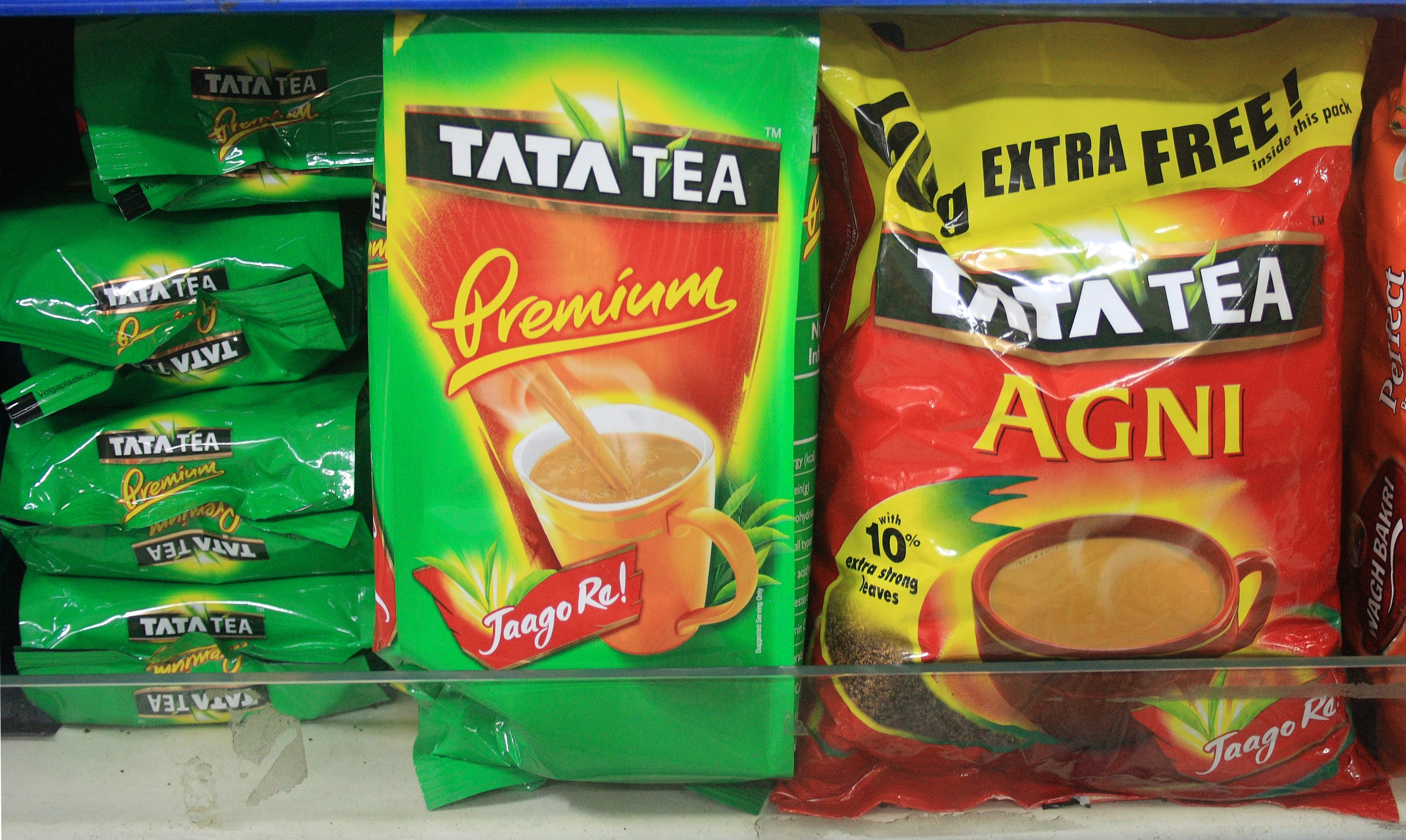
Tata Consumer Products

Company	Major subsidiaries	Equity stake
Aerospace and defence
Tata Advanced Systems	1. Tasec; 2. Tata–Sikorsky Aerospace Limited (74%); 3. Tata–Lockheed Martin Aerostructures Limited (74%); 4. Tata–Boeing Aerospace Limited (51%)	100%
Information technology
Tata Consultancy Services (TCS)	TRDDC	72.27%
Tata Elxsi		42.22%
Steel
Tata Steel	1. Tata Steel Netherlands; 2. Tata Steel UK; 3. Tata Steel Thailand; 4. Tata Robins Fraser Ltd.(TRF); 5. Mjunction	32.46%
Electrical and electronics
Tata Electronics		100%
Voltas	Universal MEP Projects & Engineering Services	26.64%
Energy
Tata Power	1. Tata Power Solar; 2. Nelco Limited (50.04%); 3. Maithon Power; 4. Tata Power Delhi Distribution; 5. TP Central Odisha Distribution; 6. TP Western Odisha Distribution; 7. TP Northern Odisha Distribution	45.21%
Engineering and construction
Tata Projects		100%
Tata Consulting Engineers		100%
Real estate
Tata Housing		100%
Tata Realty and Infrastructure		100%
Automotive
Tata Motors Passenger Vehicles	1. Tata Technologies; 2. Fiat India Automobiles (50%); 3. Jaguar Land Rover	46.40%
Tata Motors	1. Tata Daewoo; 2. Tata Hispano; 3. Tata Hitachi Construction Machinery (40%)	
Tata AutoComp Systems		100%
Tata International Vehicle Applications		100%
Chemicals
Tata Chemicals	1. Tata Chemicals Europe; 2. Rallis India; 3. British Salt; 4. Magadi Soda Company; 5. Tata Swach	31.90%
Retail and e-commerce
Trent		32.45%
Tata Digital	1. BigBasket (68%); 2. Tata 1mg (55%); 3. Tata Neu; 4. Tata Cliq; 5. Cromā; 6. Tata nexarc	100%
Titan Company		25.02%
Consumer goods
Tata Consumer Products	1. Tata myBistro; 2. Tata Starbucks (50%)	29.39%
Financial services
Tata Capital		85.41%
Tata Asset Management	Tata Mutual Fund	100%
Tata AIG		51%
Tata AIA Life		51%
Tata Investment Corp		68.51%
Tourism and travel
Indian Hotel Company	1. Taj Hotels; 2. Vivanta; 3. Ginger	38.43%
TajAir		100%
Air India Limited	1. Air India; 2. Air India Express; 3. Air India SATS Airport Services (50%)	74.9%
Telecom and media
Tata Communications	Tata Communications Canada	31.90%
Tata Teleservices		19.58%
Tata Play		100%
Tejas Networks		52.40%
Trading and distribution
Tata International Group	1. Feetscience; 2. Tagra	100%
Medical devices
Tata Medical and Diagnostics		100%

== Acquisitions ==
- February 2000 – Tetley, $407 million
- March 2004 – Daewoo, $102 million
- August 2004 – NatSteel's Steel business, $292 million
- November 2004 – Tyco Global Network, $130 million
- July 2005 – Teleglobe International Holdings, $239 million
- October 2005 – Good Earth Corporation
- December 2005 – Millennium Steel, Thailand, $165 million
- December 2005 – Brunner Mond Chemicals, $10 million
- June 2006 – Eight O'Clock Coffee, $220 million
- November 2006 – Ritz Carlton Boston, $170 million
- January 2007 – Corus Group, $12 billion
- March 2007 – PT Kaltim Prima Coal (KPC) (Bumi Resources), $1.1 billion
- April 2007 – Campton Place Hotel, San Francisco, $60 million
- January 2008 – Imacid Chemical Company, Morocco
- February 2008 – General Chemical Industrial Products, $1 billion
- March 2008 – Jaguar Cars and Land Rover, $2.3 billion
- March 2008 – Serviplem SA, Spain
- April 2008 – Comoplesa Lebrero SA, Spain
- June 2008 – China Enterprise Communications, China
- October 2008 – Miljo Grenland / Innovasjon, Norway
- April 2010 – Hewitt Robins International, United Kingdom
- July 2013 – Alti SA, France
- December 2014 – Energy Products Limited, India
- June 2016 – Welspun Renewables Energy, India
- May 2018 – Bhushan Steel Limited, India
- February 2021 – BigBasket (68%) by Tata Digital
- June 2021 – 1mg (55%) by Tata Digital
- October 2021 – Air India, Air India Express and 50% stake in Air India SATS, ₹180 billion (US$1.9 billion)
- January 2022 – Nilachala Ispat Nigam Ltd, $1.5 billion
- June 2023 – Kaleyra, Inc by Tata Communications, $100 million
- January 2024 – Capital Foods (75%) by Tata Consumer Products, ₹51 billion (US$540 million)
- July 2025 – Iveco by Tata Motors, €3.8 billion
- August 2026 - MHP Management- und IT-Beratung by Tata Consultancy Services, €320 million

=== Former companies ===
- Tata Interactive Systems
- Tata Oil Mills Company and its subsidiary Lakmé Cosmetics
- Tata Petrodyne

== Philanthropy ==
Tata Group has helped establish and finance numerous research, educational and cultural institutes in India, and received the Carnegie Medal of Philanthropy.

In 2008, Tata Group donated US$50 million to Cornell University for "agricultural and nutrition programs in India and for the education of Indian students at Cornell."

In 2010, Tata Group donated ₹2.20 billion (US$50 million) to Harvard Business School to build an academic and a residential building for executive education programmers on the institute's campus in Boston, Massachusetts. The building, now known as Tata Hall, is the largest endowment received by Harvard Business School from an international donor.

In 2017, Tata Trusts gifted US$70 million to University of California, San Diego and also partnered with it in setting up Tata Institute for Genetics and Society (TIGS) to address issues in public health and agriculture. In recognition of the donation, the building which houses TIGS has been named Tata Hall. It is also the largest international donation made to University of California, San Diego.

In 2017, TCS donated a US$35 million grant to Carnegie Mellon University, the largest ever industry donation to the university, to collaborate on promoting next-generation technologies that will drive the Fourth Industrial Revolution, including cognitive systems and autonomous vehicles.

In 2017, the Tata Football Academy won the bid to form the Jamshedpur FC, an ISL football club based in Jamshedpur, Jharkhand.

In 2020, Tata Group donated ₹15 billion to PM Cares Fund to fight against COVID-19 pandemic in India.

In 2024, the Tata Trusts' Small Animal Hospital in Mumbai was started by Ratan Tata to provide medical care for pets, including dogs, cats, and rabbits.

=== Tata Trusts ===
Most of the philanthropic activities of the group are carried out by various trusts incorporated by the members of the Tata family.

1. Sir Dorabji Tata Trust and Allied Trusts
  - Sir Dorabji Tata Trust
  - Lady Tata Memorial Trust
  - JRD Tata Trust
  - Jamsetji Tata Trust
  - Tata Social Welfare Trust
  - JN Tata Endowment
  - Tata Education Trust
  - RD Tata Trust
  - The JRD and Thelma J Tata Trust
2. Sir Ratan Tata Trust and Allied Trusts
  - Sir Ratan Tata Trust
  - Tata Education and Development Trust
  - Navajbai Ratan Tata Trust
  - Bai Hirabai J. N. Tata Navsari Charitable Institution
  - Sarvajanik Seva Trust

== Controversies ==
The company has attracted controversy for reports of political corruption, cronyism, theft, mass killings, (Note: Frequently, mass killings are aimed at displacing indigenous land claims.) involvement in the Gaza war, as well as exploitation of its customers, Indian citizens, and natural resources.

=== Munnar, Kerala ===
The Kerala Government filed an affidavit in the high court alleging that Tata Tea had "grabbed" 3,000 acres (12 km^{2}) of forest land at Munnar. The Tatas provided that they possessed 58,741.82 acres (237.7197 km^{2}) of land, which they are allowed to retain under the Kannan Devan Hill (Resumption of Lands) Act, 1971, and there was a shortage of 278.23 hectares (2.7823 km^{2}) in that. The Chief Minister of Kerala V.S. Achuthanandan, who vowed to evict all on government land in Munnar, formed a special squad for the Munnar land takeover mission and started acquiring back properties. However, the mission was aborted due to both influential landholders and opposition from Achuthanandan's own party.

=== Kalinganagar, Odisha ===
On 2 January 2006, Kalinganagar, Tribal Orissa villagers protested against the construction of a new steel plant for Tata Steel on land historically owned by them. Some of the villagers had been evicted without adequate relocation. Police retribution was brutal: 37 protesters were injured and 13 killed, including 3 women and a 13-year-old boy. One policeman was hacked to death by a mob after police had opened fire on protestors with tear gas and rubber bullets. Family members of the deceased villagers later claimed that the bodies had been mutilated during post-mortem examinations.

=== Supplies to Myanmar's military regime ===
In December 2006, Myanmar's chief of general staff, General Thura Shwe Mann, visited the Tata Motors plant in Pune. In 2009, Tata Motors announced that it would manufacture trucks in Myanmar. Tata Motors reported that these contracts to supply hardware and automobiles to Burma's military were subsequently criticised by human rights activists.

=== Singur land acquisition ===
The Singur controversy in West Bengal was a series of protests by locals and political parties over the forced acquisition, eviction, and inadequate compensation to those farmers displaced for the Tata Nano plant, during which Mamata Banerjee's party was widely criticised as acting for political gain. Despite the support of the Communist Party of India state government, Tata eventually pulled the project out of West Bengal, citing safety concerns. Narendra Modi, then Chief Minister of Gujarat, made land available for the Nano project.

On 31 August 2016, in a historic judgement, the Supreme Court of India set aside the land acquisition by the West Bengal Government in 2006 that had facilitated Tata Motors' Nano plant, stating that the West Bengal government had not taken possession of the land legally, and were required to repossess and return it to local farmers within 12 weeks without compensation.

=== Dhamra Port, Odisha ===
The Dhamra Port has received significant coverage, sparking controversy in India, and in Tata's emerging global markets. The Dhamra port, an equal joint venture between Tata Steel and Larsen & Toubro, has been criticised for its proximity to the Gahirmatha Sanctuary and Bhitarkanika National Park by Indian and international organisations, including Greenpeace; Gahirmatha Beach is one of the world's largest mass nesting sites for the olive ridley turtle, and India's second largest mangrove forest, Bhitarkanika, is a designated Ramsar site, and critics claimed that the port could disrupt mass nesting at Gahirmtha beaches as well as the ecology of the Bitharkanika mangrove forest. Tata Steel employed mitigation measures set by the project's official advisor, the International Union for Conservation of Nature (IUCN), and the company pledged to "adopt all its recommendations without exception" when conservation organisations asserted that a thorough environmental impact analysis had not been done for the project, which had undergone changes in size and specifications since it was first proposed.

=== Proposed soda extraction plant in Tanzania ===
In 2007, Tata Group joined forces with a Tanzanian company to build a soda ash extraction plant in Tanzania. Environmental activists oppose the plant because it would be near Lake Natron, and it has a very high chance of affecting the lake's ecosystem and its neighbouring dwellers, jeopardising endangered lesser flamingo birds. Lake Natron is where two-thirds of lesser flamingos reproduce. Producing soda ash involves drawing out salt water from the lake, and then disposing the water back to the lake. This process could interrupt the chemical makeup of the lake. 22 African nations signed a petition to stop its construction.

=== Radia tapes ===
In 2010, Tata Group was involved in the Radia tapes controversy, a political and corporate scandal involving lobbyist Niira Radia, whose public relations firm Vaishnavi Corporate Communications counted Tata among its most prominent clients alongside Reliance Industries. The Income Tax Department recorded approximately 5,851 telephone conversations involving Radia over a period of 300 days in 2008–09, as part of investigations into alleged money laundering and tax evasion. The tapes were subsequently leaked to the press and published by Outlook and Open magazines, revealing Radia's role as an intermediary between major corporate houses, politicians, and senior journalists.

Ratan Tata, then chairman of the group, personally appeared in some of the recorded conversations with Radia. In 2011, Ratan Tata filed a petition before the Supreme Court of India seeking to prevent certain conversations from being made public on grounds of privacy. A counter-petition was simultaneously filed by the NGO Centre for Public Interest Litigation seeking full public disclosure of the transcripts. The Supreme Court subsequently placed privacy restrictions on state investigative agencies in relation to the tapes.

Tata Teleservices, a Tata Group subsidiary, was drawn into the broader 2G spectrum case, with the group contesting allegations of irregular spectrum allocation. Radia subsequently closed Vaishnavi Corporate Communications in 2011 following the controversy.

=== Epic Systems trade-secret case judgement ===
In April 2016, a U.S. Federal grand jury awarded Epic Systems a $940 million judgement ($240 million in compensatory damages and $700 million in punitive damages) against Tata Consultancy Services (TCS) and Tata America International Corp. Filed 31 October 2014; the suit charged that a TCS employee had made "6,477 unauthorized downloads" while working at a hospital which "could be used to enhance Tata's competing product, Med Mantra." In 2017, U.S. District Court Judge William Conley reduced the award to $420 million ($140 million in compensatory damages and $280 million in punitive damages) due to Wisconsin state law; the company stated that they would appeal the judgement, as "not supported by evidence presented during the trial and a strong appeal can be made to superior court to fully set aside the jury verdict.” In 2020 the Seventh Circuit Court of Appeals affirmed the compensatory damages but recommended reducing the punitive damages to $140 million. Epic further appealed this to the Supreme Court but certiorari was denied.

=== 2018 NCLT verdict ===
In July 2018, the National Company Law Tribunal (NCLT), which "adjudicates issues relating to Indian companies," issued a verdict in the company's favour on charges of mismanagement leveled in 2016 by ousted chairman, Cyrus Mistry.

=== Apple iPhone 18 Pro leak ===
In June 2026, Tata Electronics, an affiliate wholly owned by Tata Group, disclosed a cyberattack in which more than 630 GB of data was reportedly stolen, including sensitive documents related to Apple’s iPhone supply chain. Reuters reported that the leaked material included details on components and suppliers for the iPhone 18 Pro, while Apple said it was investigating the incident and working with Tata on long-term security measures. The leaked Tata Electronics data reportedly included sensitive Apple supply-chain documents related to the iPhone 18 Pro, including information about components and suppliers. According to Reuters, the files described hundreds of parts, including chips on the main circuit board and elements used in the phone’s battery and cameras.

== See also ==
- List of companies of India
- List of largest companies by revenue
- List of corporations by market capitalization
- List of companies involved in the Gaza war
- Make in India
- Forbes Global 2000
- Fortune India 500
- Pallonji Mistry
- Radia tapes controversy
