= Mulshi Dam =

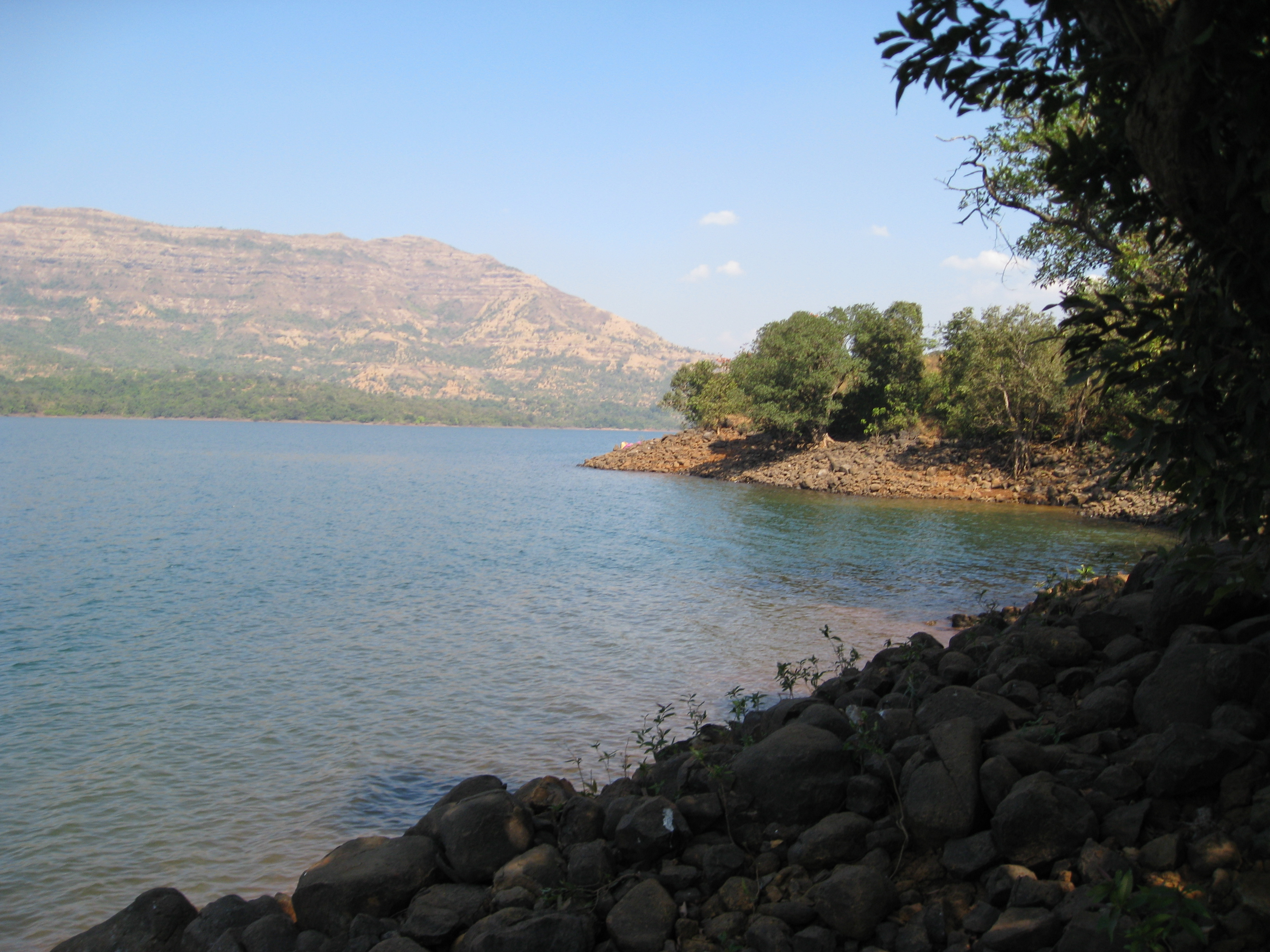
- Mulshi Dam near Pune

- Location within Maharashtra
- Official name: Mulshi Dam
- Location: Pune District, Maharashtra; India
- Coordinates: 18.5440654°N 73.4649509°E
- Opening date: 1927
- Owner: TATA

Dam and spillways
- Impounds: Mula River
- Height: 48.8 m (160 ft)
- Length: 1,533.38 m (5,030.8 ft)
- Spillway capacity: 1892 m^{3}/s

Reservoir
- Creates: Mulshi
- Total capacity: 0.0523 km^{3} (0.0125 cu mi)

Power Station
- Turbines: 6 x 25, 1 x 150
- Installed capacity: 300 MW

Mulshi is the name of a major dam on the Mula River in India. It is located in the Mulshi taluka administrative division of the Pune district of Maharashtra State.

Water from the dam is used for irrigation as well as for generating electricity at the Bhira hydroelectric power plant, operated by Tata Power. The station operates six 25MW Pelton turbines installed in 1927 and one 150MW Pumped Storage Unit. Water from this reservoir located in the Krishna River basin is diverted to the Bhira power house for generating Hydro electricity.

During the construction of the dam and power station, Vinayak Bhuskute and Pandurang Mahadev Bapat led Mulshi Satyagrah, a movement (April1921 to December1924) to represent farmers whose land had been taken to build the project. Pandurang Mahadev Bapat was dubbed Senapati (commander) in recognition of his leadership.

Although, a century has passed since the completion of the Dam, many of the demands of the aggrieved farmers are not full filled yet.

As per the agreement in the year 1937 between the Government and Tata Power Company under the Land Acquisition Act (1894), land acquired and compensation paid was as follows :

Sr. No.	Village name	Area( Acre-	Gunthe)	Compensation (Rs)
1	Adgaon	234	15	12180
2	Aharwadi	353	39	36789
3	Aksai	295	36	47857
4	Ambawane	082	23	03628
5	Awalas	811	1	156747
6	Barshe (Bu)	606	39	62396
7	Barshe (Khu)	355	19	39271
8	Bhadas (Khu)	372	12	65132
9	Bhamburde (Khu)	062	14	4610
10	Bhorkas	640	5	122805
11	Chachivali	240	20	58236
12	Chandivali	51	35	11781
13	Davadi	43	35	8000
14	Devloli	380	7	65742
15	Dhangol	59	25	11367
16	Gonavadi	211	25	67562
17	Kumbheri	380	39	29351
18	Male	32	39	3048
19	Mohori	411	18	85241
20	Mulapur	504	35	70575
21	Mulashi (Bu)	517	8	98439
22	Mulashi (Khu)	383	28	59320
23	Nandivali	384	00	120146
24	Naniwali	254	19	64770
25	Nimbarawadi	201	21	41524
26	Nive	143	18	39195
27	Niwarvande	281	21	66138
28	Palase	212	10	52785
29	Paritwadi	190	29	31427
30	Pimpri	157	19	12516
31	Pongaon	134	6	29399
32	Sambhave	64	9	5766
33	Sangavi	160	11	27843
34	Sarule	310	17	67524
35	Shedani	703	6	194960
36	Shirgaon	237	7	66386
37	Shiroli	587	33	126004
38	Tamhini (Bu)	184	33	18270
39	Tamhini (Khu)	215	22	27884
40	Tiskari	207	35	9056
41	Tista	145	13	20122
42	Wadagaon	485	29	84501
43	Wadawathar	540	36	111668
44	Welholi	231	15	31604
45	Wadaste	676	27	112259
46	Walane	708	11	156530
47	Wandre	241	2	31292
48	Warak	379	35	85412

Total land acquired is 15073 acres and 35 gunthas, paying compensation of Rs.27,55,082.

Apart from this, Rs. 377,403 was paid as compensation for houses, trees and temples. Thus, total compensation paid was Rs. 3,132,485.

== Tourism ==
In recent years Mulshi and adjoining areas have been developed as a tourist destination, adding accommodation for leisure guests. The place is around 2 hours drive from Pune and is a major attraction over the weekends. The best time of the year to visit Mulshi is from August to October.

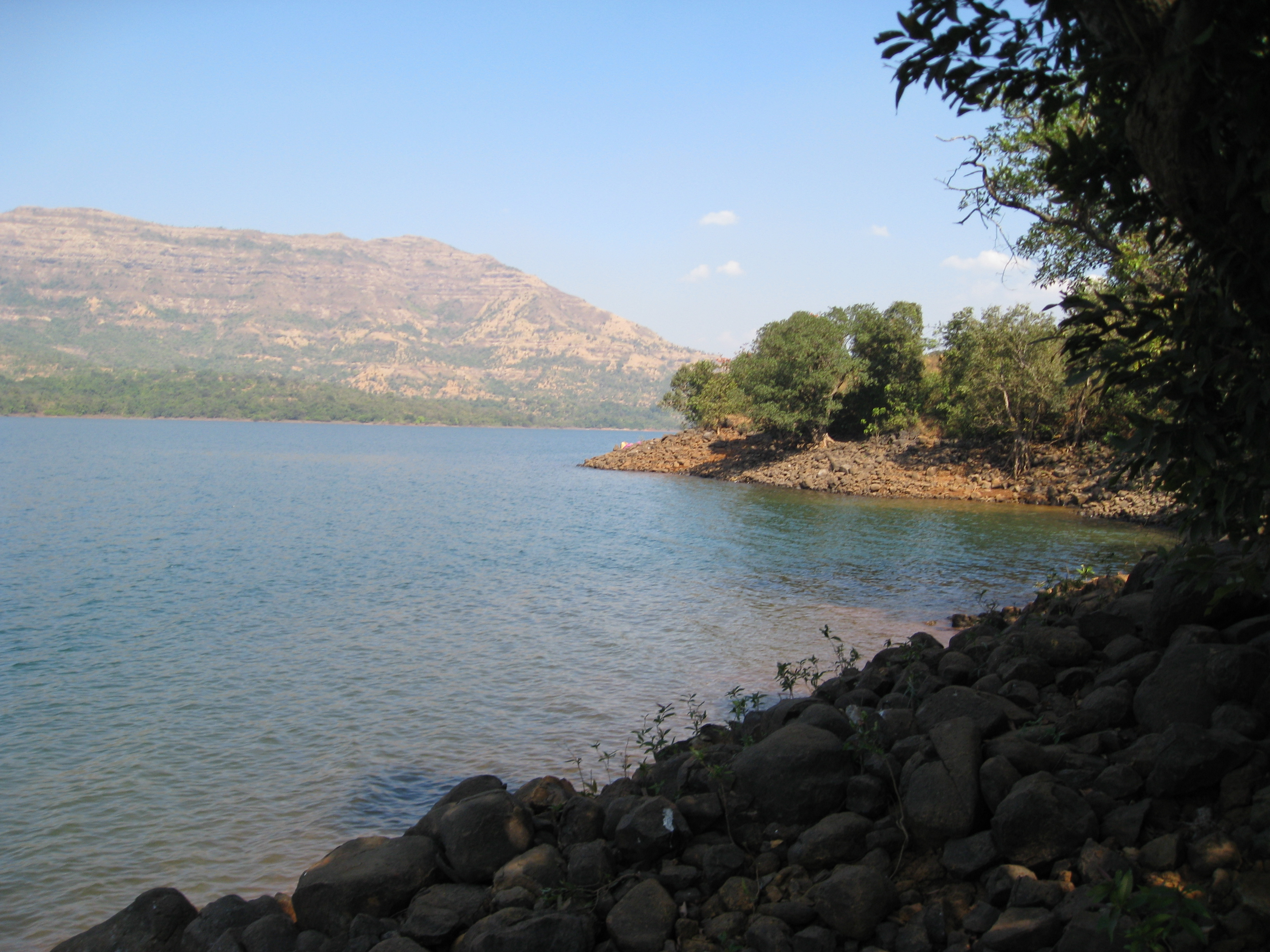
Mulshi Dam
