= Bira =

Bira may refer to:

== Places ==
=== Greece ===
- Boura (Achaea) (alternatively spelled Bira or Bura), an ancient city of Achaea, Greece

=== India ===
- Bira, North 24 Parganas, a census town in West Bengal, India
  - Bira railway station

=== Lebanon ===
- Bireh, Akkar
- Al-Bireh, Rashaya

=== Palestine ===
- Al-Bireh
- Ramallah and al-Bireh Governorate
- Al-Bira, Baysan, Palestinian village, depopulated 1948

=== Russia ===
- Bira, Russia, an urban-type settlement in the Jewish Autonomous Oblast, Russia
- Bira (river), a tributary of the Amur in the Jewish Autonomous Oblast, Russia

=== Syria ===
- Bira, al-Bab, Syrian village, Al-Bab District
- Bira, Manbij, Syrian village, Manbij District

=== Turkey ===
- Birecik, a town in Şanlıurfa Province, formerly known as Bira

== Other uses ==
- Biotin ligase (BirA), an enzyme used in biotechnology
- Bira (footballer) (born 1969), Brazilian association football player
- Prince Bira (1914–1985), motor racing driver
- Bira ceremony, a Shona spiritual ceremony where the ancestral spirits communicate with the living
- Bira language, a Bantu language of the Democratic Republic of the Congo
- Bira people, a tribe in eastern Democratic Republic of the Congo
- Bira Circuit, a motorsport venue in Thailand
- Emakumeen Euskal Bira, a women's cycling race held in the Basque region of Spain
- Ubirajara Penacho dos Reis (1934–2019), a Brazilian musician (Programa do Jô) known as Bira
- Ubiratan Pereira Maciel (1944–2002), Brazilian basketball player known as Bira
- Bira 91, a craft beer brand

== See also ==
- Birra (disambiguation)
- Bhira (disambiguation)
- Beer (disambiguation)
