= Bhira Hydroelectric Project =

- Hydroelectric Project
- Location in Maharashtra, India Bhira Hydroelectric Project (Maharashtra)
- Coordinates: 18°27.29′N 73°23.4′E
- Country: India
- State: Maharashtra

Languages
  - Official: Marathi
- Time zone: UTC+5:30 (IST)

The Bhira Hydroelectric Project is an electricity-generating complex in Bhira, Maharashtra state, India. It generates power using water from the nearby Mulshi Dam. Bhira lies approximately 150 km from Mumbai. Its construction was completed in 1927.

== Specifications ==
The plant's maximum output capacity is nominally 300 MW, generated by six 25 MW Pelton turbines and a 150 MW pumped storage generator added in 1997. In 2014 two 10 kW microturbine units were added to generate further power from the tailrace after the main turbines.

== Awards ==
In 2007, the Central Electricity Authority (CEA) awarded a Silver Shield to the Bhira facility's operators, Tata Power, as the second-best performing power station in the country. The plant received a further Silver Shield in the following year.

== Location ==
Bhira's rural location makes it a leisure destination for Mumbai residents.

== Climate ==
The following climate data is for Bhira village in which the plant is located.

Climate data for Bhira (1991-2020)
Month	Jan	Feb	Mar	Apr	May	Jun	Jul	Aug	Sep	Oct	Nov	Dec	Year
Record high °C (°F)	40.5 (104.9)	47.5 (117.5)	46.5 (115.7)	49.0 (120.2)	47.5 (117.5)	44.0 (111.2)	38.3 (100.9)	37.9 (100.2)	40.0 (104.0)	42.1 (107.8)	42.1 (107.8)	40.0 (104.0)	49.0 (120.2)
Mean daily maximum °C (°F)	33.3 (91.9)	35.7 (96.3)	39.0 (102.2)	39.7 (103.5)	38.4 (101.1)	32.4 (90.3)	28.4 (83.1)	27.6 (81.7)	30.4 (86.7)	34.2 (93.6)	34.8 (94.6)	33.5 (92.3)	34.1 (93.4)
Mean daily minimum °C (°F)	16.8 (62.2)	17.1 (62.8)	19.9 (67.8)	23.1 (73.6)	25.4 (77.7)	24.3 (75.7)	23.3 (73.9)	22.9 (73.2)	22.4 (72.3)	22.3 (72.1)	19.6 (67.3)	17.8 (64.0)	21.2 (70.2)
Record low °C (°F)	5.6 (42.1)	5.1 (41.2)	8.1 (46.6)	13.6 (56.5)	17.6 (63.7)	16.1 (61.0)	15.2 (59.4)	15.1 (59.2)	15.0 (59.0)	11.0 (51.8)	9.1 (48.4)	6.8 (44.2)	5.1 (41.2)
Average rainfall mm (inches)	1.6 (0.06)	0.0 (0.0)	0.2 (0.01)	5.3 (0.21)	18.4 (0.72)	734.2 (28.91)	1,754.5 (69.07)	1,387.9 (54.64)	599.6 (23.61)	152.1 (5.99)	17.9 (0.70)	3.3 (0.13)	4,674.9 (184.05)
Average rainy days	0.1	0.0	0.1	0.4	1.1	18.7	28.9	27.7	18.5	6.7	1.0	0.2	103.4
Average relative humidity (%) (at 17:30 IST)	41	33	33	38	47	80	90	91	82	68	64	56	60
Source: India Meteorological Department

Bhira has a tropical monsoon climate (Am) with little to no rainfall from November to May and extremely heavy rainfall from June to September when it is affected by the Arabian Sea branch of the South-west monsoon with moderately heavy rainfall in October.
