= Birra =

Birra may refer to:

- Al-Bireh, historically known as Birra, a city in Palestina
- Al-Bireh, Rashaya, historically known as Birra, a town in Lebanon
- Ali Birra (born 1947), Oromo singer and poet

== See also ==
- , mostly names of brewing companies
- Bira (disambiguation)
