= Tata Mutual Fund =

Indian bank sponsored fund house

- Type: Private Limited
- Industry: Investment management
- Founded: March 1994
- Headquarters: Mumbai, India
- Area served: India
- Key people: Anand Vardarajan (MD & CEO), Mr. Rajiv Sabharwal (Chairman), Rahul Singh (CIO)
- Products: Asset Management; Wealth Management
- AUM: ▲₹1,119,756.6 crore (US$120 billion) (September 2024)
- Owner: Tata Group
- Website: www.tatamutualfund.com

Tata Mutual Fund is an Indian private asset management company introduced by the Tata Group and incorporated in 1994 with its corporate head office located in Mumbai, India. It manages mutual funds, portfolio management services, and retirement solutions.

== History ==
The mutual fund industry in India originally began in 1963 with the Unit Trust of India as a Government of India and the Reserve Bank of India initiative. Tata Mutual Fund was launched in March 1994, and became non-UTI mutual fund in India. The business is registered under registration number INP000001058. The registration number for Tata Asset Management Ltd. as a mutual fund is MF/023/95/9. It also runs Tata Asset management (Mauritius) Pvt. Ltd. a foreign institutional investor (FII) that is registered with SEBi under registration number INMUFD161207.

== Fake Identity of TMF ==
Several fraudulent websites, mobile applications, and WhatsApp groups were created using the name of Tata Mutual Fund.

In May 2024, Tata Mutual Fund released a public caution notice warning investors and partners about fraudulent websites, mobile apps, and WhatsApp groups.

== See also ==
- Mutual funds in India
- Government of India
