= Trombay Thermal Power Station =

Coal-based thermal power plant

- Country: India
- Location: Maharashtra
- Coordinates: 19°00′07″N 72°53′54″E
- Commission date: 1984
- Owner: Tata Power
- Operator: Tata Power

Power generation
- Nameplate capacity: 930 MW

Trombay Thermal Power Station is a coal-based thermal power plant located at Trombay near Mumbai in the Indian state of Maharashtra. Opened in 1984, the power plant is owned by Tata Power. Its tallest chimney belongs with a height of 274.32 metres (900 ft) to the tallest chimneys in India.

The station is considered to be one of the key sources of air pollution in Mumbai.

== Capacity ==
It has an installed capacity of 1430 MW. It has following generating units:

- 62.5 MW + 62.5 MW + 62.5 MW + 150 MW Oil (unit 1 to unit 4).
- 500 MW Coal (unit 5).
- 500 MW running on oil (unit 6).
- 180 MW Gas based (unit 7)
- 250 MW Coal (unit 8).

The first 4 units and unit 6 have been decommissioned and are no more functional.
