= Tata Cliq =

Indian e-commerce company

Tata CLiQ
- Company type: Private
- Website type: E-commerce; Fashion; Marketplace
- Available in: English, Hindi
- Founded: 27 May 2016; 10 years ago
- Headquarters: Mumbai, Maharashtra, India
- Area served: India
- Owner: Tata Digital
- Key people: Gopal Asthana (CEO)
- Industry: E-commerce; Internet; Retail; Luxury Retail
- Services: Online shopping
- Parent: Tata Unistore Limited
- Advertising: No
- Commercial: Yes
- Registration: Required
- Current status: Active
- Native clients on: Android iOS

Tata CLiQ (stylised as TΛTΛ CLiQ) is an Indian e-commerce company based in Mumbai, India. It is owned by Tata Digital, under the Tata Group. Tata CLiQ operates in categories such as Fashion, Footwear, and Accessories. Tata Group's E-commerce platform, Tata CLiQ.

== History ==
Tata CLiQ was launched on 27 May 2016. It tied up with Genesis Luxury Fashion to sell international luxury brands and partnered with Adobe for digital shopping. It launched Tata CLiQ Luxury, a luxury fashion and lifestyle venture, in December 2016. In mid-2022, Tata CLiQ exited its consumer electronics business, with the division being integrated with Croma, Tata’s flagship consumer electronics retail chain.

On May 24, 2017, Tata CLiQ collaborated with American clothing brand Brooks Brothers.

Indian film actress Twinkle Khanna became the brand ambassador of Tata Clique for 2025.

== Business Model ==
TataCLiQ has an omni-channel marketplace model. Tata CLiQ is the flagship digital commerce initiative of the Tata Group, the India-headquartered global conglomerate with over US$100 billion in annual revenue.

== Tata CLiQ Luxury ==
Tata CLiQ has a luxury fashion brand named Tata CLiQ Luxury which houses apparel and accessories for men and women by luxury and bridge-to-luxury brands.

On Feb19 2024, Tata CLiQ Luxury launched the ReLoved Store, which primarily serves used luxury watches.

In August 2025, Tata Clique Luxury with Sabyasachi launched first digital jewellery boutique in India. In September 2025, Tata Clique Luxury along with HSBC launched Luxe Avenue boutique.

== See also ==
- E-commerce in India
- Online shopping
- Retail-Westside, Tanishq, 1 mg, Zudio etc.
- Omnichannel order fulfillment
