= TajAir =

Indian air charter company

IATA	ICAO	Call sign
-	-	-
- Founded: 1992; 34 years ago
- Hubs: Chhatrapati Shivaji Maharaj International Airport
- Fleet size: 3
- Parent company: Tata Sons
- Headquarters: Mumbai, India
- Key people: Mehernosh Kapadia (Chairman)
- Website: www.tajair-tata.aero

TajAir is an Indian air charter company owned by the Tata Group. It is registered with the Directorate General of Civil Aviation as a non-scheduled operator. It was founded as Megapode Airlines Ltd. on 11 November 1993 and started operations as TajAir on 9 August 2002.

It owns and operates a hangar and an exclusive passenger lounge at the General Aviation (GA) Terminal of Chhatrapati Shivaji Maharaj International Airport, Mumbai.

== Fleet ==
The TajAir fleet as of March 2016 includes:

- 3 Dassault Falcon 2000
