= Tata Interactive Systems =

Company

MPS Interactive Systems (previously known as Tata Interactive Systems)
- Type: Privately held company
- Industry: ed-tech
- Founded: 1990; 36 years ago
- Founder: Sanjaya Sharma
- Defunct: 2018; 8 years ago
- Fate: Acquired by MPS Limited
- Headquarters: Mumbai, India
- Area served: Worldwide
- Services: E-learning services and solutions
- Number of employees: 300
- Parent: MPS Limited
- Website: www.mpsinteractive.com

Tata Interactive Systems (TIS) was an Indian developer of custom e-learning based in Mumbai, India. It was founded by Sanjaya Sharma in 1990. The company was acquired by MPS Limited (a publishing and content platform developer) in June 2018. The company was represented across the United States, Canada, Australia, New Zealand, Brazil, the Middle East, India, the United Kingdom, The Netherlands and Switzerland. TIS' offered corporations, universities, schools, publishers and government institutions training including simulations, story based learning, courseware and curriculum design & development, special-needs education, assessment tools, electronic performance support systems (EPSS), mobile learning, game-based learning, consulting services and training outsourcing services. Until the acquisition, TIS was a part of the $100 billion Tata Group.

TIS was the only e-learning organization in the world to be assessed at Level 5 in both the SEI-CMM (Carnegie Mellon University Software Engineering Institute’s Capability Maturity Model) and P-CMM (People-Capability Maturity Model) frameworks.

== History ==
Tata Interactive Systems was founded in 1990 as part of the Tata Group, with Sanjaya Sharma serving as its founder and CEO. In 2013, it had acquired Tertia Edusoft AG (Switzerland) and Tertia Edusoft GmbH (Germany) from the Tertia Group.

In January 2013, Tata Interactive Systems launched ClassEdge, a learning platform for the Indian school education sector, with an initial investment of ₹100 crores from Tata Industries.

In April 2018, MPS Limited acquired Tata Interactive Systems (TIS) India along with its Swiss and German subsidiaries, Tata Interactive Systems AG and Tata Interactive Systems GmbH, for ₹80 crore ($12.3 million).
