= Tayo Rolls =

Metal fabrication and processing company from Jamshedpur, India

Tayo Rolls Limited
- Company type: Subsidiary
- Traded as: BSE: 504961
- Founded: 1968; 58 years ago
- Fate: Insolvent
- Headquarters: Jamshedpur, Jharkhand, India
- Key people: Anand Sen (chairman); Om Narayan (managing director)
- Products: Cast rolls, forged rolls, special castings, pig iron
- Parent: Tata Steel
- Website: www.tayo.co.in

Tayo Rolls Limited (formerly Tata-Yodogawa Limited) is a now insolvent metal fabrication and processing company headquartered in Jamshedpur, India, and was a subsidiary of Tata Steel. Tayo Rolls' products were primarily cast rolls, forged rolls, special castings and pig iron.

== History ==
Tata-Yodogawa Limited was founded in 1968 as a joint venture between Tata Steel and the Japan-based Yodogawa Steels.

Shares in Tata-Yodogawa were offered to the public in 1969.

In September 1989, Tata-Yodogawa formed a technical alliance with the Austria-based Eisenwerk Salzauwerfen.

In 1995 Tata-Yodogawa began the production of special castings for power plants.

The name of the company was changed to Tayo Rolls in December 2003.

In January 2010 Tayo Rolls opened a new facility for the manufacture of forgings and forged rolls, constructed at a cost of Rs 168 crore.

== Operations ==
In the fiscal year ended 31 March 2010 Tayo Rolls produced 6,516 tons of rolls, 22,604 tons of pig iron, and 16 tons of special castings. The company has announced its closure. It plans to close its operation in September 2016.
