= Punjab Solar Summit =

- ਪੰਜਾਬ ਦੇ ਸੂਰਜੀ ਸੰਮੇਲਨ 2015
- Type: Environment
- Established: 23 July 2015
- President: Bikram Singh Majithia
- Location: Chandigarh, Punjab, India
- Website: Official Website

Punjab Solar Summit was a Government of Punjab hosted event in Chandigarh on July 23, 2015 to bring prospective entrepreneurs, investors and other stake holders on a common platform.

== Making farmers' entrepreneurs ==
The New and Renewable Energy Minister, Bikram Singh Majithia, elected in Punjab had announced when he took over as Minister for New and Renewable Energy (Punjab) that he has a dream to make Punjab a solar state and the state is now in sniffing distance from realising its dream. The dream encompasses a major agenda for investors to invest in Punjab and for farmers to become entrepreneurs because they can sell extra energy so generated at assured rates to Punjab State Power Corporation and supplement their incomes.

== Who will participate? ==
Executives from major companies like Punj Lloyd Limited, LancoInjfratech Limited, Azure Power India Limited, Welspun Renewables Limited, Essel Infra Projects Limited, Solairedirect Energy India Private Limited, International Switchgears Private Limited, Madhav Solar Private Limited, Northstar Solar Power Private Limited, IK Energy Private Limited, Aditya Medisales Limited from Sun Pharma Group, Focal Energy India Private Limited, NextgenSolux Power Private Limited, Atma Power Private Limited, Abundant Ventures LLC, T.R.Energy& Agro Private Limited, Earth Solar Private Limited, Allianz Eco Power Limited and Mokia Green Energy Private Limited are expected to attend the Summit.

== Solar projects commissioned ==
Company Name	CAP. (MW)
M/s. Punj Lloyd Ltd.	21
M/s. LancoInfratech Ltd.	10.5
M/s. Azure Power India Pvt. Ltd.	34
M/s. Welspun Renewables Ltd.	33.5
M/s. Essel Infra Projects Ltd.	31.5
M/s. Solairedirect Energy India Private Limited (Subsidiary of Solairdirect SA France)	21
M/s. International Switchgears Pvt. Ltd.	4.2
M/s. Northstar Solar Power Pvt. Ltd.	4.2
M/s. IK Energy Pvt. Ltd.	1
M/s. Aditya Medisales Ltd. Investment by SUN PHARMA GROUP	4.2
M/s. Focal Energy India Pvt ltd	4.2
M/s. NextgenSolux Power Pvt. Ltd.	1
M/s. Atma Power Pvt. Ltd.	2.1
M/s. Abundant Ventures LLC	2
M/s. T.R. Energy & Agro Pvt. Ltd.	2.1
M/s. Earth Solar Pvt. Ltd.	4.2
M/s. Allianz Eco Power Ltd.	2.1
M/s. Mokia Green Energy Pvt. Ltd.	4.2
DeraRadha Swami Satsang Beas Distt. Amritsar	30

== Green Power Revolution ==
The Green Revolution changed the face of agriculture and now it is the turn of Green Power Revolution to catapult power scenario because solar power is both clean power and green power. One unit of thermal or coal power emits about 825 grams of carbon dioxide. However, in case of solar power, no carbon dioxide is emitted. The Punjab Solar Summit 2015 is the foremost step towards the Green Power Revolution.
