= Tata Oil Mills Company =

Public limited company and part of Tata Group

- Company type: Subsidiary
- Founded: 10 December 1917; 108 years ago
- Founder: Dorabji Tata
- Defunct: 28 December 1994; 31 years ago
- Fate: Acquired and absorbed by Hindustan Lever Limited
- Headquarters: Bombay, India
- Parent: Tata Group

Tata Oil Mills Company also known as TOMCO, was a public limited company and part of Tata Group.

== Overview ==
It was incorporated on 10 December 1917 with head office at Bombay by Dorabji Tata. It was into manufacture and sale soaps, detergents, cooking oils, glycerine, cattle and poultry feeds, de-oiled meals, oil cakes and fish products. The manufacturing units were spread over India in Maharahstra, West Bengal, Kerala, Bihar, Uttar Pradesh, Gujarat and Tamil Nadu. In 1952, Lakmé was started as a 100% subsidiary of Tata Oil Mills by JRD Tata.

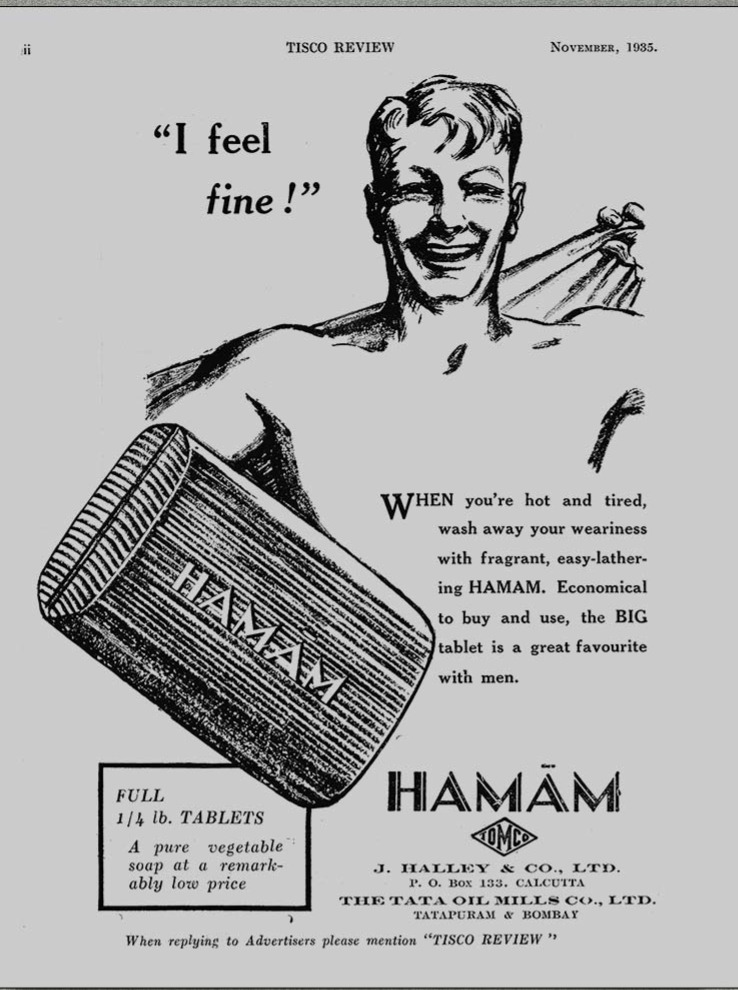
Hamam soap advertisement from 1935

The company owned famous bathing soap brands like Hamam, Okay, Moti to name a few, they also had a detergent brand named as Magic. During early 1990s Tata's wanted to move out of businesses that did not meet their long term strategy and TOMCO was sold to their competitors Hindustan Lever Limited and it was amalgamated into HLL on 28 December 1994 with retrospective effect from 1 April 1993.
