= Cromā =

Indian electronics retail company

Infiniti Retail Limited
- Trade name: Cromā
- Industry: Retail
- Founded: 9 October 2006
- Headquarters: Mumbai, Maharashtra, India
- Number of locations: 550+
- Area served: India
- Key people: Shibashish Roy (CEO)
- Products: Consumer electronics
- Revenue: ▲₹19,064 crore (US$2.0 billion) (2025)
- Net income: ▲₹−1,091 crore (US$−110 million) (2025)
- Parent: Tata Digital
- Website: www.croma.com
- Footnotes; Financials as of 31 March 2025.

Infiniti Retail Limited, doing business as Cromā, is an Indian retail chain of consumer electronics and durable goods. It is a subsidiary of Tata Digital.

Croma has more than 550 stores in over 200 cities in India, in addition to its online presence.

== History ==
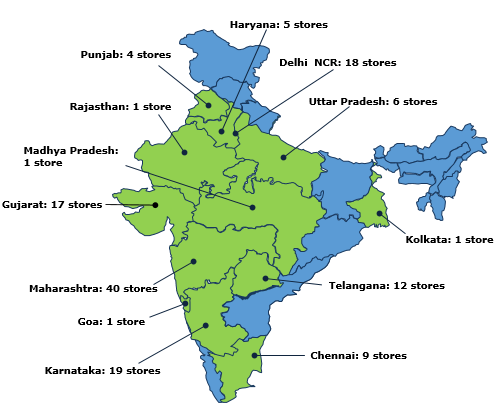
Croma stores by state

Infiniti Retail Ltd was incorporated in October 2006 as a wholly owned subsidiary of Tata Sons, with the first Cromā store opening in Juhu, Mumbai, the same month.

In 2008, Infiniti Retail Ltd started its private label consumer electronics and durables brand, also called Croma, in partnership with supplier Woolworths Wholesale. In 2012, Infiniti Retail Ltd acquired the Indian business of Woolworths Wholesale for A$35 million or ₹200 crore.

In 2021, Tata Sons announced that it would transfer its 100% ownership in Infiniti Retail Ltd (Cromā) to Tata Digital.
