= Grid Corporation of Odisha =

- Company type: Government
- Industry: Electricity Transmission
- Founded: 1995; 31 years ago
- Headquarters: Grid Corporation of Odisha Building; Janpath, Bhubaneswar, Odisha, India
- Area served: Odisha, India
- Key people: Shri Hemant Sharma, IAS CMD
- Products: Electricity
- Website: www.gridco.co.in

Grid Corporation of Odisha or GRIDCO was incorporated as a Public Sector Undertaking of Government of Odisha on 20 April 1995 under the Companies Act, 1956. Grid Corporation of Odisha (GRIDCO) got the Certificate of Commencement of Business on 6 July 1995 and started functioning as a subsidiary of Odisha Electricity Regulatory Commission, a Government of Odisha Power Utility. Grid Corporation of Odisha (GRIDCO) does business of transmission and bulk supply of electricity and other related activities under an exclusive license issued by Odisha Electricity Regulatory Commission.
