= Maithon Power Plant =

Electricity generation plant in India

Maithon Power Limited
- Country: India
- Location: Maithon, Jharkhand
- Coordinates: 23°49′13″N 86°45′36″E
- Status: Running
- Operators: Tata Power & Damodar Valley Corporation

Thermal power station
- Primary fuel: Coal

Power generation
- Units operational: 2 X 525 MW
- Nameplate capacity: 1050 MW

Maithon Power Limited (MPL) is an electricity generation plant. It is a joint venture of Tata Power & Damodar Valley Corporation. The venture implemented 1050 MW (2X525 MW units) in Nirsa District Dhanbad in the Indian state of Jharkhand. This project is India’s first 525 MW unit thermal power plant using subcritical technology. It is a coal-based thermal power plant and the first PPP venture plant in the country. This project is India's first Public Private power project.

Cities, towns and locations in the eastern portion of Dhanbad Sadar subdivision in Dhanbad district
M: Municipality, CT: Census town, N: Neighbourhood, R: Rural/ Urban centre, D: Dam, P: Power Plant
Owing to space constraints in the small map, the actual locations in a larger map may vary slightly

As per the bidding norms, the Project was designed to run on Indian coal. The Project is expected to benefit close to 16 million domestic consumers, apart from supplying cost competitive power to industry and agriculture.

The Project will supply power to New Delhi, Jharkhand, West Bengal and Kerala as per the long term power purchase agreement. It will provide a competitive source of power and help meet these states’ growing demand for electricity. Power from the project will help improve the competitiveness of the manufacturing and services industries.

== Capacity ==
It has an installed capacity of 1050 MW.

Unit No.	Generating Capacity	Commissioned on	Status
U#1	525 MW	2011 September	Running
U#2	525 MW	2012 July	Running
