= Bhira Kheri =

Town in Uttar Pradesh, India

Coordinates: 28.0°N 81.0°E

Bhira Kheri is a town located in the Lakhimpur Kheri district of Lucknow division, in the Uttar Pradesh state of India. It is situated 35 km away from the Indo-Nepal border.

Bhira is the largest nagar panchayat, in terms of area, in the Lakhimpur Kheri district. It is rich in natural resources with lush green scenery. The main source of water is the Sarda River.

== Geography ==
- Latitude : 27.6 to 28.6 (North)
- Longitude : 80.34 to 81.30 (East)

It shares its boundaries with:

- North – Palia Kalan (15km)
- West – Kishanpur forest (2km)
- South – Mailani (16km)
- East – Bijua (15km).

== Government and politics ==
- Parliamentary Constituencies - Kheri (Lok Sabha constituency)
- Tehsils - Palia.
- Blocks - Bijuwa.
- Nagar Panchayat-Bhira.

Nagar Panchayat Chairman - Mrs. Charu Shukla W/O Mr.Sanjay Shukla

== Education ==
Education is available at the Junior and Senior Basic Schools, Senior Secondary Schools and college level. Secondary schools include Vivekanand Academy (ICSE), Maharaja Agarsen Academy, Akal Academy Santgarh, Global Academy, Faith Academy, Chhaju Ram Cane Growers Inter College & Zila Panchayat Inter College Aadarsh Janta inter college. There are also degree colleges such as Manmeet Nagar degree college, Smrati Mahavidyalaya and One Beat Medical College.

== Economy ==
Bhira-Kheri is home to small and medium-sized industries helping the economy and boosting employment. Nearby rice mills and sugar mills are important sources of employment; the Bajaj Hindustan Sugar Mill is just 15 km away. Groceries, garments, jewelry, stationary, and more are available at the Bhira-Kheri market.

== Food ==
Bhira-Kheri has many street vendors and restaurants serving local delicacies. Mirch-ka-pakora and Gobhi-ka-Pakora are among the most popular food among locals.
