= Tata Power =

Indian electric utility company

Tata Power Company Limited
- Type: Public
- Traded as: NSE: TATAPOWER; BSE: 500400
- Industry: Electric utility
- Founded: 18 September 1919; 107 years ago
- Founder: Dorabji Tata
- Headquarters: Bombay House, 24 Homi Mody Street, Mumbai, Maharashtra, India
- Key people: Praveer Sinha (MD & CEO)
- Products: Electrical power & Natural gas
- Services: Electricity generation and distribution, natural gas exploration, production, transportation and distribution
- Revenue: ▲₹66,992 crore (US$7.0 billion) (FY2025)
- Operating income: ▲₹11,326 crore (US$1.2 billion) (FY2025)
- Net income: ▲₹4,775 crore (US$500 million) (FY2025)
- Total assets: ▲₹156,711 crore (US$16 billion) (FY2025)
- Total equity: ▲₹42,606 crore (US$4.4 billion) (FY2025)
- Number of employees: 23,652 (2024)
- Parent: Tata Group
- Subsidiaries: Tata Power Solar; Tata Power Delhi Distribution Limited (TPDDL); TP Central Odisha Distribution Limited (TPCODL); Western Electricity Supply Company of Odisha (TPWODL); North Eastern Electricity Supply Company of Odisha (TPNODL); TP Southern Odisha Distribution Limited (TPSODL); TP Ajmer Distribution Limited; Tata Power Renewable Energy Limited; Tata Power Trading Company Limited
- Website: www.tatapower.com
- Footnotes; Financials as of 31 March 2025.

Tata Power Company Limited is an Indian electric utility and electricity generation company, based in Mumbai and part of the Tata Group. With an installed electricity generation capacity of 14,707 MW from thermal power and green energy sources, it is India's largest integrated power company. In February 2017, Tata Power became the first Indian company to ship over 1 GW solar modules.

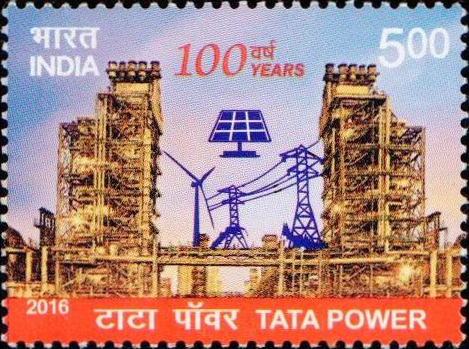
A 2016 stamp dedicated to the 100th anniversary of Tata Power

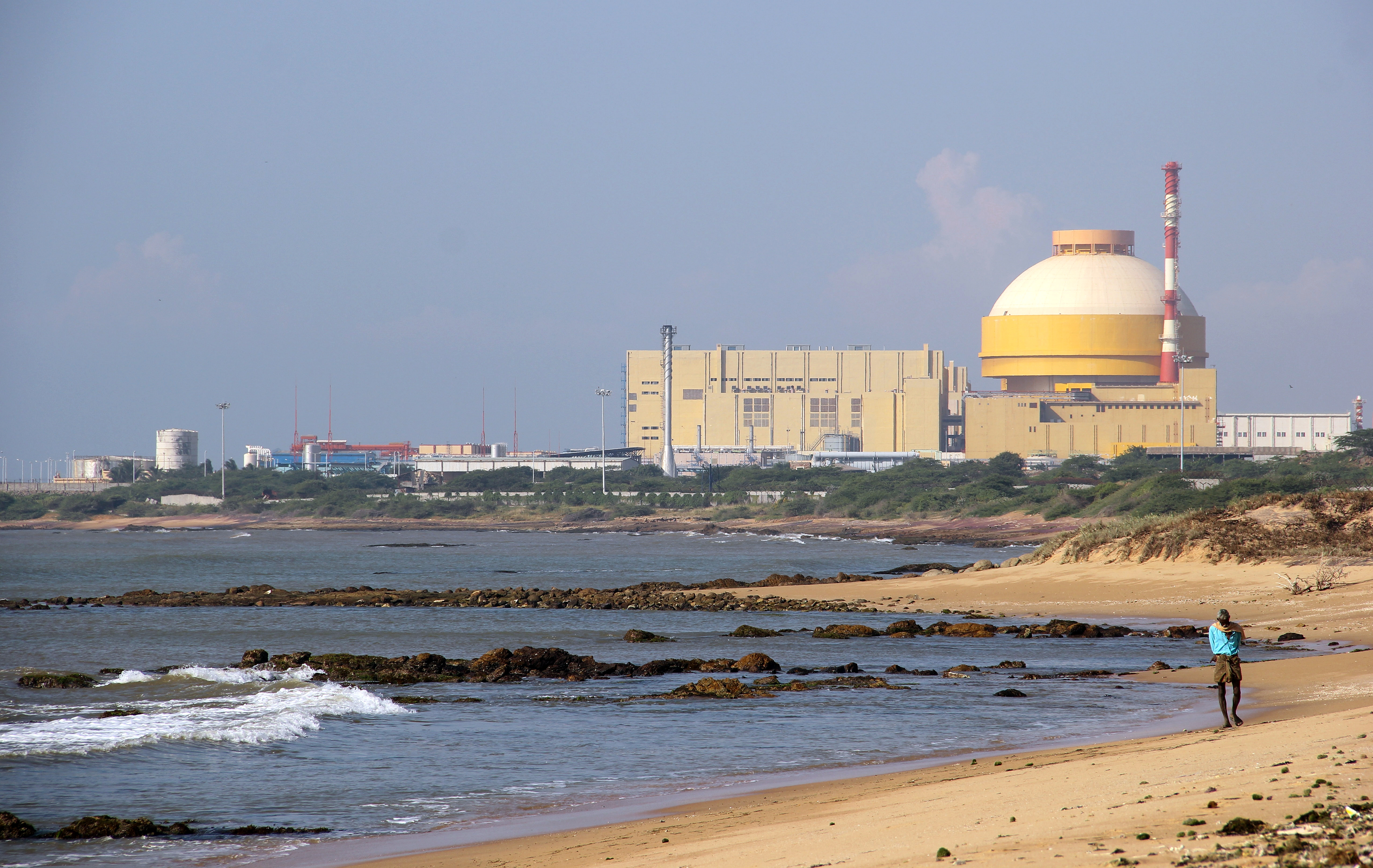
The Kudankulam Nuclear Power Plant (KKNPP)

== History ==
The firm started as the Tata Hydroelectric Power Supply Company in 1910, which amalgamated with the Andhra Valley Power Supply Company in 1916. It commissioned India's Second hydro-electric project in 1915 in Khopoli for 72 MW. Then second and third power plants were installed in Bhivpuri (75 MW) in 1919 and Bhira (300 MW) in 1922.

== Operations ==
Tata Power has operations in India, Singapore, Indonesia, South Africa, Zambia, Georgia, Mauritius and Bhutan. Tata Power Group has its operations based in 20 locations in India.
The thermal power stations of the company are located at Trombay in Mumbai, Mundra in Gujarat, Jojobera and Maithon in Jharkhand, Kalinganagar in Odisha, Haldia in West Bengal and Bangalore in Karnataka. The hydro stations are located in the Western Ghats of Maharashtra and the wind farms in Ahmednagar, Supa, Khanke, Brahmanwel, Gadag, Samana and Visapur. The company installed India's first 500 MW unit at Trombay, the first 150 MW pumped storage unit at Bhira, and a flue gas desulphurization plant for pollution control at Trombay. It has generation capacities in the States of Jharkhand and Karnataka, and a distribution company in Delhi, servicing over one million consumers spread over 510 square km in the North Delhi. The peak load in this area is about 1,150 MW. Tata Power announced on 24 July 2012, commissioning of the second unit of 525 MW capacity of the Maithon mega thermal project in Dhanbad. The first unit of identical capacity was commissioned in September 2011.

It also has a distribution company in Ajmer, Rajasthan and produces Green Energy in Rajasthan which includes 755 MW of solar energy (Tata Power Solar) and 185 MW of Wind Energy taking total green energy generation to 940 MW.

Tata Power has established a 4.3 gigawatt (GW) solar module manufacturing plant near Tuticorin in Tamil Nadu which is expected to be fully functional by end of October, 2024.

=== Major power plants ===
- Mundra Ultra Mega Power Plant. A 4,000 MW (5×800 MW) coal-based thermal power plant at Mundra, Kutch district, Gujarat. This plant is fully functional.
- Trombay Thermal Power Station. A 1,580 MW thermal power plant at Trombay, near Mumbai, Maharashtra. This plant is fully functional.
- Maithon Power Plant. A 1,050 MW (2×525 MW) coal-based thermal power plant at Maithon, Dhanbad, Dhanbad district, Jharkhand. This plant is fully functional. This power plant is owned by Maithon Power Limited a 74:26 joint venture between Tata Power and Damodar Valley Corporation.
- Jojobera Power Plant. A 427.5 MW (67.5 MW and 3×120 MW) coal-based thermal power plant at Jojobera in Jamshedpur, East Singhbhum district, Jharkhand. This plant is fully functional.

=== International operations ===
The company has executed overseas projects in the Middle East, Africa and South East Asia including:

- Jebel Ali 'G' station (4×100 = 400 MW + desalination plant) in Dubai
- Al-Khobar II (5×150 = 750 MW + desalination plant) in Saudi Arabia
- Jeddah III (4×64 = 256 MW + desalination plant) in Saudi Arabia,
- Shuwaikh (5×50 = 250 MW) in Kuwait
- EHV substations in UAE and Algeria
- Power plant operation and maintenance contracts in Iran and Saudi Arabia.
- Tata Power has a Russian subsidiary, namely Far Eastern Natural Resources LLC, that has a license for a coal mine in Kamchatka Krai.

== Problems ==
In cause of dramatically higher coal prices as assumed in the plannings and a fixed price arrangement the Mundra plant in 2012 made big losses. After three successive years of losses as a result, cash flow was becoming an issue for the company. In January 2014 the company sold a 30 percent stake in Indonesian coal company PT Arutmin for $500 million. In July 2014 it signed an option to sell a 5 percent stake in Indonesian coal company Kaltim Prima Coal for $250 million. As of March 2024, Tata Power's consolidated debt stood at Rs.49,480 crore.

== Future projects ==
Tata Power has a 51:49 joint venture with PowerGrid Corporation of India for the 1,200 km (750 mi) Tata transmission project, India's first transmission project executed with public-private partnership financing.

Tata Power has plans to expand generation capacity of 4,000 MW Mundra plant, the country's first operational ultra mega power project, to 5,600 MW.

The company also has a 74:26 joint venture with Damodar Valley Corporation for 1,050 MW coal-based thermal power plant at Maithon in Dhanbad district of Jharkhand, named as Maithon Power Limited. Both units were commissioned on 24 July 2012. It has another 74:26 joint venture with Tata Steel Limited for thermal power plants to meet the captive requirements of Tata Steel, under name Industrial Energy Limited.

Tata Power has announced its partnership with Sunengy an Australian firm to build India's first floating solar plant based on Liquid Solar Array technology.

In 2016, Tata Power made significant inroads into the renewable energy market in India by means of its acquisition of Welspun Renewables, for a record price of $1.3 billion, the largest acquisition in the Indian renewables sector.

Tata Power bagged a 25-year licence for distribution and retail supply of electricity in Odisha's five circles, together constituting Central Electricity Supply Utility of Odisha (CESU) for about Rs 175 crore.

On December 11, 2023, Tata Power and Indian Oil Corporation announced a partnership to establish over 500 electric vehicle (EV) charging points across India, aiming to enhance the country's EV infrastructure and facilitate intercity travel for EV users.

On 17th September 2024, CEO Praveer Sinha informed that the company planned to invest up to $9 billion to more than quadruple its renewable energy capacity to more than 20 gigawatts (GW) over the next five to six years.

== Shareholding ==
As on 25 December 2023, Tata Group held 32.46% shares in Tata Power. Around 210,000 individual shareholders hold approx. 16% of its shares. Life Insurance Corporation of India is the largest non-promoter shareholder in the company with 12.90% shareholding.

Shareholders	Shareholding
Promoters: Tata Group companies	32.46%
Foreign Institutional Investors	23.67%
Insurance Companies	19.45%
Individual shareholders	16.04%
GDRs	3.70%
Others	4.68%

The equity shares of Tata Power are listed on the Bombay Stock Exchange, where it is a constituent of the BSE SENSEX index, and the National Stock Exchange of India, where it is a constituent of the NIFTY 50.
Its Global Depository Receipts (GDRs) are listed on the London Stock Exchange and the Luxembourg Stock Exchange.

== See also ==
- Kundali River – Kundli Pumped Storage Plan
- Solar power in India
- Maharashtra Electricity Regulatory Commission
- Tata Power Delhi Distribution
- Plug-in electric vehicles in India
