= North Eastern Electricity Supply Company of Odisha =

State-owned utility firm in Odisha, India

TP Northern Odisha Distribution Limited
- Type: Public Private Partnership
- Industry: Electric power distribution
- Founded: 1 April 2021; 5 years ago
- Headquarters: Balasore, Odisha, India
- Area served: Odisha, India
- Key people: Dwijadas Basak (Chief Executive Officer)
- Products: Electricity
- Website: www.tpnorthernodisha.com

TP Northern Odisha Distribution Limited or TPNODL was incorporated as a private company under PPP (public-private partnership) model with the collaboration of Tata Power and Government of Odisha on 1 April 2021 to carry out the distribution and retail supply business of electricity in the entire North Eastern Odisha, including the 5 districts: Balasore, Mayurbhanj, Keonjhar, Jajpur, and Bhadrak. TPNODL is erstwhile known as NESCO was primarily incorporated under the Companies Act, 1956 and started functioning as a subsidiary of Tata Power and Grid Corporation of Odisha (GRIDCO), a Government of Odisha Power Utility, from 26 November 1998 under Distribution and Retail Supply License.
