= Tata Housing Development Company =

Indian real estate development company

- Type: Private company
- Industry: Real estate
- Founded: Mumbai, India (1984)
- Founder: Ratan Tata
- Headquarters: Mumbai, India
- Area served: India
- Key people: Sanjay Dutt MD
- Revenue: ▲₹140 crore (US$15 million) (2024)
- Net income: ▼₹−364 crore (US$−38 million) (2024)
- Website: www.tatarealty.in

Tata Housing Development Company (THDC) is a fully owned subsidiary of Tata Sons, a holding company of the Tata Group.

== Background ==
The company was established in 1984 by the late JRD Tata. It was revived in 2006 under the leadership of Brotin Banerjee, Managing Director and CEO of Tata Housing Development Company Limited. Its current Managing Director is Sanjay Dutt.

Since 2006 the company has developed into one of leading real estate development company and has built many landmark projects across India. Tata Housing pioneered the concept of low-cost housing aimed at the economically weaker section of society. It pioneered the concept of sustainable green development with its first commercial project – Xylem in Bengaluru (Bengaluru's first sustainable IT park). The project was awarded a gold certification by LEED, and since then every project of Tata Housing, from low-cost housing and affordable housing to ultra premium luxury projects, are all sustainable green developments certified by the Indian Green Building Council.

The company currently has 45 million sq.ft under various stages of development.

In 2010, Tata Housing launched Tata Value Homes, its 100% subsidiary to cater to low-cost and affordable housing in India in the price range of Rs. 4–10 Lacs, with the vision of bridging the huge shortfall of over 26 million households in India.

== Projects ==
The company has constructed many projects – integrated mixed use townships, commercial/retail complexes, budget housing and premium luxury housing projects.

The projects have been constructed in major Indian cities – Kolkata, Gurugram, Mumbai, Bhubaneswar, Pune, Bangalore, Cochin among others.
