= Western Electricity Supply Company of Odisha =

Electricity distribution joint venture

TP Western Odisha Distribution Limited (TPWODL)
- Type: Joint venture
- Industry: Electricity Distribution
- Founded: 1 January 2021; 5 years ago
- Headquarters: Sambalpur, Odisha, India
- Area served: Odisha, India
- Key people: Shri Parveen Verma, CEO
- Products: Electricity
- Owner: Tata Power (51%); Government of Odisha (49%)
- Website: www.tpwesternodisha.com

TP Western Odisha Distribution Limited (TPWODL) is a joint venture between Tata Power and the Government of Odisha with the majority stake being held by The Tata Power Company Limited (51%). The Discom TPWODL serves a population of 88 lacs with a customer base of more than 21 lacs. It has a vast distribution area in the Western part of Odisha covering 48,373 km^{2} across nine revenue districts of Odisha such as Bargarh, Bolangir, Debagarh, Jharsuguda, Kalahandi, Nuapada, Sambalpur Sonepur and Sundergarh. It procures power from Grid Corporation of Odisha (GRIDCO) at 33KV at various supply points and maintains extensive 33KV, 11KV and LT overhead networks for distribution of electric supply over its entire area of operation. For making reliable power supply, along with prompt service to its consumers, this power distribution company in Odisha has divided its area of power distribution into 5 Circles and 17 Divisions as under: -

- Bolangir Circle consisting of Bolangir, Titilagarh, Sonepur Divisions.
- Sambalpur Circle consisting of Sambalpur, Sambalpur (East), Jharsuguda, Brajrajnagar and Deogarh Electrical Divisions.
- Bargarh Circle consisting of Bargarh & Bargarh West Electrical Divisions.
- Rourkela Circle consisting of Rourkela, Rourkela Sadar, Rajgangpur & Sundargarh Electrical Division.
- Kalahandi Circle consisting of Kalahandi East, Kalahandi West and Nuapada Electrical Division.

In Odisha, Tata Power is into power distribution along with Government of Odisha in a joint venture in all four zones namely TPWODL (for Western Odisha), TPSODL (for Southern Odisha), TPNODL (for Northern Odisha) and TPCODL (for Central Odisha respectively). In all these four distribution companies, Tata Power has held 51% stake as the major stakeholder. Under its distribution fold, Tata Power provides electricity supply to more than 1.2 Cr. electricity consumers in India (Mumbai, Delhi, Ajmer, Central Odisha, Western Odisha, Northern Odisha and Southern Odisha).

[TPWODL - A power distribution company in Odisha at a Glance]

- 88 Lakh Population Served.
- 21.42 Lakh Customer Base.
- 48,373 km^{2} Distribution Area.

[Status as on 31.03.2021]

- Total Energy Input (In MU)- 7,625
- Aggregate Technical & Commercial Loss(%)- 27.33%
- 33KV Lines- 4,918 Circuit Km
- 11KV Lines- 46,766 Circuit Km
- Low Tension Lines- 55,286 Circuit Km
