= TP Central Odisha Distribution Limited =

Indian electrical utility company

TP Central Odisha Distribution Limited (TPCODL)
- Type: Public-Private Partnership (PPP) Model
- Industry: Distribution
- Founded: TPCODL: 1 June 2020 (erstwhile CESU: 1999)
- Headquarters: Bhubaneswar, Odisha, India
- Area served: Odisha, India
- Key people: Arvind Singh (CEO)
- Products: Electrical Power
- Services: Electricity generation and distribution Renewal, PM Solar
- Owner: Tata Power (51.00%); Government of Odisha (49.00%)
- Website: www.tpcentralodisha.com

TP Central Odisha Distribution Limited (TPCODL), earlier Central Electricity Supply Utility of Odisha (CESU), is an electric utility serving the central region of state of Odisha in India.

Electricity Regulatory Commission under the provision of Odisha Electricity Reform Act, 1995 to Central Electricity Supply Company of Odisha Ltd. However, the licence was revoked in April 2005, and the management was shifted under Central Electricity Supply Utility of Odisha (operation and management) in September 2006. The company provides daily power requirement to the state load dispatch center which monitors and controls the grid operations.

Tata Power Limited, a subsidiary of Tata Group, took over the management of Central Electricity Supply Utility (CESU) from 1 June 2020. The Odisha Electricity Regulatory Commission (OERC) that awarded the Letter of Intent (LOI) to TPCL on 12 December 2019. Tata Power holds 51 per cent equity with management control and the State-owned Gridco will have the remaining 49 per cent equity stake in the company. The company retained all the existing employees of CESU and will govern them by their existing policy structure. Tata Power has received a licence for 25 years. Spread over 30,000 km^{2}, CESU has five electrical circles consisting of the areas of Bhubaneswar (Electrical Circle - I and II), Cuttack, Paradip and Dhenkanal with a population of over 1.4 crore and consumer base of 2.5 million. With CESU, Tata Power aims to expand its consumer base to 5 million consumers from the present base of 2.5 million across Mumbai, Delhi and Ajmer. After the acquisition it no longer remains a PSU under the Government of Odisha.
