= List of awards and nominations received by Amitabh Bachchan =

List of awards received by Amitabh Bachchan
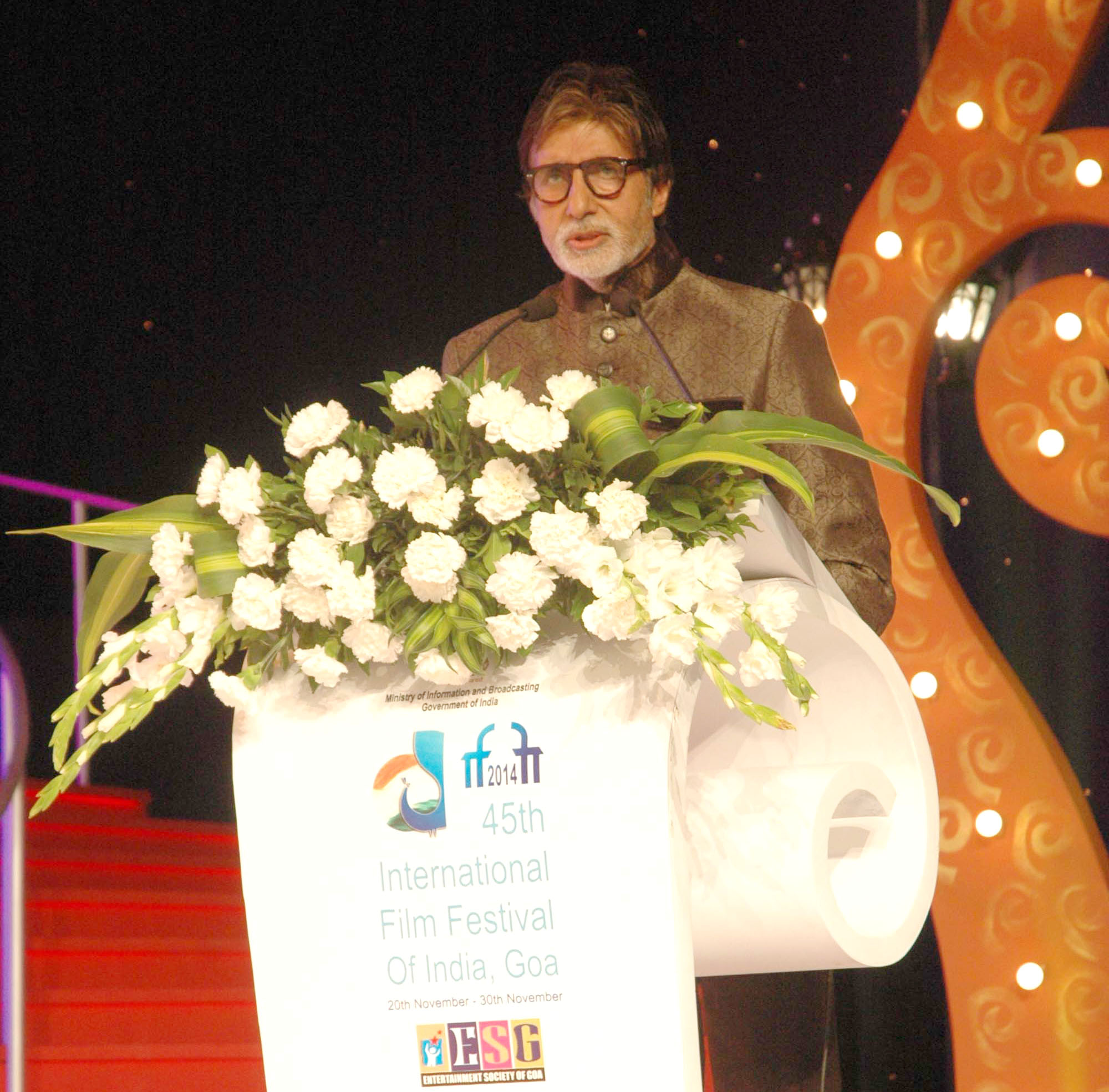
- Bachchan at the 45th International Film Festival of India (IFFI-2014) in Panaji, Goa, India
Awards and nominations
Award	Wins	Nominations
Asian Film Awards	1	0
National Film Awards	7	7
Filmfare Awards	17	47
Apsara Film & Television Producers Guild Awards	4	2
Bengal Film Journalists' Association Awards	2	0
IIFA Awards	6	11
Bollywood Movie Awards	3	0
Stardust Awards	12	0
BIG Star Entertainment Awards	7	0
Screen Awards	11	0
People's Choice Awards	1	0
Zee Cine Awards	6	7
Other awards, honours and recognitions	140	0
- Totals
Wins	240
Nominations	70	
- References

Amitabh Bachchan (IPA: [əmɪˈtaːbʱ ˈbəttʃən]; born 11 October 1942) is an Indian actor. He first gained popularity in the early 1970s for films like Zanjeer and Deewaar, and was dubbed India's first "angry young man" for his on-screen roles in Bollywood. Referred to as the "Shahenshah of Bollywood", "Star of the Millennium" or "Big B", he has since appeared in over 200 Indian films in a career spanning more than five decades. Bachchan is widely regarded as one of the greatest and most influential actors in the history of Indian cinema. So much was his dominance of the film scene in the 1970s and the 1980s that French director François Truffaut called him a "one-man industry."

Bachchan has won numerous accolades in his career, including 6 National Film Awards as Best Actor, 1st National Award for Best Newcomer in Saat Hindustani (1969), 2nd National Award for Best Actor in Agneepath (1991), 3rd National Award for Black (2006), 4th National Award for Paa (2010), 5th National Award for Piku (2016) & 6th National Award for Pink (2017) National Film Award For Best Feature Film in Hindi Language for Paa (Producer), Dadasaheb Phalke Award as lifetime achievement award and many awards at international film festivals and award ceremonies. He has won 16 Filmfare Awards and is the most-nominated performer in any major acting category at Filmfare, with 42 nominations overall and also won 11 Screen Awards.

Apart from the National Film Awards, Filmfare Awards and other competitive awards which Bachchan won for his performances throughout the years, he has been awarded several honours for his achievements in the Indian film industry. In 1990, he won the Filmfare Award for Agneepath. In 1991, he became the first artist to receive the Award, which was established in the name of Raj Kapoor. Bachchan was crowned as Superstar of the Millennium in 2000 at the Filmfare Awards. The Government of India awarded him with the Padma Shri in 1984, the Padma Bhushan in 2001 and the Padma Vibhushan in 2015. France's highest civilian honour, the Knight of the Legion of Honour, was conferred upon him by the French Government in 2007 for his "exceptional career in the world of cinema and beyond". In 2011, actor Dilip Kumar wrote in a blog, that Black should have been nominated for an Oscar. Kumar added: "If any Indian actor, in my personal opinion, deserves the world's most coveted award, it is you."

In 1999, Bachchan was voted the "Greatest Star of stage or screen of the Millennium" in a BBC Your Millennium online poll. In 2001, he was honoured with the Actor of the Century award at the Alexandria International Film Festival in Egypt in recognition of his contribution to the world of cinema. Many other honours for his achievements were conferred upon him at several International Film at the 2010 Asian Film Awards.

In 2003, he was conferred with the Honorary Citizenship of the French town of Deauville. In October 2003, he was conferred with the Medal of Honour of Morocco, given to him by King Mohammed at the Marrakech International Film Festival. In October 2003, Time magazine dubbed Bachchan as "the Undisputed Godfather of Bollywood". In April 2005, The Walter Reade Theater of Lincoln Center in New York honored Amitabh Bachchan with a special tribute, retrospective—titled "Amitabh Bachchan: The Biggest Film Star in the World". In March 2010, he has been named the list of CNN's "top 25 Asian actors of all time".

In June 2000, he became the first living Asian to have been modelled in wax at London's Madame Tussauds Wax Museum. Another statue was installed in New York in 2009, Hong Kong in 2011, Bangkok in 2011, Washington, DC in 2012 and Delhi in 2017.

He was honoured with an honorary doctorate by the University of Jhansi, India, in 2004, the University of Delhi in 2006, the De Montfort University in Leicester, UK, in 2006, the Leeds Metropolitan University in Yorkshire, UK, in 2007, the Queensland University of Technology in Brisbane, Australia, in 2011, the Jodhpur National University in 2013. and the Academy of Arts (Egypt), in 2015. In 2017, he was honored with the Indian Film Personality of the Year consisting of a Silver Peacock Medal, a certificate a Civilian award.

On 24 September 2019 he was awarded the prestigious Dadasaheb Phalake award for 2018 by government of India.

== Civilian awards ==
- 1984 – Padma Shri India's fourth highest civilian award from the Government of India.
- 1991 – Order of Afghanistan by the President of Afghanistan.
- 2001 – Padma Bhushan, India's third highest civilian honour from the Government of India.
- 2007 – officer of the Legion of Honour, France's highest civilian honour from the Government of France for his "exceptional career in the world of cinema and beyond". Describing Bachchan as a "towering Indian personality" and the "number-one actor of Indian cinema", Ambassador Girard said the award "brings Bachchan into the international legion of world's greatest artistes".
- 2015 – Padma Vibhushan, India's second highest civilian honour from the Government of India.

== Honorary doctorates ==
- 2004 – Honorary Doctorate by the Jhansi University, India.
- 2006 – Honorary Doctorate Degree on by his alma mater University of Delhi, India.
- 2006 – Honorary degree of Doctor of Arts by De Montfort University in Leicester, UK in recognition of his distinguished career in films. He is the first Indian star to be feted by a foreign university.
- 2007 – Honorary degree of Doctor of Arts by The University Brandan Foster by the Leeds Metropolitan University in Yorkshire, UK.
- 2011 – Honorary Doctorate by the Queensland University of Technology in Brisbane, Australia for his contribution to the world of entertainment.
- 2013 – Honorary Doctorate by the Jodhpur National University, India for his exceptional contribution to Indian Cinema.
- 2015 – Honorary Doctorate from the prestigious Academy of Arts (Egypt) for his contribution to cinema.
- 2018 – Honorary Doctorate from Rabindra Bharati University for his contribution to cinema.

== National honours ==
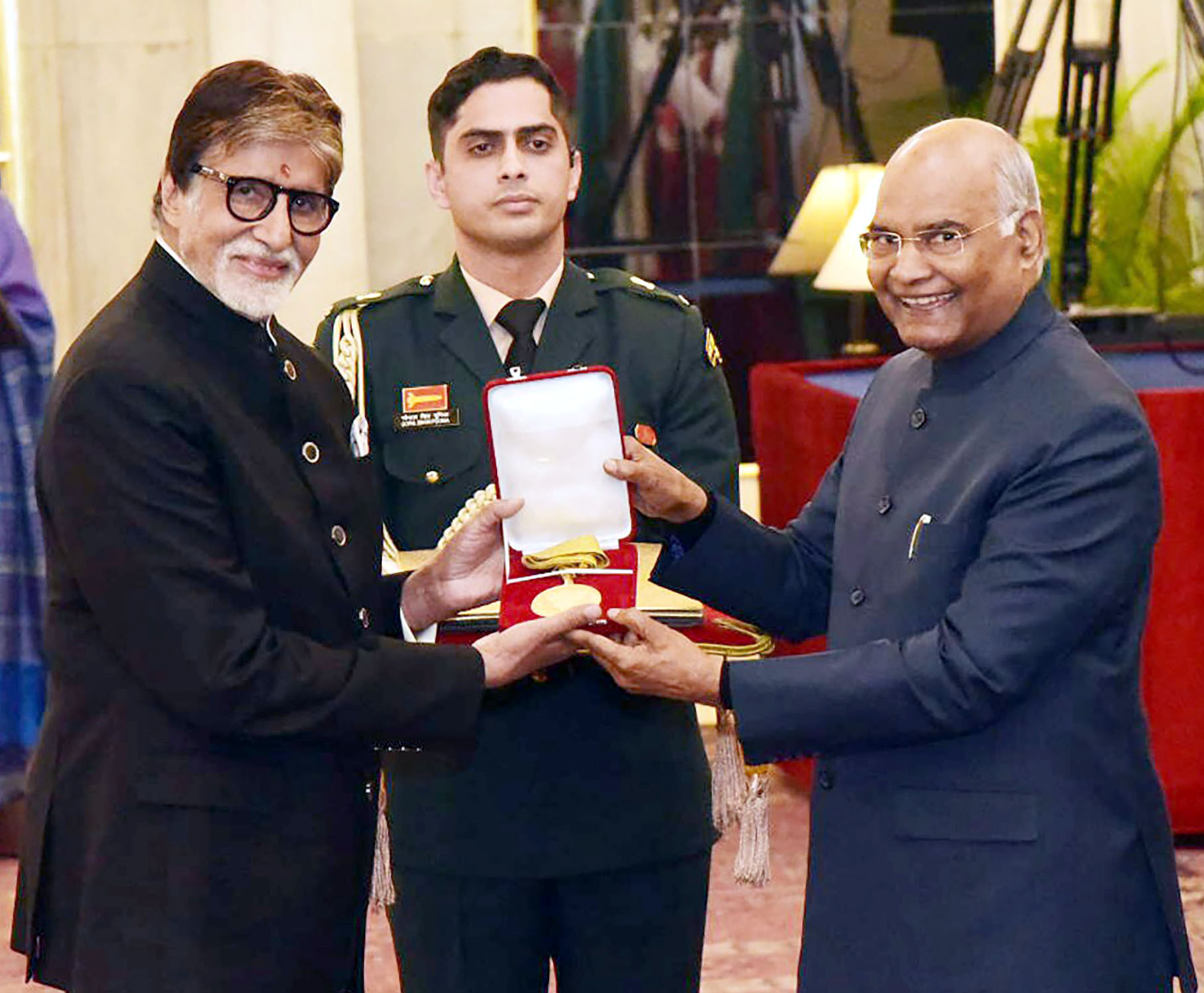
Bachchan being conferred with Dadasaheb Phalke Award

- 1980 – Awadh Samman by the Government of Uttar Pradesh.
- 1994 – Yash Bharati, Uttar Pradesh's highest honour from the Government of Uttar Pradesh.
- 2002 – "Dayawati Modi" Award. This award is among the highest awards in India in the field of Art, Culture and Education.
- 2002 – National Kishore Kumar Award by the Government of Madhya Pradesh for excellence in acting and his unparalleled contribution to the film industry.
- 2004 – "Living Legend" Award by the Federation of Indian Chamber of Commerce and Industry (FICCI) in recognition of his contribution to the Indian entertainment industry.
- 2005 – Deenanath Mangeshkar award for his contribution to films and music.
- 2009 – IIFA-FICCI Frames, "Most Powerful Entertainer of the Decade Award" for his contribution to Indian cinema.
- 2011 – "Abhinaya Chakravarthy" Award by the President of India Pratibha Patil.
- 2011 – "Maharashtrian of the Year-the Maanbindu" Award by the President of India Pratibha Patil.
- 2011 – NTR National Award in recognition of his outstanding contribution toIndian Cinema by the Government of Andhra Pradesh.
- 2013 – President of India 'Medallion of Honour' for contribution to 100 Years of Indian Cinema.
- 2014 – ANR National Award
- 2019 – Government of India confers Dadasaheb Phalke Award for the year 2018.

== National Film Awards ==
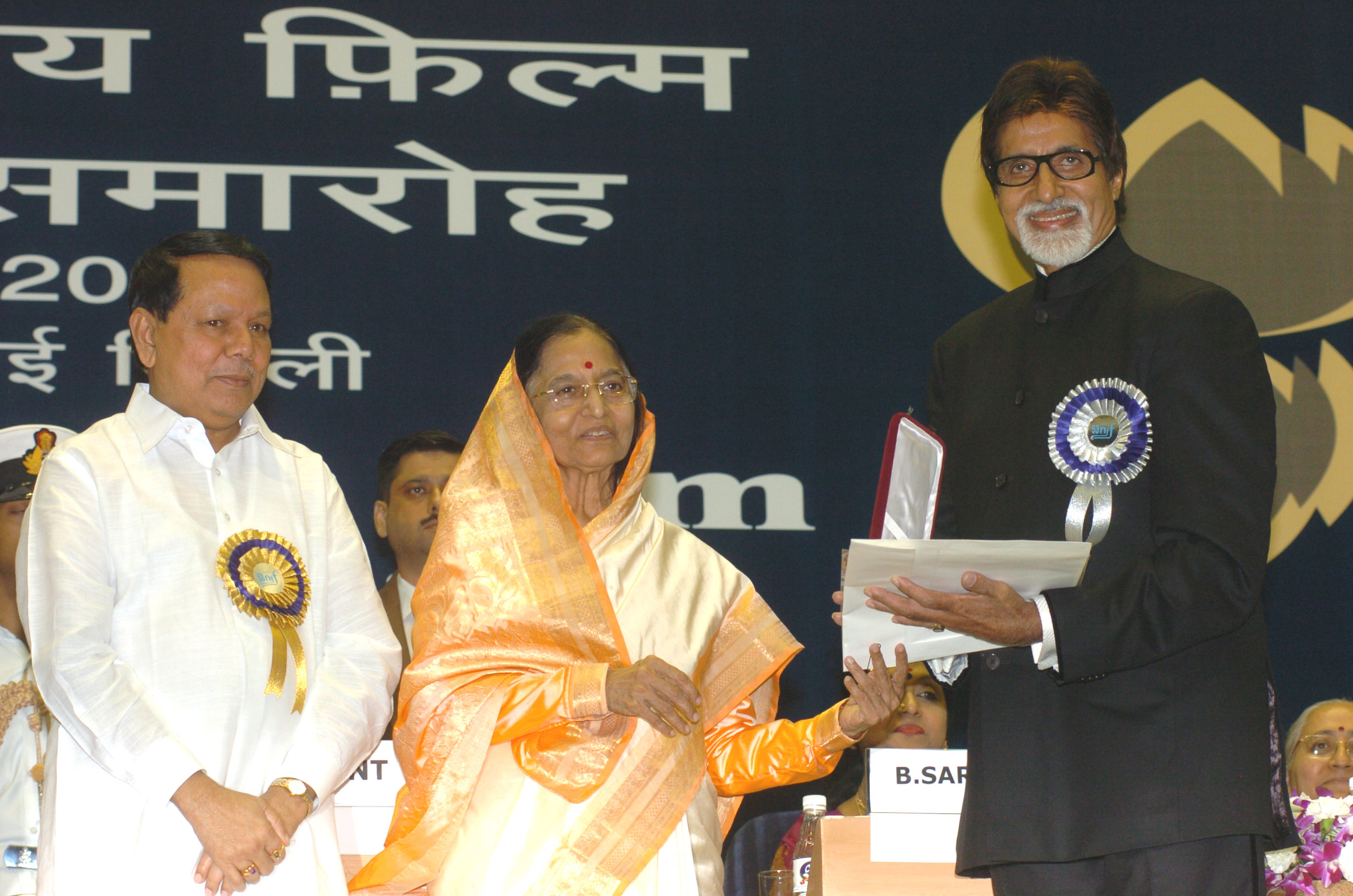
Bachchan in 53rd National Film Awards

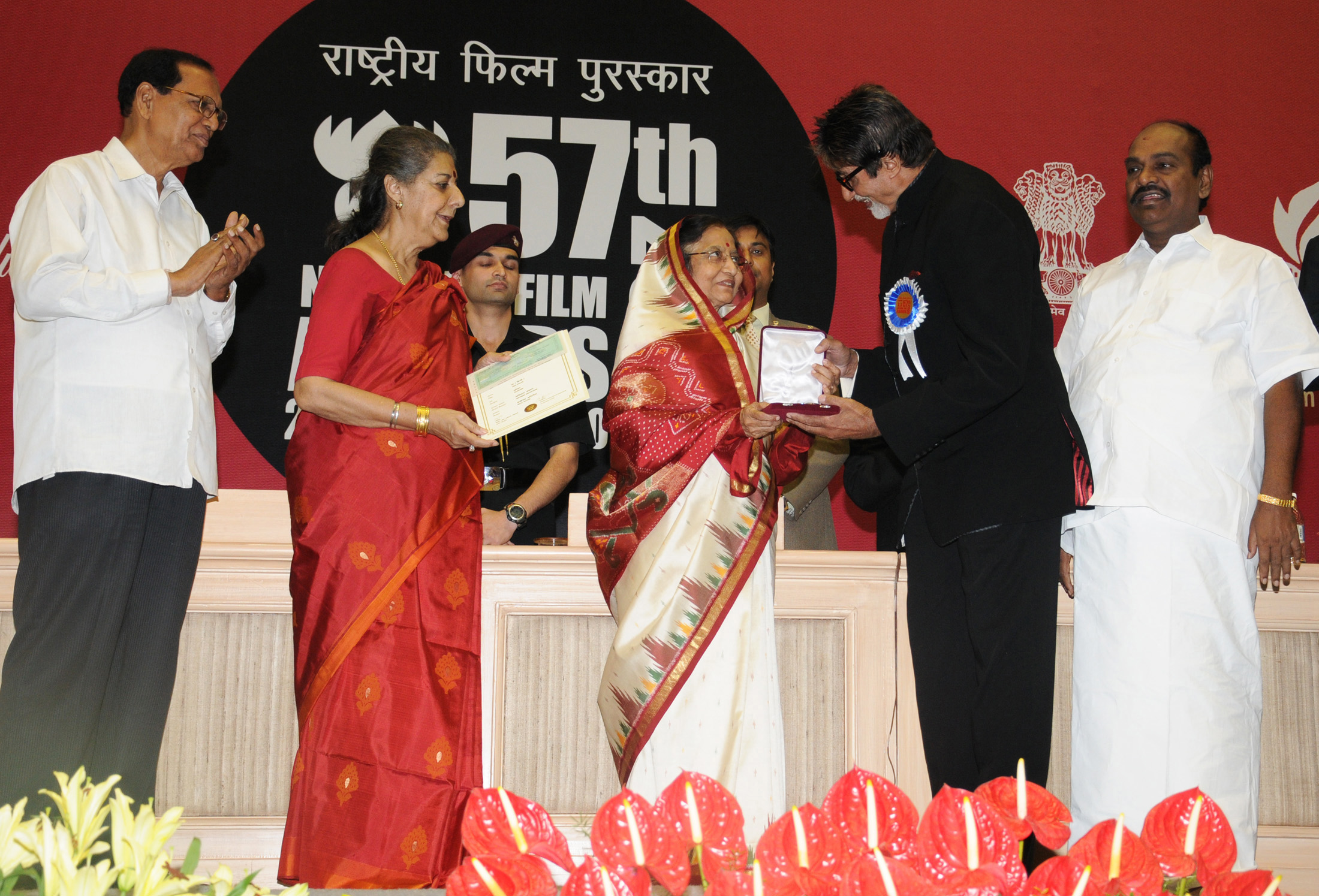
Bachchan in 57th National Film Awards

The National Film Awards is the most prominent film award ceremonies in India. Established in 1954, it is administered by the International Film Festival of India and the Indian government's Directorate of Film Festivals. The awards are presented by the President of India. Due to their national scale, they are considered to be the equivalent of the Academy Awards. Bachchan has received four awards (a record) in the Best Actor category and Dadasaheb Phalke Award.

Year	Category	Film
1969	Best Newcomer	Saat Hindustani
1990	Best Actor	Agneepath
2005	Best Actor	Black
2009	Best Actor	Paa
2015	Best Actor	Piku
2009	Best Feature Film (Hindi)	Paa (Producer)
2018	Dadasaheb Phalke Award	—N/a

== Asian Film Awards ==
Winner

- 2010 – Lifetime Achievement Award during the 4th Asian Film Awards in Hong Kong.

== Filmfare Awards ==
Year	Film	Result
Best Actor
1974	Zanjeer	Nominated
1976	Deewaar	Nominated
1977	Kabhie Kabhie	Nominated
1978	Adalat	Nominated
1978	Amar Akbar Anthony	Won
1979	Don	Won
1979	Muqaddar Ka Sikandar	Nominated
1979	Trishul	Nominated
1980	Kaala Patthar	Nominated
1980	Mr. Natwarlal	Nominated
1981	Dostana	Nominated
1982	Lawaaris	Nominated
1982	Silsila	Nominated
1983	Bemisal	Nominated
1983	Namak Halaal	Nominated
1983	Shakti	Nominated
1985	Sharaabi	Nominated
1986	Mard	Nominated
1989	Shahenshah	Nominated
1991	Agneepath	Nominated
1992	Hum	Won
1993	Khuda Gawah	Nominated
2002	Aks	Nominated
2003	Kaante	Nominated
2004	Baghban	Nominated
2005	Khakee	Nominated
2006	Black	Won
2006	Sarkar	Nominated
2010	Paa	Won
2012	Aarakshan	Nominated
2016	Piku	Nominated
2017	Pink	Nominated
2021	Gulabo Sitabo	Nominated
2023	Uunchai	Nominated
Best Supporting Actor
1972	Anand	Won
1974	Namak Haraam	Won
2001	Mohabbatein	Won
2002	Kabhi Khushi Kabhie Gham	Nominated
2003	Aankhen	Nominated
2005	Veer-Zaara	Nominated
2006	Bunty Aur Babli	Nominated
2007	Kabhi Alvida Naa Kehna	Nominated
Best Actor (Critics)
2002	Aks	Won
2006	Black	Won
2016	Piku	Won
2021	Gulabo Sitabo	Won
Honorary awards
1991	Lifetime Achievement Award	Won
2000	Superstar of the Millennium	Won
2004	Power Award	Won
2011	Special Award (for completing 40 years in the Indian film industry)	Won
2025	Special Award (Cine Icon Award)	Won

== Screen Awards ==
Winner

Year	Category	Film	Result
2003	Jodi No. 1 (with Hema Malini)	Baghban	Won
2003	Distinction in Acting Award	Baghban	Won
2004	Most Outstanding Personality	—N/a	Won
2005	Best Actor	Black	Won
2007	Best Actor (Critics)	Cheeni Kum	Won
2010	Best Actor	Paa	Won
2010	Jodi No. 1 (with Abhishek Bachchan)	Paa	Won
2013	Iconic Legend Award	—N/a	Won
2014	Lifetime Achievement Award	—N/a	Won
2015	Best Actor	Piku	Won
2017	Best Actor	Pink	Won

== IIFA Awards ==
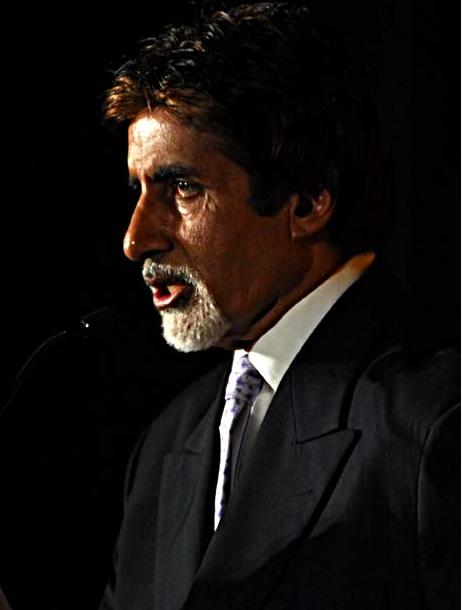
Bachchan at IIFA Awards press conference at Mumbai, India

Year	Category	Film	Results
2000	IIFA Special Honorary Award	—N/a	Won
2001	Best Supporting Actor	Mohabbatein	Won
2002	IIFA Personality of the Year	—N/a	Won
2002	Best Actor	Aks	Nominated
2002	Best Supporting Actor	Kabhi Khushi Kabhie Gham	Nominated
2003	Best Actor	Kaante	Nominated
2004	Best Actor	Baghban	Nominated
2005	Best Supporting Actor	Veer-Zaara	Nominated
2006	IIFA Wall of Fame	—N/a	Won
2006	Best Actor	Black	Won
2006	Best Actor	Sarkar	Nominated
2006	Best Supporting Actor	Bunty Aur Babli	Nominated
2007	Best Supporting Actor	Kabhi Alvida Naa Kehna	Nominated
2010	Best Actor	Paa	Won
2016	Best Actor	Piku	Nominated
2017	Best Actor	Pink	Nominated
2017	Best Supporting Actor	Wazir	Nominated

== Stardust Awards ==
Year	Category	Film	Result
2000	Best Artist of the Millennium by Hero Honda and Stardust (magazine)		Won
2003	Lifetime Achievement		Won
2004	Special Award	Baghban	Won
2005	Special Award	Black	Won
2006	Star of the Year Award - Male	Black	Won
2009	Best Actor	The Last Lear	Won
2010	Star of the Year Award – Male	Paa	Won
2011	Pride of the Industry Award		Won
2013	Star of the Century Award.		Won
2014	International Icon of the Year Award		Won
2015	Star of the Year Award – Male	Piku (along with Shamitabh)	Won
2016	Star of the Year Award – Male	Pink	Won

== South Indian International Movie Awards ==
Year	Category	Film	Result	Ref.
2025	Best Supporting Actor – Telugu	Kalki 2898 AD	Won	

== Bengal Film Journalists' Association Awards ==
Year	Category	Film	Result	Ref.
1976	Best Actor (Hindi)	Mili	Won	
2006	Best Actor (Hindi)	Black	Won	

== Zee Cine Awards ==
Year	Category	Film	Result
2001	Best Actor – Male	Aks	Nominated
2003	Lifetime Achievement	—N/a	Won
2003	Best Actor – Male	Aankhen	Nominated
2004	Golden Grade Award	—N/a	Won
2004	Best Actor – Male	Baghban	Nominated
2005	Best Actor – Male	Khakee	Nominated
2006	Best Actor – Male	Black	Won
2006	Best Actor – Male	Sarkar	Nominated
2008	Best Actor – Male	Cheeni Kum	Nominated
2016	Best Actor (Critics) – Male	Piku	Won
2017	Best Actor (Critics) – Male	Pink	Won
2017	Best Actor – Male	Pink	Nominated
2018	Legend Extraordinaire	—N/a	Won

== Bollywood Movie Awards ==
Year	Category	Film	Result
2001	Best Actor - Male (Critics)	Mohabbatein	Won
2003	Most Sensational Actor	Kaante	Won
2006	Best Actor (Male)	Black	Won

== Apsara Film & Television Producers Guild Awards ==
Year	Category	Film	Result
2004	Best Actor in a Leading Role	Khakee	Nominated
2006	Best Actor in a Leading Role	Black	Won
2008	Best Actor in a Leading Role	Cheeni Kum	Nominated
2010	Lifetime Achievement Award	—N/a	Won
2011	Best Actor in a Leading Role	Paa	Won
2012	Apsara Awards: Guild Honor For Excellence on TV	Kaun Banega Crorepati.	Won

== BIG Star Entertainment Awards ==
Year	Category	Film	Result
2010	Complete Entertainer of The Decade		Won
2011	Best Actor (Social Role)	Aarakshan	Won
2011	Complete Entertainer		Won
2013	Star of the Millennium		Won
2013	Best Actor (Social Role)	Satyagraha	Won
2014	Best Actor (Social Role)	Bhoothnath Returns	Won
2015	Most Entertaining Actor in a Drama Role (Male)	Piku	Won

== People's Choice Awards ==
Winner

- 2012 – Best Non-Fiction Show Host for Kaun Banega Crorepati

== Indian Television Academy Awards ==
Year	Category	Show	Result
2001	Best Host	Kaun Banega Crorepati (Season 1)	Won
2001	Best Anchor of a Game Show	Kaun Banega Crorepati (Season 1)	Won
2005	Best Anchor of a Game Show	Kaun Banega Crorepati (Season 2)	Won
2006	Best Anchor of a Game Show	Kaun Banega Crorepati (Season 2)	Won
2007	The ITA Laurel For ULTIMATE EMINENCE		Won
2010	Best Anchor Talk/Chat Show	Bigg Boss (season 3)	Won
2011	The ITA Achiever of The Year		Won
2011	Best Anchor Game/Quiz Show	Kaun Banega Crorepati (Season 5)	Won
2013	Best Anchor Game/Quiz Show	Kaun Banega Crorepati (Season 7)	Won

== Indian Telly Awards ==
Year	Category	Show	Result
2001	TV Personality of the Year 2000	Kaun Banega Crorepati	Won
2002	TV Anchor of The Year	Kaun Banega Crorepati	Won
2005	Best TV Anchor	Kaun Banega Crorepati	Won
2012	Best TV Anchor	Kaun Banega Crorepati	Won

== Indian Television Awards ==
Winner

- 2000 – Screen Videocon Awards: Best Anchor for Kaun Banega Crorepati.

== BIG Television Awards ==
Winner

- 2011 – Shaksiyat of the Year for Kaun Banega Crorepati
- 2011 – Distinguished Personality Award

== Other awards ==
Winner

- 1970 – "Saraswati Award" for Anand
- 1989 – Lifetime Achievement Award from the Rotary Club of Bombay (Mumbai).
- 1997 – "Distinguished Alumni " award at the inaugural function of the platinum jubilee celebrations of the Capital's largest Central University.
- 1998 – Lifetime Achievement Award at the Omega Award for Excellence.
- 2000 – All-India Critics Association (AICA): Best Actor Award for Sooryavansham.
- 2000 – Sansui Viewers Choice Awards: Best Supporting Actor for Mohabbatein.
- 2001 – Zee Gold Awards: Critics Award for Best Male for Mohabbatein.
- 2002 – "Icon of the Millennium" award at the 32nd Rupa AIFA Awards at Bandra.
- 2002 – Lifetime Achievement Award by the Sansui Viewers' Choice Movie Awards.
- 2003 – MTV Lycra Awards: Maha Style Icon of the Year (First Recipient)
- 2003 – "Bollywood's Lifetime Achievement Award" by the London-based Asian Guild.
- 2003 – Lifetime Achievement Award at the Sangeet Shiromani Award.
- 2003 – FPFAC 'Achiever' Awards: "Achiever of the Year" award.
- 2004 – "Radio Voice of the Year" award by Radio Mirchi.
- 2004 – Sansui Viewer's Choice Movie Awards: Personality of the Year.
- 2005 – "Diamond of India" award by The International Gemological Institute (IGI).
- 2005 – NDTV Indian of the Year in Entertainment.
- 2006 – Anandalok Awards: Best Actor for Black.
- 2006 – Bollyvista Film Awards: Best Actor for Black.
- 2006 – Rediff Movie Awards: Best Actor for Black.
- 2006 – Lifetime Achievement Award at AXN Action Awards.
- 2007 – Special Award for his contribution to Indian cinema at the 9th Mumbai Academy of the Moving Image International Film.
- 2009 – Lifetime Achievement Award at Gentleman Quarterly magazine's "Men of the Year" Award.
- 2009 – Lifetime Achievement Award for completing 40 years in the entertainment industry at the 11th Mumbai Academy of Moving Images (MAMI).
- 2009 – NDTV Indian of the Year Awards: NDTV icon of 21 years of Entertainment award.
- 2010 – Special Award at the Marathi International Film and Theatre Awards (MIFTA) for his excellent work in films.
- 2010 – Lines Gold Award: Best Actor for Paa.
- 2010 – 'FICCI Frames 2010' Excellence Awards: Best Actor for Paa.
- 2010 – "Taj Enlighten Tareef Award" for his contribution to Indian film industry.
- 2010 – "Timeless Icon" award at the 'Hello! Hall of Fame'.
- 2010 – Lifetime Achievement Award by Asianet Film Awards.
- 2010 – The Asian Awards: Lifetime Achievement Award.
- 2011 – CNN-IBN Indian of the Year in Entertainment.
- 2012 – Lifetime Achievement Award at the Pune International Film Festival (PIFF) for contribution to cinema.
- 2012 – 'FICCI Frames 2012' Excellence Awards: "Award for maximum impact made by a Personality".
- 2012 – Phalke Ratna Award at the Dadasaheb Phalke Academy Awards.
- 2012 – Honoured as the "John Walker & Sons Game Changer of the Century" for his Achievements.
- 2012 – South Indian Education Society (SIES) Sri Chandrashekarendra Saraswati National Eminence award.
- 2012 – Mirchi Music Awards Living Legend With Golden Voice
- 2013 – Honoured by University of Mumbai.
- 2013 – Crowned "India's Prime Icon of 2012".
- 2013 – "Timeless Style Icon".
- 2013 – NASSCOM Global Leadership Awards: "Global Indian Award" for being the ambassador for Indian cinema.
- 2013 – Honoured by the Rotary International.
- 2013 – Maestro Award by the Whistling Woods International Institute.
- 2013 – "Super Achiever of the Year" Award by Society Magazine in Mumbai.
- 2013 – Honoured with "Hridaynath Mangeshkar Award" for his contribution in the film industry.
- 2013 – Honoured at the Rashtrapati Bhavan as one of NDTV's 25 greatest living global Indians.
- 2014 – Honoured with the "Pune Pandit Award" – 2013 by The Art & Music Foundation for honouring & celebrating his accomplishments with 100 years of Indian Cinema
- 2014 – "Global Icon of the Year" award at the NRI of the Year awards.
- 2014 – Honoured with "Box office Shahenshah Award" at the Star Box Office India Awards.
- 2014 – Yash Chopra Memorial Award.
- 2014 – Indian Film Festival of Melbourne: IFFM Excellence in Cinema Award.
- 2015 – 'Social Media Person of the Year' award by the Internet and Mobile Association of India (IAMAI).
- 2015 – Filmfare Glamour & Style Awards: Timeless Glamour and Style Icon (Male).
- 2016 – NDTV Indian of the Year 2015 Awards: Lifetime Achievement.
- 2016 – TOIFA Awards: Best Actor (Critics Choice) Male Piku.
- 2016 – TOIFA Awards: Lifetime Achievement Award.
- 2016 – GQ awards: The GQ Legend Award.
- 2018 – Femina Beauty Awards: Style Legend of All Time.
- 2018 – Sayaji Ratna Award by Baroda Management Association
- 2023 – Living Legend at the India UK Achievers Honours.

== International honours and recognition ==
- In July 1999, Bachchan was named the "Greatest Star of stage or screen of the Millennium" by BBC online poll where he defeated many Hollywood legends such as Alec Guinness, Marlon Brando, Laurence Olivier and Charlie Chaplin.
- In 2001, he was ranked as the "Most Powerful Indian Film Star" by Forbes.
- On 10 September 2001 he was awarded the "Actor of the Century" award at the Alexandria International Film Festival. Egyptian Minister of Culture Farouk Hosni presented Bachchan with the award in recognition of his contribution to international cinema.
- On 14 March 2003, he was conferred with the honorary citizenship of the French town of Deauville at the fifth edition of the Asian film festival. An honour earlier bestowed on only two people, Queen Elizabeth II and the Soviet space hero, Yuri Gagarin.
- In October 2003, he was conferred with the Medal of Honour of Morocco, given to him by King Mohammed at the Marrakech International Film Festival.
- In October 2003, Time magazine dubbed Bachchan as "the Undisputed Godfather of Bollywood". He was also featured in its list of Bollywood's Brightest Stars.
- In April 2005, The Walter Reade Theater of Lincoln Center in New York honored Amitabh Bachchan with a special tribute, retrospective—titled "Amitabh Bachchan: The Biggest Film Star in the World". The tribute also included "An Evening with Amitabh Bachchan", a live appearance by Bachchan hosted at the Lincoln Center's Alice Tully Hall.
- He was honoured along with actors and directors from Hollywood at an International Film Festival in Rabat, Morocco.
- In the weekend of 16 and 17 June June 2007, the British Academy of Film and Television Arts (BAFTA) hosts a Bachchan spectacular retrospective to honour Bachchan's stellar career. The Chairman of BAFTA ended the event by announcing Bachchan as an honorary Life-Time member of BAFTA.
- On 22 November 2007 he was honoured by the London Mayor Ken Livingstone with "The Visit London Special Award for Outstanding Achievement" for his contribution to Indian cinema in the last 30 years.
- On 15 January 2009, Le Salon du Cinema (Cinema Fair) in Paris paid tribute to Indian Cinema for their new edition, with Bachchan being the guest of honour. He also launched a retrospective of his films.
- On 31 January 2009, he was honoured with the World Economic Forum's Crystal Award at Davos for his contribution to the world of art.
- In 2009, the Tehran Film Festival has invited Bachchan to receive the Lifetime Achievement Award.
- In December 2009, he was honoured with a Lifetime Achievement Award at the Dubai International Film Festival for his outstanding contribution to cinema.
- In December 2009, he was honoured with the 8th Asian Film Cultural Award for his contribution to cinema for 40 years.
- In February 2010, he was honoured with a Lifetime Achievement Award at the Sixth Muscat, Oman International Film Festival (Miff).
- In March 2010, he has been named the list of CNN's "top 25 Asian actors of all time".
- In March 2010, he has won the Lifetime Achievement Award at the 34th Hong Kong International Film Festival.
- In October 2010, he was honoured with a Lifetime Achievement Award at The Asian Awards in London.
- In April 2012, he was conferred the Polio Eradication Champion award by Rotary International for his invaluable support to the Polio Eradication Programme in India.
- In July 2012, he was given the due honor to carry the Olympic torch during the last leg of its relay in London's Southwark.
- In November 2012, he was honoured by the Australian Government for his remarkable contribution to the Indian cinema, which is celebrating its centenary year.
- In December 2012, he was honoured with the Tribute to Hindi Cinema Award at the 12th Marrakech International Film Festival.
- On 10 December 2012, he was honoured with the "Keys to the City of Florence" at the River to River. Florence Indian Film Festival in Italy.
- In May 2013, he will be honoured with "La Trobe University Global Citizenship Award" by the La Trobe University in Melbourne. The university is also introducing a Phd Scholarship called Shri Amitabh Bachchan Scholarship.
- In May 2013, he will be honoured with "International Screen Icon" award by the Victorian Government and the "Ambassador of Goodwill" award from the Vice Chancellor of La Trobe University in Melbourne.
- In September 2013, he was honoured with the "Global Diversity Award" in the British Parliament. Speaker of the House of Commons, presented the ornately sculpted glass Award to Bachchan and describing him as "a Bollywood icon and the most famous Indian film star of all time".
- In March 2014, he was honoured with the "Global Icon of the Year" award at the NRI of the Year awards.
- In May 2014, he was honoured with the "International Screen Icon" award during the inaugural awards ceremony at the Indian Film Festival of Melbourne (IFFM).
- In March 2021, he was honoured with the "International Federation of Film Archives (FIAF)" award for his contribution in preserving India's film heritage.

== See also ==
- List of accolades received by Piku
