= Ratan Tata: A Life =

Ratan Tata: A Life is the biography of Ratan Tata by Thomas Mathew.
