= Tata Hall =

University building in Massachusetts, US

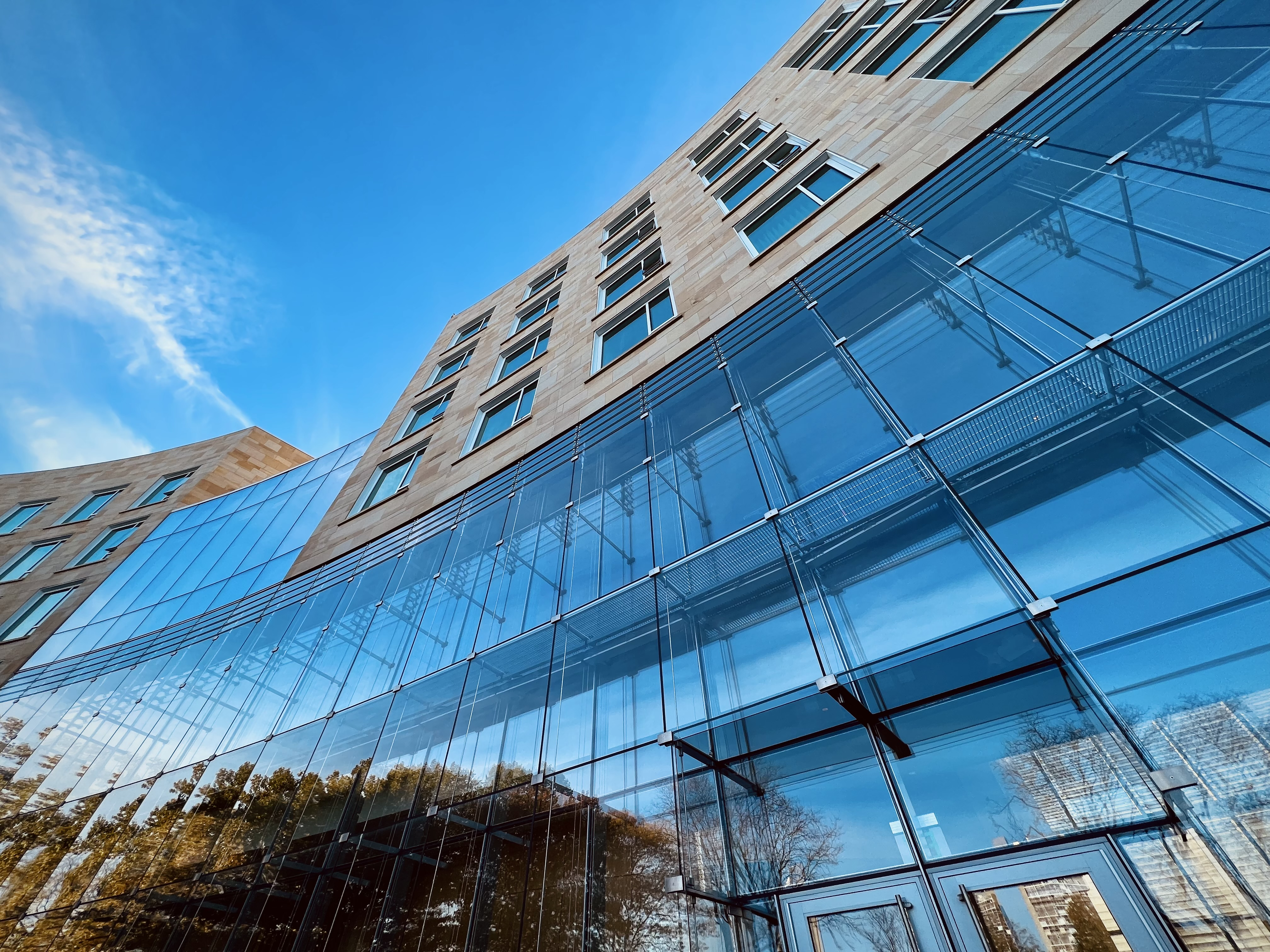
- Tata Hall Exterior, 2022
- Interactive map of the Tata Hall area

General information
- Location: Allston, Massachusetts, United States
- Coordinates: 42.3666°N 71.119°W
- Completed: 2013
- Owner: Harvard Business School

Design and construction
- Structural engineer: LeMessurier Consultants

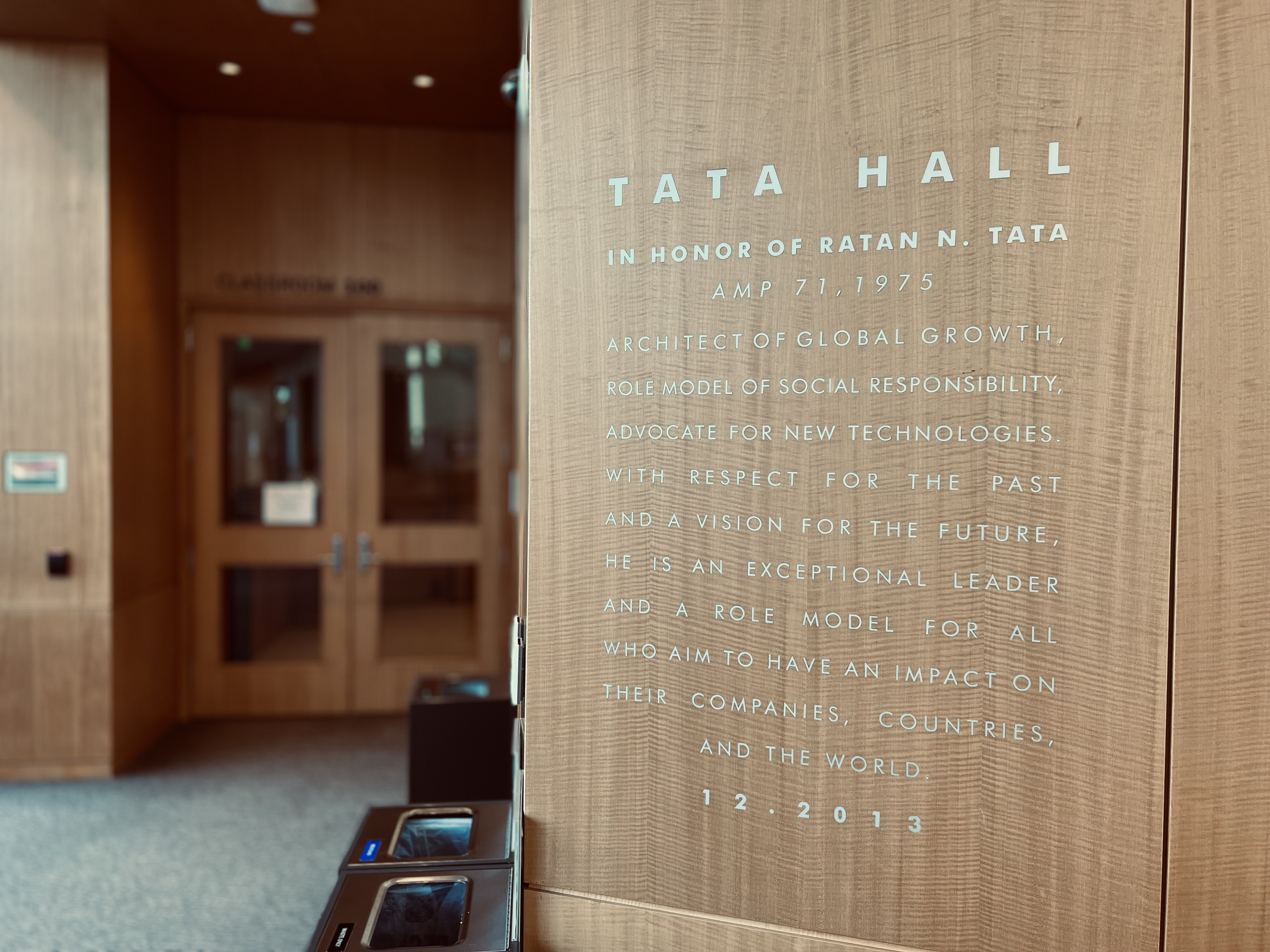
Commemorating message in Tata Hall interior, 2022

Tata Hall is a building on the campus of the Harvard Business School in Allston, Massachusetts. It was built in part with $50 million from the Tata Group, and named in honor of its former chairman and HBS alumnus Ratan Tata. The project began in 2010, and it was completed in 2013. The building includes a dormitory and classrooms.
