= Sayaji Ratna Award =

- Awarded for: iconic character and outstanding contribution in the fields of business, sports, arts, humanity, education, governance & medicine
- Date: 2013
- Location: Vadodara
- Country: India
- Presented by: Baroda Management Association
- Website: BMABaroda.com

Baroda Management Association (BMA) has instituted a national level Sayaji Ratna Award in 2013 to mark the 151st birth anniversary of Maharaja Sayajirao Gaekwad III, the erstwhile ruler of Baroda. BMA is an institution founded in 1957 in Vadodara and is an organization member of All India Management Association. This award is given annually to living legends of India. It recognizes the personality of the iconic character and outstanding contribution in the realms of business, sports, arts, humanity, education, governance and medicine. The jury selects a person whose life had demonstrated stellar qualities that Maharaja Sayajirao III imbibed and exhibited during his illustrious reign. The Significant among of those qualities are – Vision, Integrity, Compassion, Philanthropy, Institution building ability, Patronage of experts and Leadership that touches, inspires and uplifts all sections of the society.

== First recipient ==
The first recipient of the award was N. R. Narayana Murthy, co-founder of Infosys Ltd. The award was conferred at a ceremony on 13 May 2013 in Vadodara.

== Second recipient ==
The second recipient of the Sayaji Ratna Award is Ratan Tata, an Indian businessman of the Tata Group, a Mumbai-based conglomerate. Presently he holds the position of chairman Emeritus of Tata Sons, which is an honorary and advisory position. The award is conferred to him on 1 December 2015 in Vadodara.

== Third recipient ==
The third recipient of the award was Amitabh Bachchan, an actor of Hindi Cinema. It was conferred on him on 20 November 2018 at Vadodara.

== See also ==
- Baroda Management Association (BMA)
- Maharaja Sayajirao Gaekwad III
- Vadodara Mahanagar Seva Sadan
