= Ratan Tata =

Indian Business Executive and philanthropist (1937–2024)

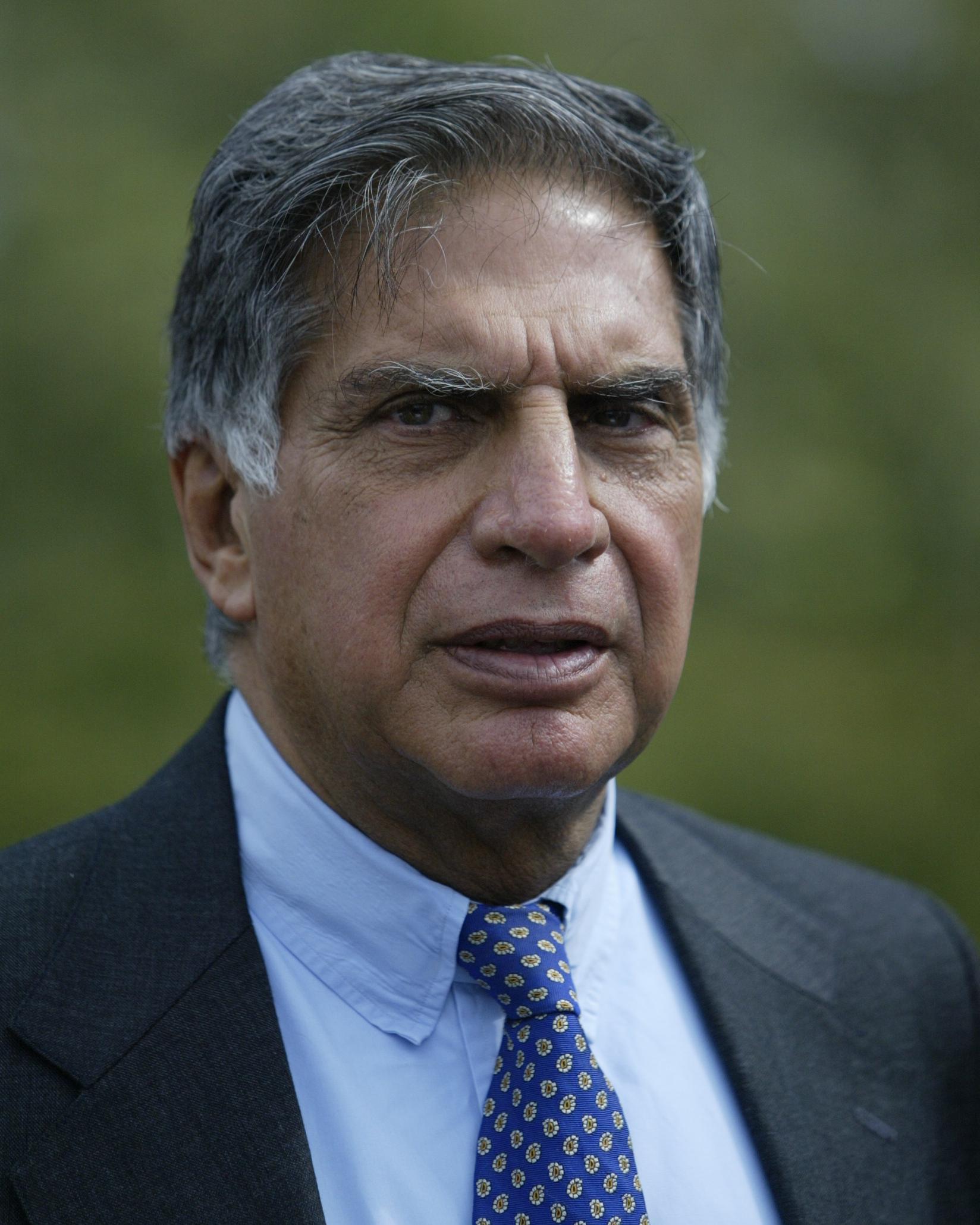
- Tata in 2005

5th Chairman of Tata Sons and Tata Group

Chairman Emeritus
- Interim; 24 October 2016 – 21 February 2017
- Preceded by: Cyrus Mistry
- Succeeded by: Natarajan Chandrasekaran
- In office 25 March 1991 – 28 December 2012
- Preceded by: JRD Tata
- Succeeded by: Cyrus Mistry

Personal details
- Born: Ratan Naval Tata; 28 December 1937 Bombay, Bombay Presidency, British India (now Mumbai, Maharashtra, India)
- Died: 9 October 2024 (aged 86) Mumbai, Maharashtra, India
- Relations: Tata family
- Parents: Naval Tata (father); Sooni Commissariat (mother)
- Education: Cornell University (BArch) Harvard Business School (Advanced Management Program)
- Occupation: Industrialist; philanthropist
- Awards: Order of Australia (2023); Assam Baibhav (2021); Honorary Knight Grand Cross of the Order of the British Empire (2014); Honorary Knight Commander of the Order of the British Empire (2009); Padma Vibhushan (2008); Maharashtra Bhushan (2006); Padma Bhushan (2000)

Ratan Naval Tata (Note: Hindi: [rətən nəʋəl ʈaːʈaː]) (28 December 1937 – 9 October 2024) was an Indian billionaire , industrialist and philanthropist. He served as the chairman of Tata Group and Tata Sons from 1991 to 2012, and he held the position of the interim chairman from October 2016 to February 2017. In 2000, he received the Padma Bhushan, the third-highest civilian honour in India, followed by the Padma Vibhushan, the country's second-highest civilian honour, in 2008.

Ratan Tata was the son of Naval Tata, who was adopted by Ratanji Tata, son of Jamsetji Tata. He attended the Harvard Business School Advanced Management Program in 1975. He joined the Tata Group in 1962, starting on the shop floor of Tata Steel. He later succeeded JRD Tata as chairman of Tata Sons upon the latter's retirement in 1991. During his tenure, the Tata Group acquired Tetley, Jaguar Land Rover, and Corus, in an attempt to turn Tata from a largely India-centric group into a global business.

Throughout his life, Tata invested in over 40 start-ups, primarily in a personal capacity, with additional investments through his firm, RNT Capital Advisors.

== Early life and education ==
Ratan Naval Tata was born in Mumbai, (earlier Bombay), during the British Raj, into a Parsi family, on 28 December 1937. He was the son of Naval Tata (who was born in Surat and later adopted into the Tata family) and Soonoo Tata (the niece of Tata group founder Jamsetji Tata). Tata's biological grandfather, Hormusji Tata, was a member of the Tata family by blood. In 1948, when Tata was 10, his parents separated, and he was subsequently raised and adopted by Navajbai Tata, his grandmother and the widow of Ratanji Tata. He had a younger brother, Jimmy Tata, and a half-brother, Noel Tata, from Naval Tata's second marriage to his stepmother Simone Tata, and two half-sisters, Shireen and Deanna Jeejebhoy, from his mother's second marriage.

Tata studied at the Campion School, Mumbai, until 8th grade. He then continued his studies at the Cathedral and John Connon School in Mumbai and the Riverdale Country School in New York City, from which he graduated in 1955. After high school, Tata enrolled in Cornell University, from which he graduated with a bachelor's degree in architecture in 1962. While at Cornell, Tata became a member of the Alpha Sigma Phi fraternity. In 1975, Tata enrolled in the Advanced Management Program at Harvard Business School. In 2008, Tata gifted Cornell $50 million, becoming the largest international donor in the university's history. Tata also donated $50 million to Harvard University, to establish an executive center, which is now called Tata Hall, that supports over 9,000 executive education students each year.

== Career ==
=== Early years ===
After graduating from Cornell, Tata worked at the architectural firm Jones & Emmons in Los Angeles, until his return to India in late 1962.

=== Later years ===
In the 1970s, Ratan Tata was given a managerial position in the Tata group. He achieved initial success by turning the subsidiary National Radio and Electronics (NELCO) around, only to see it collapse during an economic slowdown. In 1991, JRD Tata stepped down as chairman of Tata Sons, naming his successor. Initially, Tata faced stiff resistance from the heads of various subsidiaries, who had a large amount of operational freedom under the senior Tata's tenure. In response, Tata implemented a number of policies designed to consolidate power, including the implementation of a retirement age, having subsidiaries report directly to the group office, and requiring subsidiaries to contribute their profit to building the Tata group brand. Tata prioritized innovation and delegated many responsibilities to younger talent. Under his leadership, overlapping operations between subsidiaries were streamlined into company-wide operations, with the group exiting unrelated businesses to take on globalization.

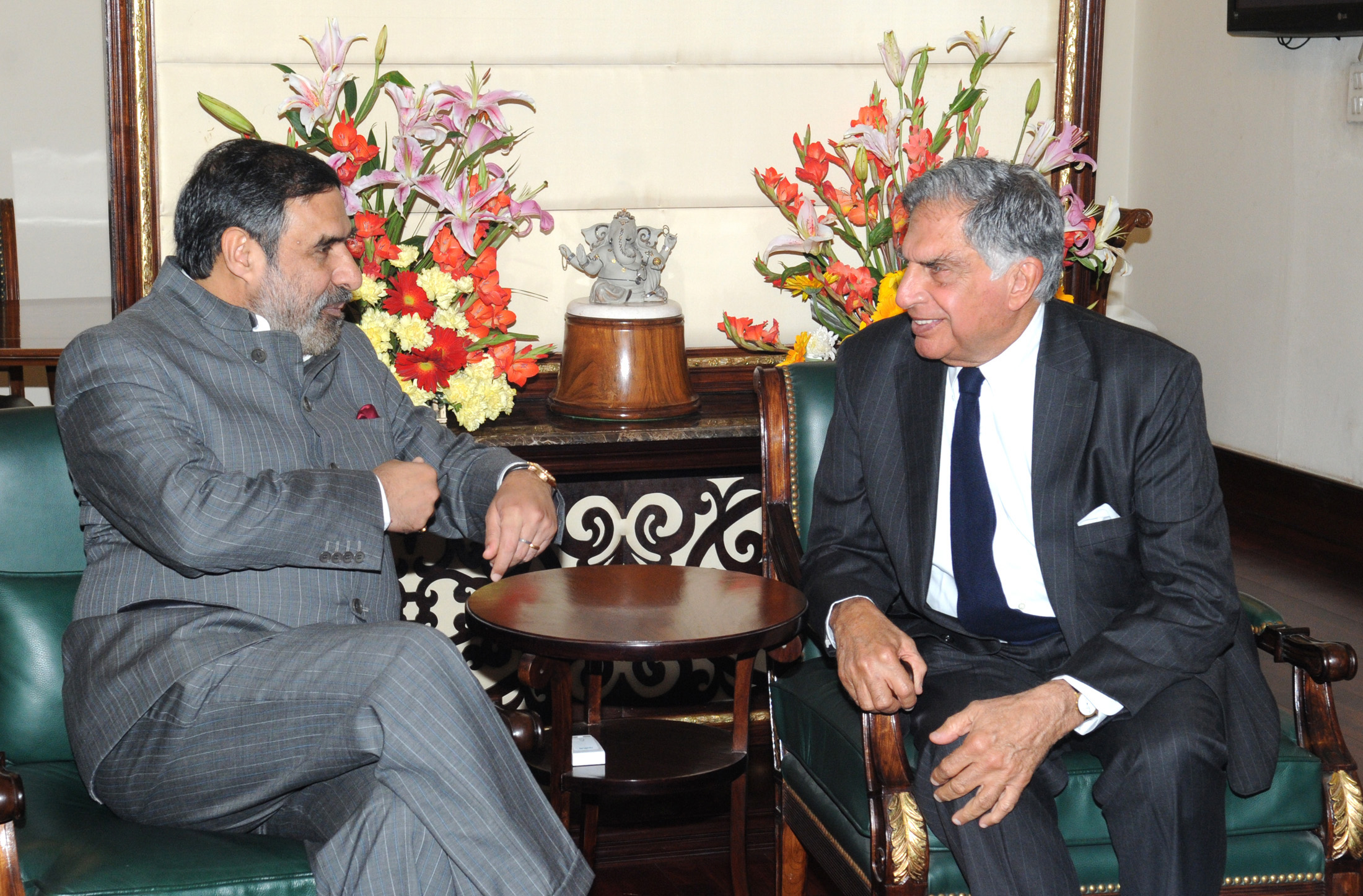
Ratan meets union minister Anand Sharma in 2011

During the 21 years Tata led the Tata Group, revenue grew over 40 times, and profit over 50 times. When he took over the company, sales overwhelmingly comprised commodity sales, but at the end of his tenure, the majority of sales came from brands. He had Tata Tea acquire Tetley, Tata Motors acquire Jaguar Land Rover, and Tata Steel acquire Corus. These acquisitions repositioned Tata from a largely India-centric group into a global business, with over 65% of revenues coming from operations and sales internationally.

He also conceptualized and spearheaded the development of the Tata Nano car after the grand success of the Diesel Tata Indica, which helped put cars at a price-point within reach of the average Indian consumer. Tata Motors has since rolled out the first batch of Tigor Electric Vehicles from its Sanand Plant in Gujarat, which Tata has described as "fast-forward India's electric dream."

Upon turning 75, Ratan Tata resigned his executive powers in the Tata group on 28 December 2012. An ensuing leadership crisis over his succession drew intense media scrutiny. The board of directors of the company appointed his successor, Cyrus Mistry, a relative of Tata and the son of Pallonji Mistry of the Shapoorji Pallonji Group, which was the largest individual shareholder of the Tata group. On 24 October 2016, Cyrus Mistry was removed as chairman of Tata Sons, and Ratan Tata was made interim chairman. A selection committee, which included Tata as a member, was formed to find a successor. On 12 January 2017, Natarajan Chandrasekaran was named as the chairman of Tata Sons, a role he assumed in February 2017. In February 2017, Mistry was removed as a director for Tata Sons. The National Company Law Appellate Tribunal later found in December 2019 that the removal of Cyrus Mistry as the chairman of Tata Sons was illegal, and ordered that he be reinstated. On appeal, India's Supreme Court upheld the dismissal of Cyrus Mistry.

Tata had also invested in multiple companies. He had invested in Snapdeal, – one of India's leading e-commerce websites at that time. In January 2016, he invested in Teabox, an online premium Indian Tea seller, and CashKaro.com, a discount coupons and cash-back website. He had made small investments in both early and late-stage companies in India, such as INR 0.95 Cr in Ola Cabs. In April 2015, it was reported that Tata had acquired a stake in the Chinese smartphone startup Xiaomi. In 2016, he invested in Nestaway, an online real-estate portal that later acquired Zenify to start the online real-estate and pet-care portal, Dogspot. Tata also launched a companionship startup for senior citizens named Goodfellows to encourage intergenerational friendships.

== Philanthropic contributions and endowments ==
Tata was a supporter of education, medicine and rural development, and considered a leading philanthropist in India. Ratan Tata was the highest international donor to the Cornell University.

=== 1984 Anti-Sikh Pogrom victims ===
In the aftermath of the 1984 Anti-Sikh Riots, Ratan Tata extended his support to affected Sikh survivors by donating trucks through Tata Motors. This enabled Sikh truck drivers who had lost their vehicles during the violence to regain their livelihoods. His charitable donation enabled many Sikh victims to rebuild their lives and businesses. Following this act, Sikh drivers in Punjab and other parts of India continue to remain loyal customers of Tata trucks.

=== University of New South Wales ===
Tata supported University of New South Wales Faculty of Engineering to develop capacitive deionisation to provide improved water for challenged areas.

=== University of California ===
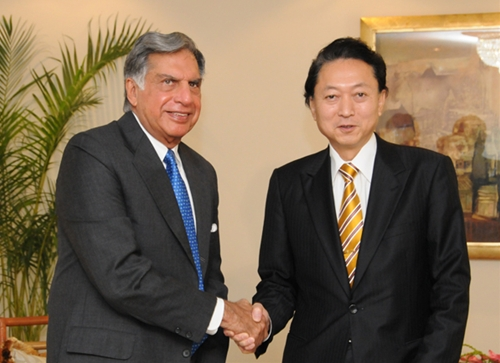
Ratan with a Japanese delegate

Tata Hall at the University of California, San Diego (UC San Diego) is a state-of-the-art research facility that was opened in November 2018. The building is named after the Tata Trusts, which donated $70 million to UC San Diego in 2016 to establish the Tata Institute for Genetics and Society (TIGS), which is housed within the building. The Tata Institute for Genetics and Society at UC San Diego is a joint initiative between the Tata Trusts and UC San Diego. It aims to address some of the world's most pressing problems, such as the spread of infectious diseases and the need for sustainable food sources. The research conducted at the institute focuses on a range of topics, including gene editing, stem cell therapy, and disease control. Tata Hall at the UC San Diego is a 7-story building that is spread over 128,000 square feet and houses research facilities for the biological and physical sciences. The building has laboratories, offices, and meeting spaces that are designed to foster collaboration and innovation among researchers. It is a LEED-certified building; designed to be environmentally sustainable and energy-efficient.

=== Tata Education and Development Trust ===
Tata Education and Development Trust, a philanthropic affiliate of Tata Group, endowed a $28 million Tata Scholarship Fund that will allow Cornell University to provide financial aid to undergraduate students from India. The scholarship fund will support approximately 20 scholars at any given time and will ensure that the very best Indian students have access to Cornell, regardless of their financial circumstances. The scholarship will be awarded annually; recipients will receive it for the duration of their undergraduate study at Cornell.

=== Executive center at Harvard Business School ===
In 2010 Tata Group companies and Tata charities donated $50 million for the construction of an executive center at Harvard Business School (HBS). The executive center has been named Tata Hall, after Ratan Tata. The total construction costs have been estimated at $100 million. Tata Hall is located in the northeast corner of the HBS campus, and is devoted to the Harvard Business School's mid-career executive education program. It is seven stories tall, and about 155,000 gross square feet. It houses approximately 180 bedrooms, in addition to academic and multi-purpose spaces.

=== Tata Innovation Center at Cornell Tech ===
The Tata Innovation Center at Cornell Tech is named after Ratan Tata, and mixes academics and industry in a building on the Roosevelt Island campus. The seven-floor structure is meant primarily as a business incubator for students, faculty, and staff, with 70% of the building being commercially leased and 30% devoted to academic space. Tata Consultancy Services (TCS) is a tenant in the space.

=== Indian Institute of Technology ===
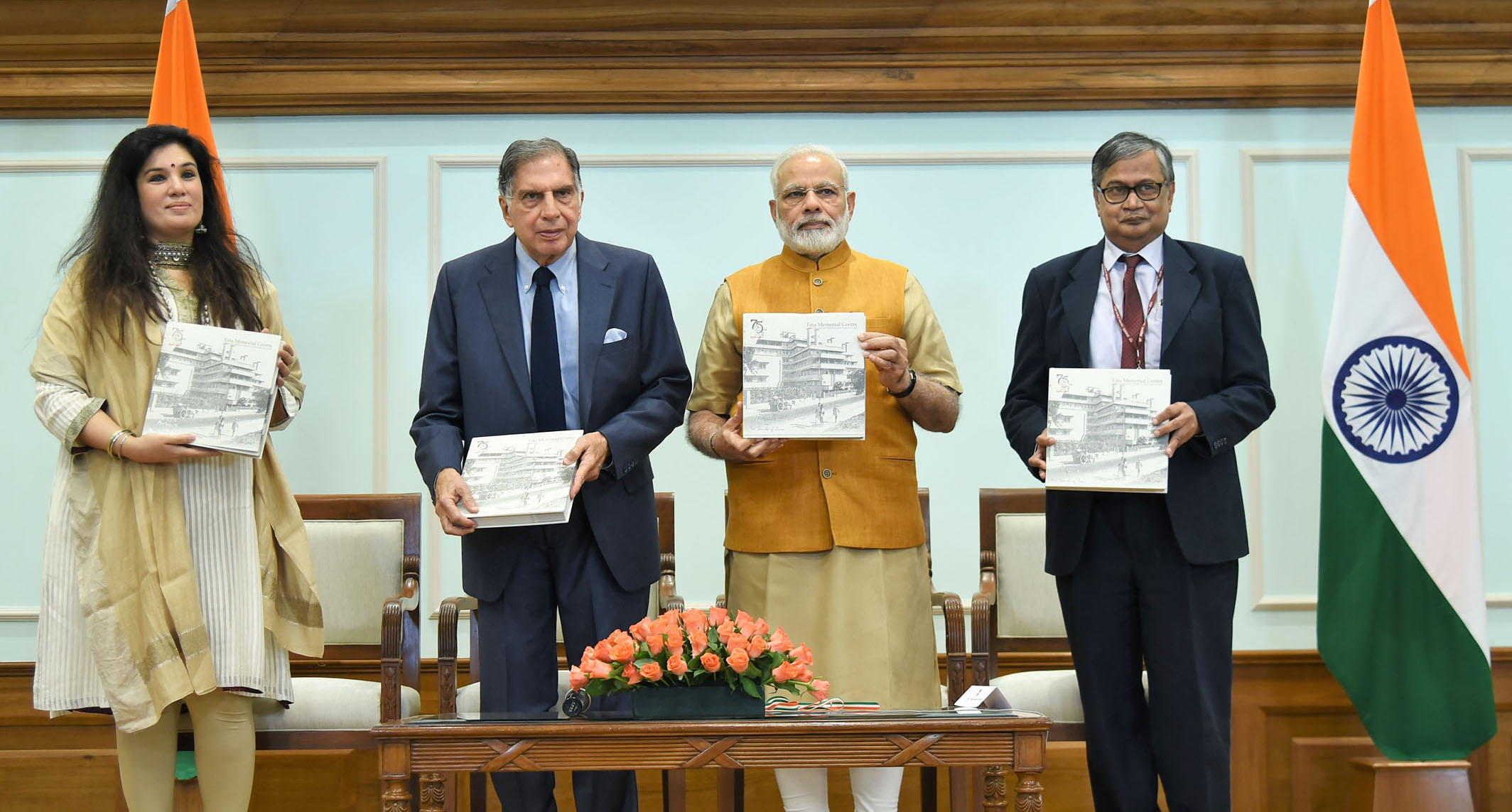
Ratan with Indian prime minister Narendra Modi at the Platinum Jubilee Milestone book launch

In 2014, Tata Group endowed the Indian Institute of Technology, Bombay with ₹950 million (equivalent to ₹980 million or US$10 million in 2026) and formed the Tata Centre for Technology and Design (TCTD) to develop design and engineering principles suited to the needs of people and communities with limited resources.

=== Indian Centre for Neuroscience ===
Tata Trusts under the chairmanship of Ratan Tata provided a grant of ₹750 million (equivalent to ₹770 million or US$8.3 million in 2026) to the Centre for Neuroscience, Indian Institute of Science to study mechanisms underlying the cause of Alzheimer's disease and to evolve methods for its early diagnosis and treatment. This grant was to be spread over 5 years starting in 2014.

=== MIT Tata Center of Technology and Design ===
Tata Group, under the leadership of Ratan Tata formed the MIT Tata Center of Technology and Design at the Massachusetts Institute of Technology (MIT) with a mission to address the challenges of resource-constrained communities, with an initial focus on India.

=== Cornell University ===
Ratan Tata was the highest international donor to Cornell University. Cornell University paid tribute to its alumnus Ratan Tata, honoring his leadership, philanthropy, and contributions to education and research, particularly through the Tata-Cornell Institute for Agriculture and Nutrition.

=== Contributions to Taj Hotel Staff victims ===
Following the attack on the Taj Mahal Palace Hotel in November 2008 by the terrorists of Lashkar-e-Taiba, Tata decided to restore the heritage of the hotel as well as financially support the families of people who lost their lives in the attack, even personally visiting the homes of victims to ensure their well-being. During the carnage, Tata also chose to wait outside the Taj Hotel for three days until the operation concluded.

=== Animal welfare ===
In June 2024, Tata personally appealed on Instagram for volunteers to donate blood for a critically ill stray dog at his Mumbai animal hospital, prompting numerous offers and underlining his personal commitment to animal welfare.

== Board memberships and affiliations ==
Ratan Tata was the interim chairman of Tata Sons. He headed the main two Tata trusts, Sir Dorabji Tata and Allied Trusts and Sir Ratan Tata Trust and their allied trusts, with a combined stake of 66% in Tata Sons, the Tata group's holding company.

He served in various capacities in organizations in India and abroad. He was a member of Prime Minister's 'Council on Trade and Industry' and the 'National Manufacturing Competitiveness Council.' He was on the jury panel of Pritzker Architecture Prize – considered to be one of the world's premier architecture prizes.

Over the years, Tata had served on the Cornell University Board of Trustees, personally advising the school's administration in matters of international involvement, particularly regarding projects connected to India. More broadly, Tata had served on the board's Academic Affairs, Student Life, and Development Committees. In 2013 he was named Cornell Entrepreneur of the Year.

He was a director on the boards of Alcoa Inc., Mondelez International and the Board of Governors of the East–West Center. He was also a member of the board of trustees of University of Southern California, Harvard Business School Board of Dean's Advisors, X Prize and Cornell University. He was a member on the board of International Advisory Council at Bocconi University.

He was on the advisory board of Hakluyt & Co, an international consultancy company.

In 2013, he was appointed to the board of trustees of the Carnegie Endowment for International Peace.

In February 2015, Ratan took an advisory role at Kalari Capital, a venture capital firm founded by Vani Kola.

In October 2016, Tata Sons removed Cyrus Mistry as its chairman, nearly 4 years after he took over the reins of the over $100 billion conglomerate, Ratan Tata made a comeback, taking over the company's interim boss for 4 months. On 12 January 2017, Natarajan Chandrasekaran was named as the chairman of Tata Sons, a role he assumed in February 2017.

== Personal life and death ==
Tata never married and had no children. In 2011, he stated, "I came close to getting married four times and each time I backed off in fear or for one reason or another."

Tata was admitted to Breach Candy Hospital in critical condition and was under intensive care. He died there at 23:30 IST on 9 October 2024, at the age of 86 due to age-related issues. Following his death, the Government of Maharashtra and the Government of Jharkhand announced a day of mourning.

On 10 October, Tata was given a state funeral. His last rites were conducted at the Parsi crematorium at Worli. He was accorded with military and 21-gun salute during his final rites. The Mumbai Police delivered a ceremonial guard of honour and his body was wrapped in the Indian flag. Upon his death, Tata donated ₹10,000 crore (equivalent to ₹100 billion or US$1.1 billion in 2026) through his will which included his mentee Shantanu Naidu.

== Ratan Tata's will ==
Ratan Tata's will, made public after his death, outlines the distribution of his ₹10,000 crore (equivalent to ₹100 billion or US$1.1 billion in 2026) estate among family, friends, staff, and charitable organisations.

Key aspects of the will:

- Ratan Tata Endowment Foundation (RTEF): A significant portion of Tata's wealth around ₹3,800 crore (equivalent to ₹39 billion or US$420 million in 2026) worth of shares, including in Tata Group companies like Tata Motors and Tata Sons, will be transferred to the RTEF, a charitable trust established in 2022 and the Ratan Tata Endowment Trust for philanthropic purposes.
- Family: The will designates assets to Tata's family members, including his brother Jimmy Tata and half-sisters Shireen and Deanna Jejeebhoy. His half sisters are also the will's executors.
- Mohini Mohan Dutta: Mohini Mohan Dutta, a Jamshedpur-based entrepreneur and former Tata Group employee, is entitled to one-third of the residual estate, including bank deposits exceeding ₹350 crore (equivalent to ₹361 crore or US$39 million in 2026) and proceeds from selling personal items.
- Shantanu Naidu: Tata's mentee and executive assistant, Shantanu Naidu, is named in the will. Tata also relinquished his stake in Naidu's companionship venture, Goodfellows, and waived his education loan of ₹1 crore (equivalent to ₹1.0 crore or US$110,000 in 2026) extended for his MBA studies at Cornell University.
- Staff: Provisions are included for long-serving household staff. Tata bequeathed nearly ₹3.5 crore (equivalent to ₹3.6 crore or US$390,000 in 2026) to his household staff and office employees. He waived personal loans given to his staff and even a neighbour. Additionally, ₹1 lakh (equivalent to ₹1.0 lakh or US$1,100 in 2026) was allocated to part-time helpers and car cleaners. Several staff members received individual bequests, including: Rajan Shaw (Cook) – just over ₹1 crore (equivalent to ₹1.0 crore or US$110,000 in 2026), including a loan waiver of ₹51 lakh (equivalent to ₹53 lakh or US$56,000 in 2026), Subbaiah Konar (Butler) – ₹66 lakh (equivalent to ₹68 lakh or US$73,000 in 2026), including a loan waiver of ₹36 lakh (equivalent to ₹37 lakh or US$40,000 in 2026), Delnaz Gilder (Secretary) – ₹10 lakh (equivalent to ₹10 lakh or US$11,000 in 2026), Raju Leon (Driver) – ₹1.5 lakh (equivalent to ₹1.5 lakh or US$1,700 in 2026) along with a ₹18 lakh (equivalent to ₹19 lakh or US$20,000 in 2026) loan waiver, Hoshi D Malesara (Tata Trusts Consultant) – ₹5 lakh (equivalent to ₹5.2 lakh or US$5,500 in 2026), Devendar Katamollu (Alibaug Bungalow Caretaker) – ₹2 lakh (equivalent to ₹2.1 lakh or US$2,200 in 2026), Deepti Divakaran (Personal Assistant) – ₹1.5 lakh (equivalent to ₹1.5 lakh or US$1,700 in 2026), Gopal Singh (Peon) – ₹50,000 (equivalent to ₹52,000 or US$550 in 2026), Pandurang Gurav (Peon) – ₹50,000 (equivalent to ₹52,000 or US$550 in 2026), Sarfaraz Deshmukh (Helper) – ₹2 lakh (equivalent to ₹2.1 lakh or US$2,200 in 2026) loan waiver.
- Pets: Tata's will ensures that his German Shepherd - Tito, will be cared for and his will allocated ₹12 lakh (equivalent to ₹12 lakh or US$13,000 in 2026) for the dog's care.
- Assets: Tata's estate comprises assets including a 2,000-square-foot beach bungalow in Alibaug, a two-story residence in Mumbai, and fixed deposits exceeding ₹350 crore (equivalent to ₹361 crore or US$39 million in 2026).
- Luxury cars: Tata's collection of 20 to 30 luxury vehicles may be acquired by the Tata Group for display in a museum or for auctioning.
- Clothes: Tata also instructed that all his clothing be donated to NGOs for distribution to the underprivileged. Known for his refined taste in fashion, Tata's wardrobe included brands like Daks, Polo, Brooks Brothers, Brioni suits, and Hermes ties.
- Overseas: His Seychelles land worth ₹85 lakh (equivalent to ₹88 lakh or US$94,000 in 2026) was bequeathed to RNT Associates, a Singapore-registered fund, whose shareholders include former Tata Trusts managing trustee R Venkatraman and former Tata Technologies CEO Patrick McGoldrick.

== Honours and awards ==
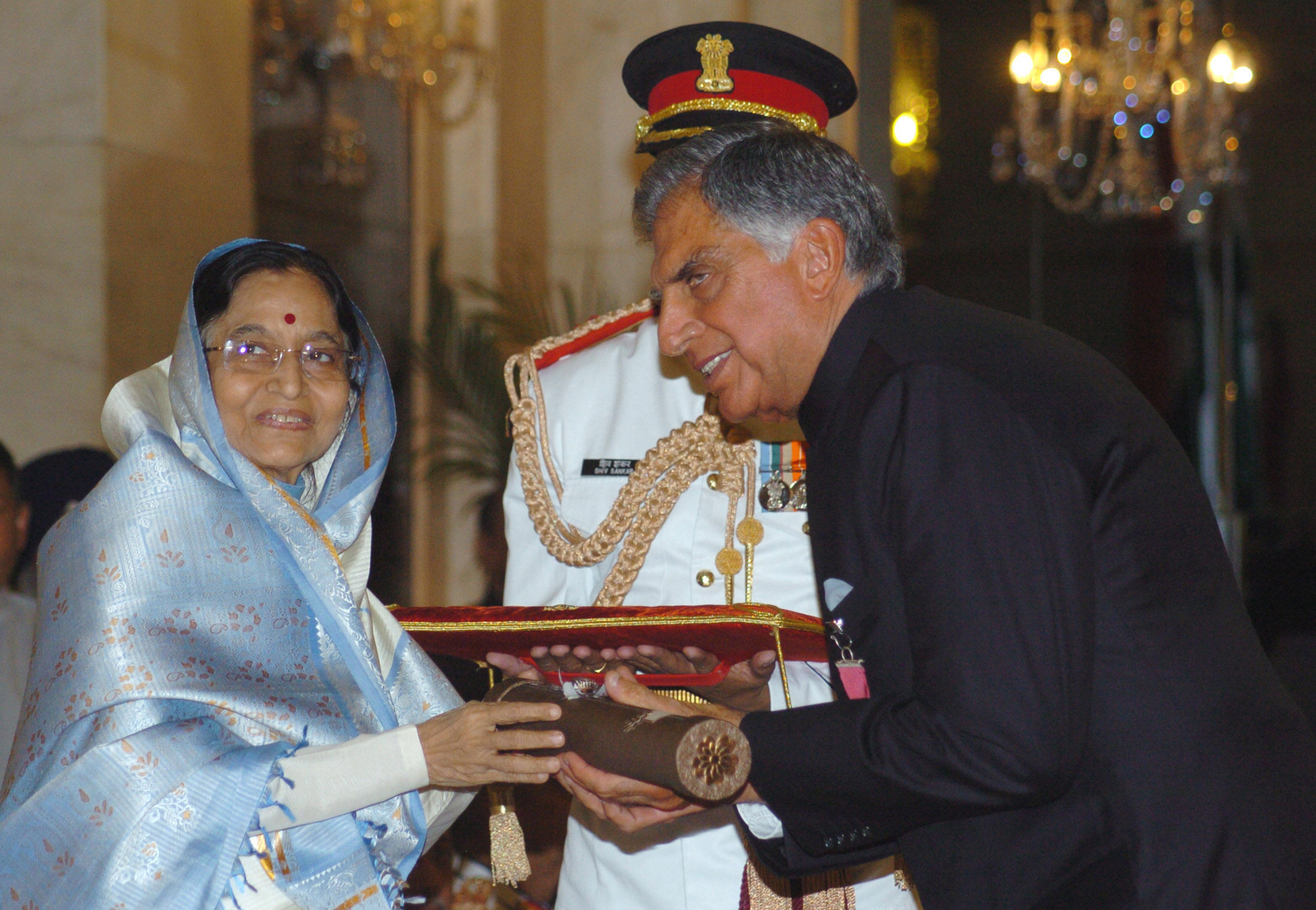
President Pratibha Patil presenting the Padma Vibhushan to Ratan Tata, at the Rashtrapati Bhavan, in 2008

Ratan Tata received the Padma Bhushan in 2000 and Padma Vibhushan in 2008, the third and second highest civilian honours awarded by the Government of India. Tata also received various state civilian honours such as 'Maharashtra Bhushan' in 2006 for his work in the public administration in Maharashtra and 'Assam Baibhav' in 2021 for his contribution towards furthering cancer care in Assam.

He was made a Honorary Citizen of Singapore in 2008. In 2009, he was made a Honorary Knight Commander of the Order of the British Empire (KBE) and advanced to Honorary Knight Grand Cross of the Order of the British Empire (GBE) in 2014. He was made a Grand Officer of the Order of Merit of the Italian Republic in 2009, Italy's most senior order of merit, and in 2012 was awarded the Grand Cordon of the Order of the Rising Sun by Japan. He was made Commander of the Legion of Honour in 2016 and an Honorary Officer of the Order of Australia (AO) in 2023.

On 29 December 2025, Air India Express, a subsidiary of Air India, which is owned by Tata Group, received its first Boeing 737 MAX 8. The aircraft was assigned the registration VT-RNT in the honor of Ratan Tata.

Other awards include:

Year	Name	Awarding organisation	Ref.
2001	Honorary Doctor of Business Administration	Ohio State University	
2004	Medal of the Oriental Republic of Uruguay	Government of Uruguay	
2004	Honorary Doctor of Technology	Asian Institute of Technology.	
2005	International Distinguished Achievement Award	B'nai B'rith International	
2005	Honorary Doctor of Science	University of Warwick.	
2006	Honorary Doctor of Science	Indian Institute of Technology Madras	
2006	Responsible Capitalism Award	For Inspiration and Recognition of Science and Technology (FIRST)	
2007	Honorary Fellowship	The London School of Economics and Political Science	
2007	Carnegie Medal of Philanthropy	Carnegie Endowment for International Peace	
2008	Honorary Doctor of Law	University of Cambridge	
2008	Honorary Doctor of Science	Indian Institute of Technology Bombay	
2008	Honorary Doctor of Science	Indian Institute of Technology Kharagpur	
2008	Honorary Citizen Award	Government of Singapore	
2008	Honorary Fellowship	The Institution of Engineering and Technology	
2008	Inspired Leadership Award	The Performance Theatre	
2009	Honorary Knight Commander of the Order of the British Empire (KBE)	Queen Elizabeth II	
2009	Life Time Contribution Award in Engineering for 2008	Indian National Academy of Engineering	
2009	Grand Officer of the Order of Merit of the Italian Republic	Government of Italy	
2010	Honorary Doctor of Law	University of Cambridge	
2010	Hadrian Award	World Monuments Fund	
2010	Oslo Business for Peace award	Business for Peace Foundation	
2010	Legend in Leadership Award	Yale University	
2010	Honorary Doctor of Laws	Pepperdine University	
2010	CIF Global Indian Award	Canada India Foundation	
2010	Business for Peace Award	Business for Peace Foundation	
2010	Business Leader of the Year	The Asian Awards.	
2012	Honorary Fellow	The Royal Academy of Engineering	
2012	Doctor of Business honoris causa	University of New South Wales	
2012	Grand Cordon of the Order of the Rising Sun	Government of Japan	
2012	Lifetime Achievement Award	Rockefeller Foundation	
2013	International Member	U.S. National Academy of Engineering	
2013	Transformational Leader of the Decade	Indian Affairs India Leadership Conclave 2013	
2013	Ernst and Young Entrepreneur of the Year – Lifetime Achievement	Ernst & Young	
2013	Honorary Doctor of Business Practice	Carnegie Mellon University	
2014	Honorary Doctor of Business	Singapore Management University	
2014	Sayaji Ratna Award	Baroda Management Association	
2014	Honorary Knight Grand Cross of the Order of the British Empire (GBE)	Queen Elizabeth II	
2014	Honorary Doctor of Laws	York University, Canada	
2015	Honorary Doctor of Automotive Engineering	Clemson University	
2015	Sayaji Ratna Award	Baroda Management Association, Honoris Causa, HEC Paris	
2016	Commander of the Legion of Honour	Government of France	
2018	Honorary Doctor in Engineering	Swansea University	
2022	Honorary Doctor of Literature	HSNC University	
2023	Honorary Officer of the Order of Australia (AO)	King Charles III	
2023	Maharashtra Udyog Ratna	Government of Maharashtra	

== In popular culture ==
Mega Icons (2018–2020), an Indian documentary television series on National Geographic about prominent Indian personalities, dedicated an episode to Ratan Tata's contributions.

In 2021, one of Tata's executive assistants, Shantanu Naidu, wrote a memoir that covered his time with the industrialist. The book, I Came Upon a Lighthouse: A Short Memoir of Life with Ratan Tata was published through HarperCollins India.

== See also ==
- Jamsetji Tata
- List of entities associated with Tata Group
- List of philanthropists

== Bibliography ==
- Naidu, Shantanu (2021). I Came Upon a Lighthouse: A Short Memoir of Life with Ratan Tata. Sanjana Desai. HarperCollins India. ISBN 978-93-90327-52-2.

Business positions
Preceded by JRD Tata	Chairman of Tata Group; 1991–2012	Succeeded by Cyrus Mistry
Preceded by Cyrus Mistry	Chairman of Tata Group; 2016–2017	Succeeded by Natarajan Chandrasekaran
