= Baroda Management Association =

- Founded: 1957; 69 years ago
- Headquarters: Vadodara, India

Baroda Management Association (BMA) is an autonomous, professional, non-political and non-profit body based at Vadodara, Gujarat, India. It is affiliated to All India Management Association, Delhi and registered under the Bombay Public Trust Act, 1950. It was founded by leading managers and industrialists on 29 May 1957. In 2012–13, it crossed Rs 1 Crore as revenue. BMA has instituted a national level Sayaji Ratna Award in 2013 to mark the 151st birth anniversary of Maharaja Sayajirao Gaekwad III. The recipients are N R Narayana Murthy, Ratan Tata and Amitabh Bachchan.

== Objective and activities ==
Its main objective is to promote exchange to knowledge and experience of sound management principles and practices. It caters to the management development needs by organising various innovative short and long-term Management Development Programmes, Seminars, Career Development Courses, Publications, Programmes tailored to meet the specific needs of individual organisations and by providing special services to the small-scale industries.

== Management Week ==
Every year, BMA celebrate the Management Week in the last week of May. During Management Week, it conducts Management Talk, Management Quiz, Paper presentation competition (annual awards for Outstanding Young Managers, since 1991) and Foundation Day.

== Annual Management Convention ==
Annual Management Conventions (AMC) are held at Vadodara regularly every year, since 1988.

== See also ==
- Sayaji Ratna Award
