= Stardust Lifetime Achievement Award =

Film award in India

Here is a list of the award winners and the films for which they won.

Year	Winner
2003	Amitabh Bachchan & Shatrughan Sinha
2004
2005
2006
2007	Mithun Chakraborty
2009	Dev Anand
