= List of accolades received by Piku =

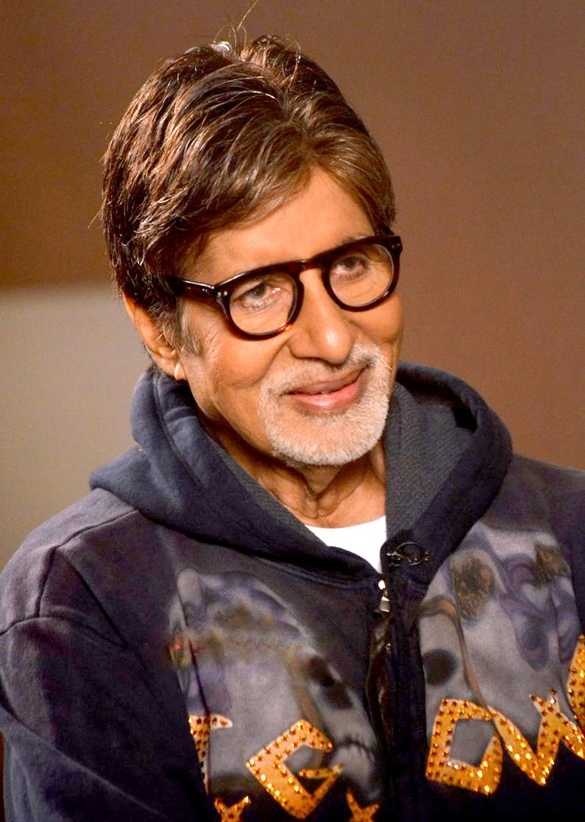
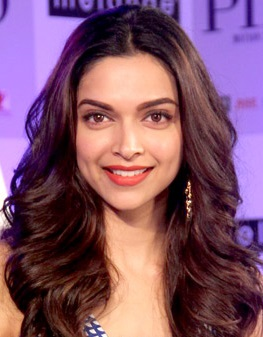
Amitabh Bachchan and Deepika Padukone received widespread critical acclaim for their performances

Piku is a 2015 Indian comedy-drama film directed by Shoojit Sircar and produced by N.P. Singh, Ronnie Lahiri and Sneha Rajani. The film stars Deepika Padukone as the eponymous protagonist, alongside Amitabh Bachchan and Irrfan Khan. Moushumi Chatterjee and Jisshu Sengupta play supporting roles. It was written by Juhi Chaturvedi and the musical score was composed by Anupam Roy. Piku tells the story of a headstrong Bengali architect, who along with her hypochondriac father and a helpful businessman embark on a road trip from New Delhi to Kolkata.

Made on an estimated budget of ₹420 million (US$4.8 million), Piku was released on 8 May 2015, and grossed approximately ₹1.41 billion (US$16 million) worldwide. The film garnered awards and nominations in several categories, with particular praise for its writing, music, and the performances of Padukone and Bachchan. As of June 2016, the film has won a minimum of 35 awards.

At the 63rd National Film Awards, Piku won Best Actor (Bachchan), Best Original Screenplay and Best Dialogues. At the 61st Filmfare Awards ceremony, Piku won five awards, including Best Film – Critics, Best Actress (Padukone), and Best Actor – Critics (Bachchan). The film also garnered nominations for Best Film and Best Director at the ceremony. In addition, Piku won four awards, including Best Actor and Best Actress for Bachchan and Padukone, respectively, at the 22nd Screen Awards ceremony. Among other wins, the film received three Indian Film Festival of Melbourne Awards, three International Indian Film Academy Awards, two Stardust Awards, and five awards each from the BIG Star Entertainment and Zee Cine award ceremonies.

== Accolades ==
Award	Date of ceremony (Note: Date is linked to the article about the awards held that year, wherever possible.)	Category	Recipients	Result	Ref.
BIG Star Entertainment Awards	13 December 2015	Most Entertaining Drama Film	Piku	Won	
BIG Star Entertainment Awards	13 December 2015	Most Entertaining Actor in a Drama Role – Male	Irrfan Khan	Nominated	
BIG Star Entertainment Awards	13 December 2015	Most Entertaining Actor in a Drama Role – Male	Amitabh Bachchan	Won	
BIG Star Entertainment Awards	13 December 2015	Most Entertaining Actor of the Year – Male	Amitabh Bachchan	Won	
BIG Star Entertainment Awards	13 December 2015	Most Entertaining Actor of the Year – Female	Deepika Padukone	Won	
BIG Star Entertainment Awards	13 December 2015	Most Entertaining Actor in a Drama Role – Female	Deepika Padukone	Won	
Filmfare Awards	15 January 2016	Best Film	Piku	Nominated	
Filmfare Awards	15 January 2016	Best Film (Critics)	Piku	Won	
Filmfare Awards	15 January 2016	Best Director	Shoojit Sircar	Nominated	
Filmfare Awards	15 January 2016	Best Actor	Amitabh Bachchan	Nominated	
Filmfare Awards	15 January 2016	Best Actor (Critics)	Amitabh Bachchan	Won	
Filmfare Awards	15 January 2016	Best Actress	Deepika Padukone	Won	
Filmfare Awards	15 January 2016	Best Screenplay	Juhi Chaturvedi	Won	
Filmfare Awards	15 January 2016	Best Music Director	Anupam Roy	Nominated	
Filmfare Awards	15 January 2016	Best Background Score	Anupam Roy	Won	
Global Indian Music Academy Awards	6 April 2016	Best Music Debut	Anupam Roy	Nominated	
Global Indian Music Academy Awards	6 April 2016	Best Background Score	Anupam Roy	Nominated	
Indian Film Festival of Melbourne	16–27 August 2015	Best Film	Piku	Won	
Indian Film Festival of Melbourne	16–27 August 2015	Best Director	Shoojit Sircar	Won	
Indian Film Festival of Melbourne	16–27 August 2015	Best Actor	Irrfan Khan (Note: Shared with Shahid Kapoor for Haider (2014).)	Won	
Indian Film Festival of Melbourne	16–27 August 2015	Best Actress	Deepika Padukone	Nominated	
Indian Film Festival of Russia	3–6 September 2015	Best Director	Shoojit Sircar	Won	
Indian Film Festival of Russia	3–6 September 2015	Best Film	Piku	Won	
International Indian Film Academy Awards	25 June 2016	Best Film	Piku	Nominated	
International Indian Film Academy Awards	25 June 2016	Best Director	Shoojit Sircar	Nominated	
International Indian Film Academy Awards	25 June 2016	Best Actor	Amitabh Bachchan	Nominated	
International Indian Film Academy Awards	25 June 2016	Best Actress	Deepika Padukone	Won	
International Indian Film Academy Awards	25 June 2016	Best Supporting Actor	Irrfan Khan	Nominated	
International Indian Film Academy Awards	25 June 2016	Best Story	Juhi Chaturvedi	Won	
International Indian Film Academy Awards	25 June 2016	Best Dialogue	Juhi Chaturvedi	Won	
Jagran Film Festival	4 October 2015	Best Director	Shoojit Sircar	Won	
Jagran Film Festival	4 October 2015	Best Screenplay	Juhi Chaturvedi	Won	
Mirchi Music Awards	29 February 2016	Best Background Score	Anupam Roy	Nominated	
National Film Awards	3 May 2016	Best Actor	Amitabh Bachchan	Won	
National Film Awards	3 May 2016	Best Original Screenplay	Juhi Chaturvedi (Note: Shared with Himanshu Sharma for Tanu Weds Manu Returns (2015).)	Won	
National Film Awards	3 May 2016	Best Dialogues	Juhi Chaturvedi	Won	
Producers Guild Film Awards	22 December 2015	Best Film	Piku	Nominated	
Producers Guild Film Awards	22 December 2015	Best Director	Shoojit Sircar	Nominated	
Producers Guild Film Awards	22 December 2015	Best Actor in a Leading Role	Amitabh Bachchan	Nominated	
Producers Guild Film Awards	22 December 2015	Best Actor in a Leading Role	Irrfan Khan	Nominated	
Producers Guild Film Awards	22 December 2015	Best Actress in a Leading Role	Deepika Padukone	Won	
Producers Guild Film Awards	22 December 2015	Best Story	Juhi Chaturvedi	Nominated	
Producers Guild Film Awards	22 December 2015	Best Screenplay	Juhi Chaturvedi	Nominated	
Producers Guild Film Awards	22 December 2015	Best Dialogue	Juhi Chaturvedi	Nominated	
Producers Guild Film Awards	22 December 2015	Best Lyrics	Anupam Roy (for song "Bezubaan")	Nominated	
Screen Awards	8 January 2016	Best Actor	Amitabh Bachchan (Note: Shared with Ranveer Singh for Bajirao Mastani (2015).)	Won	
Screen Awards	8 January 2016	Best Actress	Deepika Padukone	Won	
Screen Awards	8 January 2016	Best Actress (Popular Choice)	Deepika Padukone	Won	
Screen Awards	8 January 2016	Best Dialogue	Juhi Chaturvedi	Won	
Stardust Awards	21 December 2015	Film of the Year	Piku	Nominated	
Stardust Awards	21 December 2015	Actor of the Year – Male	Amitabh Bachchan	Nominated	
Stardust Awards	21 December 2015	Actor of the Year – Female	Deepika Padukone	Won	
Stardust Awards	21 December 2015	Best Actor in a Supporting Role – Male	Irrfan Khan	Nominated	
Times of India Film Awards	18 March 2016	Best Film	Piku	Nominated	
Times of India Film Awards	18 March 2016	Best Film (Critics)	Piku	Nominated	
Times of India Film Awards	18 March 2016	Best Director	Shoojit Sircar	Nominated	
Times of India Film Awards	18 March 2016	Best Actor – Male	Amitabh Bachchan	Nominated	
Times of India Film Awards	18 March 2016	Best Actor – Male (Critics)	Amitabh Bachchan	Won	
Times of India Film Awards	18 March 2016	Best Actor – Female	Deepika Padukone	Nominated	
Times of India Film Awards	18 March 2016	Best Supporting Actor – Male	Irrfan Khan	Nominated	
Zee Cine Awards	20 February 2016	Best Film	Piku	Nominated	
Zee Cine Awards	20 February 2016	Best Film (Critics)	Piku	Nominated	
Zee Cine Awards	20 February 2016	Best Director	Shoojit Sircar	Nominated	
Zee Cine Awards	20 February 2016	Best Actor (Critics) – Male	Amitabh Bachchan	Won	
Zee Cine Awards	20 February 2016	Best Actor (Critics) – Male	Irrfan Khan	Nominated	
Zee Cine Awards	20 February 2016	Best Actor – Female	Deepika Padukone	Nominated	
Zee Cine Awards	20 February 2016	Best Actor (Critics) – Female	Deepika Padukone	Won	
Zee Cine Awards	20 February 2016	Best Story	Juhi Chaturvedi	Won	
Zee Cine Awards	20 February 2016	Best Screenplay	Juhi Chaturvedi	Won	
Zee Cine Awards	20 February 2016	Best Dialogue	Juhi Chaturvedi	Won	

== See also ==
- List of Bollywood films of 2015
