= Federation of Indian Airlines =

- Abbreviation: FIA
- Formation: 2006; 20 years ago
- Type: Airline industry body
- Region served: India
- Members: 4 (2017)
- Chairman: Rahul Bhatia
- Associate Director: Ujjwal Dey
- Website: www.fiaindia.in

The Federation of Indian Airlines (FIA) is an airline industry body in India. Its members are IndiGo, SpiceJet and GoAir. The functions of the FIA are carried out by an Executive Council composed of the heads of each of the member airlines.

The FIA was founded in 2006. Air India was a founding member of the body, but withdrew in 2014. It rejoined the body in 2022. Jet Airways was a member of the FIA until it ceased operations due to bankruptcy in April 2019. As of March 2017, the four members of the FIA had a combined 80% share of the domestic aviation market.

In October 2016, the FIA filed an appeal in the Supreme Court challenging the aviation permits granted to AirAsia India. In February 2017, the Directorate General of Civil Aviation (DGCA) rejected the FIA's plea to cancel the permit granted to AirAsia India. In March 2017, the FIA opposed Qatar Airways plan to launch an airline in India.
