= Sunil Bhaskaran =

Indian businessman

- Citizenship: Indian
- Education: IIT Delhi; IIM Calcutta
- Occupation: Businessman
- Known for: Head of Air India Aviation Training Academy Former CEO and MD of AirAsia India Former Vice President of Tata Steel

Sunil Bhaskaran is the head of the newly created Air India Aviation Training Academy. He was the chief executive officer and managing director of AirAsia India and the former Vice President of corporate services at Tata Steel.

== Early life and education ==
Bhaskaran did his BTech from IIT Delhi in 1985. He did his post-graduation in Management from IIM Kolkata in 1987.

== Career ==
Bhaskaran started his career in 1987 as a management trainee at Tata Steel. After that, he became the Vice President of Corporate services at Tata Steel. He worked in Tata Steel for over 30 years. On 15 November 2018, he joined AirAsia India as the chief executive officer and managing director. He is also the former Chairman of Jamshedpur Football Club and board at Jusco.
