= Air India Cargo =

Subsidiary cargo airline of Air India

IATA	ICAO	Call sign
AI	AIC	AIRINDIA
- Founded: 1932; 94 years ago
- Ceased operations: 2012; 14 years ago
- Hubs: Indira Gandhi International Airport (Delhi)
- Secondary hubs: Chennai International Airport (Chennai); Chhatrapati Shivaji International Airport (Mumbai)
- Fleet size: 6
- Destinations: 13
- Parent company: Air India Limited
- Headquarters: Mumbai, India
- Key people: Arvind Jadhav (CMD)

Air India Cargo was a cargo airline and the freight carrying subsidiary of Air India, based in Mumbai. It operated freighter aircraft services off and on at different stages of its history, the latest being from 2006 to 2012. Although the company has stopped operating as an airline it continues to manage the belly cargo hold capacity of Air India's passenger fleet.

== History ==
Air India Cargo was set up in 1932, and started its freighter operations with a Douglas DC-3 aircraft, giving Air India the distinction of being the first Asian airline to operate freighters.

Between the 1980s and 1990s it operated Boeing 747 and Douglas DC-8 freighter aircraft on various international routes through other companies.

In 2006 the airline relaunched freighter services following the merger of Indian Airlines and its domestic subsidiary Alliance Air with Air India; which led to the acquisition of a single Boeing 737-200C aircraft from Alliance's fleet, plus ten additional passenger versions of the aircraft, of which five were converted to freighters. One of these was also painted in Indian Airlines' old livery for a brief period after conversion. All six aircraft were flying on Air India Cargo domestic routes.

Air India also converted four of its Airbus A310s. These were deployed on the Dammam-Frankfurt route. After ending international operations two were leased out to new cargo startup Aryan Cargo Express, while a third was sold to an African company.

In November 2007, Air India partnered with GATI for a dedicated freighter service using the 737s.

In July 2024, Air India was reported to be "consolidating its cargo operations" and plans to start a separate entity or a subsidiary like it to handle cargo operations with dedicated freighters. There has been a 30% increase in the cargo revenues of the Air India Group in FY22-24. The cargo volume is expected to increase to 2.5 million tonnes by 2027. Air India is also developing a "mother software" to handle cargo data and revenue management. The airline is streamlining its cargo operations for optimisation of cargo handling. The airline has initiated a programme to "onboard, engage and expand with regional, national and global customers".

== Destinations ==
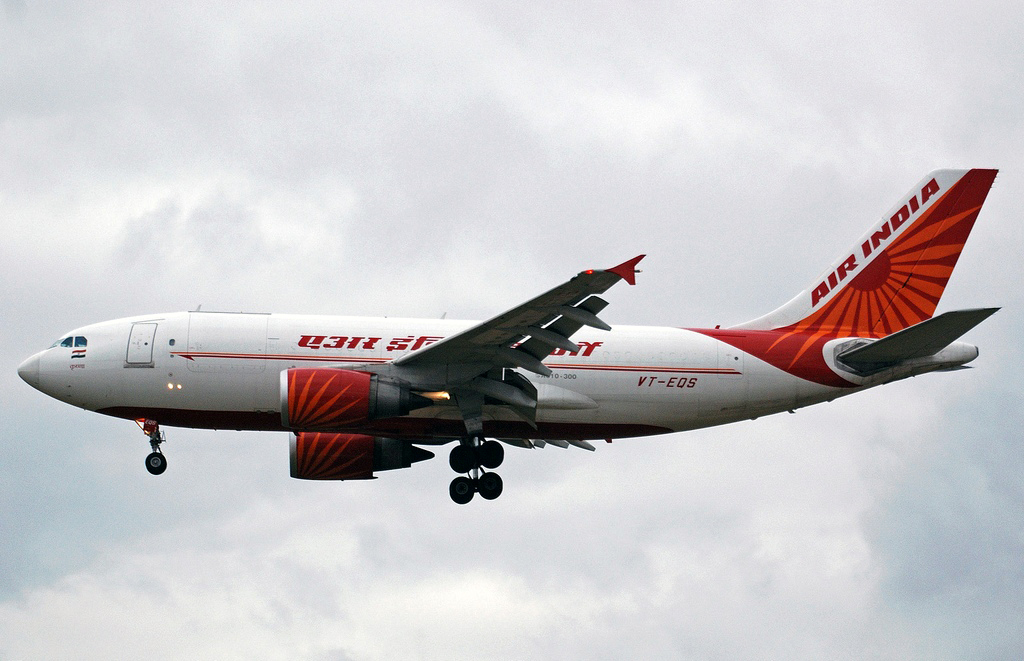
Air India Cargo Airbus A310-304F

Air India Cargo served the following cities with freighter aircraft until January 2012; it also had ground truck-transportation arrangements on select destinations.

India

- Delhi
  - Indira Gandhi International Airport Hub
- Goa
  - Dabolim Airport
- Gujarat
  - Ahmedabad – Sardar Vallabhbhai Patel International Airport
- Karnataka
  - Bangalore – Kempegowda International Airport
- Kerala
  - Kozhikode – Calicut International Airport
  - Kochi – Cochin International Airport
  - Thiruvananthapuram – Trivandrum International Airport
- Maharashtra
  - Mumbai – Chhatrapati Shivaji Maharaj International Airport Hub
- Manipur
  - Imphal – Imphal International Airport
- Tamil Nadu
  - Chennai – Chennai International Airport Hub
- Telangana
  - Hyderabad – Rajiv Gandhi International Airport
- Uttar Pradesh
  - Lucknow – Amausi Airport
- West Bengal
  - Kolkata – Netaji Subhas Chandra Bose International Airport

International routes included Dammam and Frankfurt, some other routes were also operated.

== Fleet ==
=== Previous aircraft operated ===
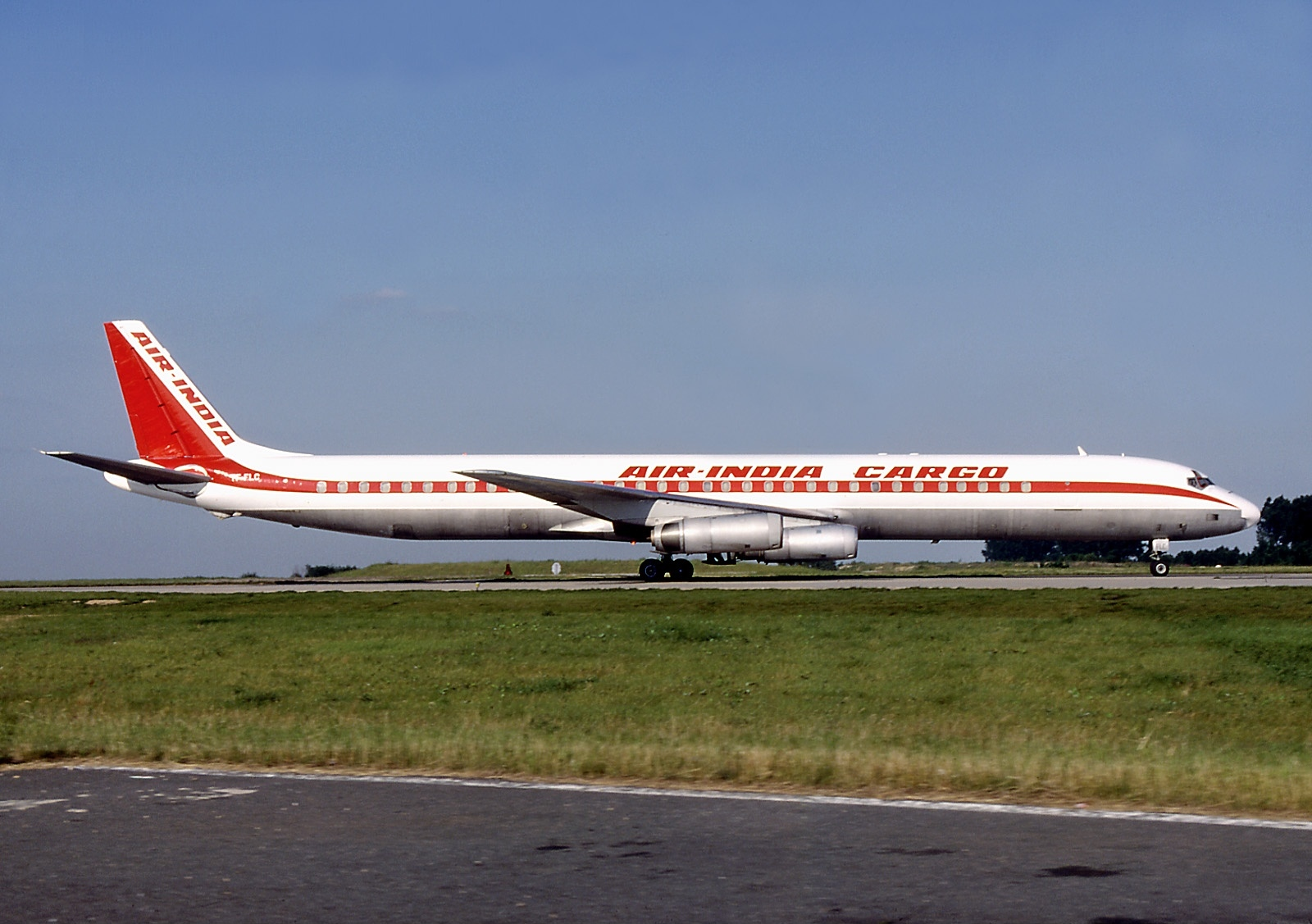
Air India Cargo Douglas DC-8-63CF

Air India Cargo Fleet
Aircraft	Total	Status
Boeing 737-200(Adv)F	5	Scrapped; company ceased operations in 2012
Boeing 737-200C(Adv)F	1	Scrapped; company ceased operations in 2012
Total	6	

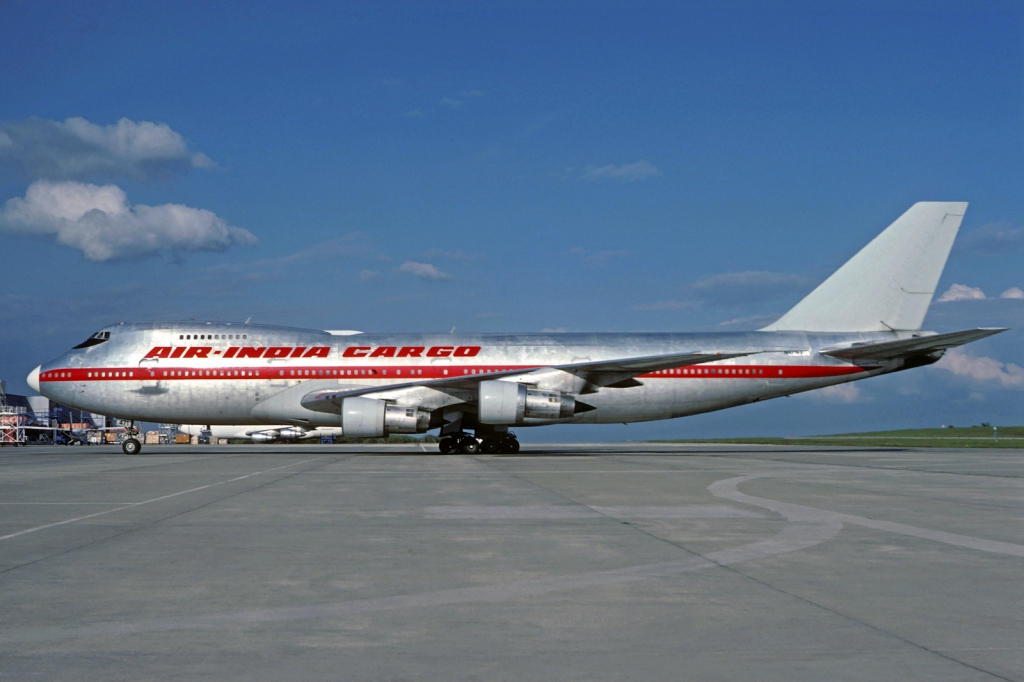
Air India Cargo 747-237C at Paris CDG

- Airbus A310-300F
- Boeing 747-200F
- Douglas DC-3F
- Douglas DC-8-73F

== See also ==
- Air India
- List of airlines of India
- List of airports in India
- Transport in India
- Star Alliance
- Air India Express
