= Air India Limited =

Indian airline company

- Formerly: National Aviation Company of India Limited (2007–2010)
- Type: Private
- Industry: Aviation
- Founded: 30 March 2007; 19 years ago
- Headquarters: Gurugram, Haryana, India
- Key people: N. Chandrasekaran (chairman); Tewolde Gebremariam (CEO & MD)
- Services: Passenger air transport; Air cargo
- Revenue: ▼₹71,869.94 crore (2026)
- Net income: ▼ −₹22,238.23 crore (2026)
- Owner: Tata Sons (73.82%); Singapore Airlines (25.1%)
- Number of employees: 30,000+ (2024)
- Subsidiaries: Air India Express Limited; AI Fleet Services IFSC Limited
- Website: www.airindia.com

Air India Limited is an Indian airline company headquartered in Gurugram, Haryana. It directly operates Air India, the flag carrier and full-service airline of India, and owns Air India Express Limited, its low-cost airline subsidiary. The company also owns AI Fleet Services IFSC Limited and holds interests in ground-handling and aviation-training joint ventures.

Air India Limited is controlled by Tata Sons. Singapore Airlines became a shareholder following the merger of Vistara into Air India in November 2024 and holds a 25.1% stake.

== History ==
=== Formation and government ownership ===
Air India Limited was incorporated on 30 March 2007 as the National Aviation Company of India Limited (NACIL) as part of the Government of India's merger of the state-owned Air India and Indian Airlines.

The company was renamed Air India Limited on 26 October 2010.

During government ownership, Air India Limited operated the Air India airline and controlled several aviation companies, including Air India Express, Alliance Air Aviation Limited, AI Airport Services Limited and AI Engineering Services Limited. It also held a 50% interest in Air India SATS Airport Services.

=== Privatisation ===
In June 2017, the Government of India gave in-principle approval for the strategic disinvestment of Air India. Before the sale, subsidiaries, assets and liabilities that were not part of the transaction were transferred to the government-owned Air India Assets Holding Limited (AIAHL).

On 8 October 2021, the government announced Talace Private Limited, a wholly owned subsidiary of Tata Sons, as the successful bidder for Air India Limited. The transaction included Air India Limited, its 100% ownership of Air India Express and its 50% interest in Air India SATS Airport Services.

The transaction valued the enterprise at ₹18,000 crore, comprising ₹2,700 crore in cash and the assumption of ₹15,300 crore of debt. Ownership and management control were transferred to the Tata Group on 27 January 2022.

=== Consolidation of Tata airlines ===
Following the acquisition, the Tata Group began consolidating its four airline operations into two carriers.

In 2022, Air India Limited acquired AirAsia India from Tata Sons. The airline was later renamed AIX Connect. The Competition Commission of India approved the acquisition in June 2022.

AIX Connect was merged into Air India Express Limited on 1 October 2024, with Air India Express Limited surviving the merger.

Separately, Tata Sons and Singapore Airlines announced in November 2022 that Vistara, operated by Tata SIA Airlines Limited, would be merged into Air India. The merger was completed on 12 November 2024. Air India Limited was the surviving company and the combined full-service airline continued under the Air India brand.

Singapore Airlines received a 25.1% stake in the enlarged Air India as part of the transaction.

The two mergers consolidated the Tata Group's four airline operations, Air India, Vistara, Air India Express and AirAsia India/AIX Connect, into two carriers: full-service Air India and low-cost Air India Express.

== Corporate affairs ==
=== Ownership ===
Air India Limited is a privately held company controlled by Tata Sons.

Air India Limited's annual return for FY2024–25 recorded Tata Sons Private Limited as its holding company with a 73.82% shareholding.

Singapore Airlines acquired a 25.1% interest in Air India Limited following the Vistara merger in November 2024. Singapore Airlines continued to report a 25.1% strategic stake in the Air India Group in July 2026.

=== Management ===
Natarajan Chandrasekaran, chairman of Tata Sons, is chairman of Air India.

Campbell Wilson was chief executive officer and managing director from 2022 to 2026.

In August 2026, Air India's board appointed former Ethiopian Airlines chief executive Tewolde Gebremariam as chief executive officer and managing director.

=== Headquarters ===
Air India Limited is headquartered at the Vatika One-on-One complex in Gurugram, Haryana.

== Corporate structure ==
Air India Limited directly operates the full-service Air India airline. Air India is not a separate subsidiary of Air India Limited. Air India Express, by contrast, is operated by Air India Express Limited, a separate company wholly owned by Air India Limited.

Air India Limited's statutory filings identify Air India Express Limited and AI Fleet Services IFSC Limited as wholly owned subsidiaries. Air India SATS Airport Services Private Limited and Airbus India Training Centre Private Limited are 50% joint ventures.

Corporate interests of Air India Limited
Entity	Relationship	Ownership	Principal activity
Air India	Direct operation	Not applicable	Full-service airline
Air India Express Limited	Subsidiary	100%	Low-cost airline
AI Fleet Services IFSC Limited	Subsidiary	100%	Aircraft financing and leasing
Air India SATS Airport Services Private Limited	Joint venture	50%	Ground and cargo handling
Airbus India Training Centre Private Limited	Joint venture	50%	Aviation training

=== Air India ===
Air India is the full-service airline and flag carrier operated directly by Air India Limited. It is not a separately incorporated subsidiary of Air India Limited.

Following the merger of Vistara into Air India Limited on 12 November 2024, the combined full-service operation continued under the Air India brand and the AI airline code.

=== Air India Express ===
Air India Express is the group's low-cost airline. It is operated by Air India Express Limited, a wholly owned subsidiary of Air India Limited.

AIX Connect, formerly AirAsia India, was merged into Air India Express Limited on 1 October 2024.

=== AI Fleet Services IFSC ===
AI Fleet Services IFSC Limited is a wholly owned subsidiary of Air India Limited based in GIFT City, Gujarat. It is used for aircraft financing and leasing activities.

=== Air India SATS Airport Services ===
Air India SATS Airport Services Private Limited (AISATS) is a 50:50 joint venture between Air India Limited and SATS Ltd.

AISATS provides passenger handling, ramp handling, baggage handling, aircraft services and cargo-handling services at airports in India.

=== Airbus India Training Centre ===
Airbus India Training Centre Private Limited is a joint venture in which Air India Limited holds a 50% interest.

== Operations ==
Following the completion of the airline mergers in 2024, the Air India Group had two passenger carriers: Air India and Air India Express.

At the completion of the Vistara merger in November 2024, the two airlines together operated approximately 300 aircraft, served 55 domestic and 48 international destinations, and operated about 8,300 flights each week. The group employed more than 30,000 people.

Air India operates the group's full-service domestic and international network. Air India Express operates the group's low-cost network.

The group has undertaken a multi-year transformation programme since privatisation. This has included fleet renewal, refurbishment of existing aircraft, investment in training and maintenance infrastructure, and changes to passenger products and services.

== Financial performance ==
Financial performance of Air India Limited
Financial year	Revenue (₹ crore)	Net profit/loss (₹ crore)	Ref.
2022–23	42,239.12	–13,960.36	
2023–24	52,496.44	–6,676.82	
2024–25	78,636	–10,859	
2025–26	71,869.94	–22,238.23	
