= Air India =

National airline of India

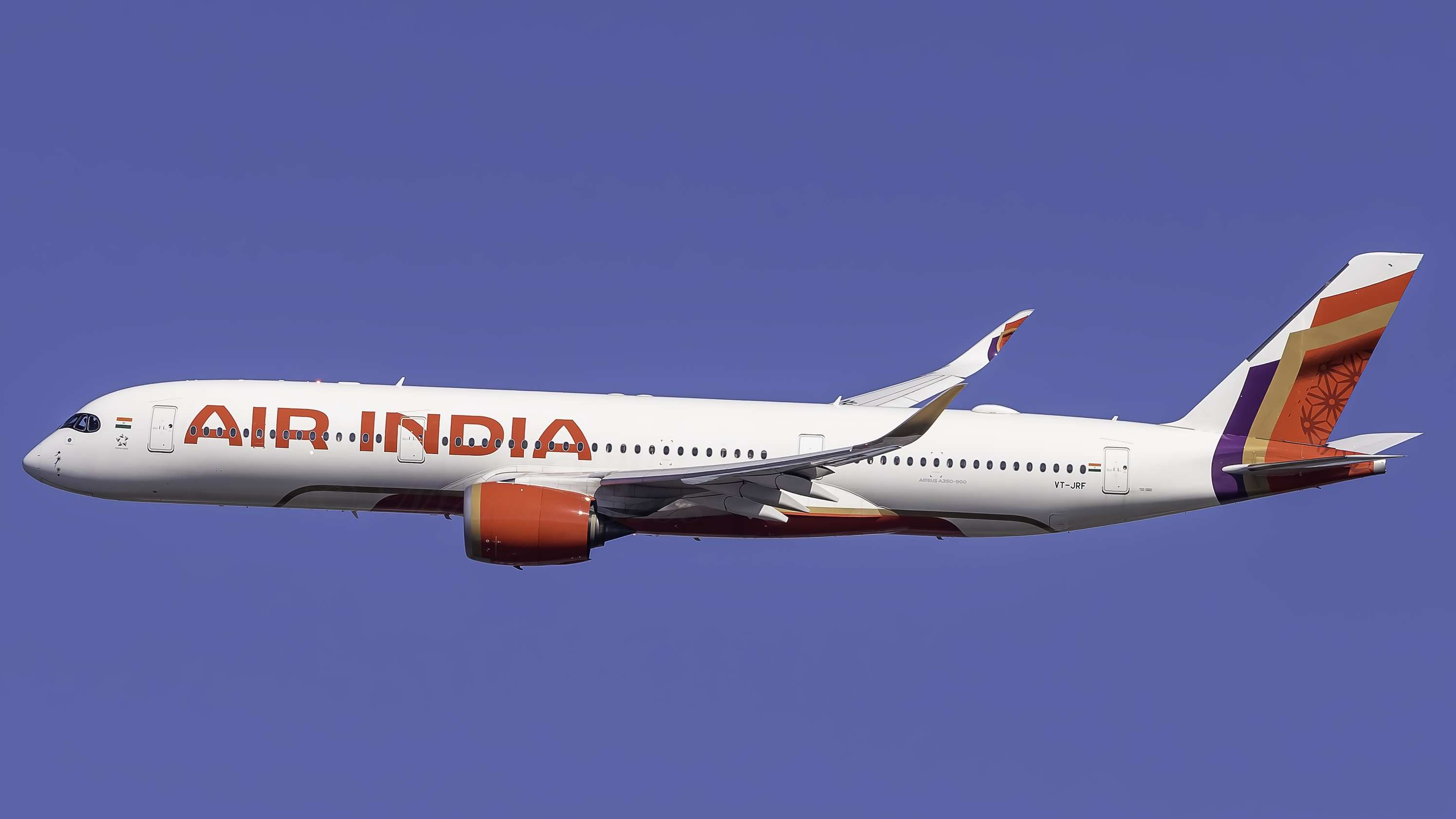
- Air India Airbus A350-900
IATA	ICAO	Call sign
AI	AIC	AIRINDIA
- Founded: 15 October 1932; 94 years ago (as Tata Airlines)
- Commenced operations: 29 July 1946; 80 years ago
- Hubs: Delhi
- Secondary hubs: Bengaluru; Mumbai
- Frequent-flyer program: Maharaja Club
- Alliance: Star Alliance
- Subsidiaries: Air India Express
- Fleet size: 189
- Destinations: 87
- Parent company: Air India Limited
- Headquarters: Gurugram, Haryana, India
- Key people: Natarajan Chandrasekaran (chairman); Tewolde Gebremariam (CEO & MD)
- Founder: JRD Tata
- Revenue: ▲₹610.8 billion (US$6.5 billion) (FY 2025)
- Profit: ▼−₹39.76 billion (US$420 million) (FY 2025)
- Website: www.airindia.com

Air India is the flag carrier of India, headquartered in Gurugram, Haryana. The airline is owned by Air India Limited, which is owned by the Tata Group (74.9%) and Singapore Airlines (25.1%). The airline is a member of Star Alliance since 11 July 2014. As of November 2025, the airline serves 87 domestic and international destinations, from its primary hub at Indira Gandhi International Airport, and secondary hubs at Kempegowda International Airport and Chhatrapati Shivaji Maharaj International Airport. The airline operates a fleet of Airbus and Boeing aircraft, and is the second-largest airline in India by passenger volume, after IndiGo.

Founded in 1932 as Tata Airlines by JRD Tata, the airline was nationalised by the Government of India in 1953 and renamed to Air India following World War II. On 21 February 1960, it took delivery of its first Boeing 707 named Gauri Shankar and became the first Asian airline to introduce a jet aircraft in its fleet. In 2000 to 2001, attempts were made to privatise Air India, and from 2006 onwards it suffered losses following its merger with Indian Airlines. Another privatisation attempt was launched in 2017, culminating in the return of ownership of the airline and associated properties to the Tata Group after 69 years in 2022.

Air India also operates flights to domestic and Asian destinations through its subsidiary Air India Express. Air India operates a mix of narrow body aircraft such as the Airbus A320 family used for most domestic and short-haul international routes and wide body aircraft such as the Airbus A350, Boeing 777 and Boeing 787 for long haul international routes. Air India's mascot is the Maharajah ('great king'), and the erstwhile logo consisted of a flying swan with the wheel of Konark inside it, before being replaced by a new logo inspired by the airline's Jharokha window pattern in 2023.

== History ==
=== Early years (1932–1945) ===
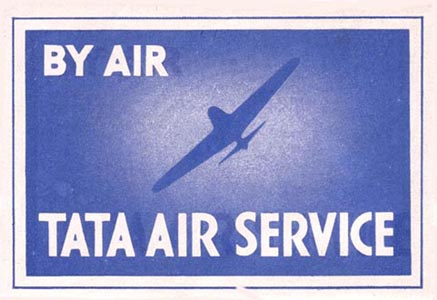
Tata Air Service

Air India had its origin in Tata Sons, founded by JRD Tata, an Indian aviator and business tycoon. In April 1932, Tata won a contract to carry mail for Imperial Airways and the aviation department of Tata Sons was formed with two single-engine de Havilland Puss Moths. On 15 October 1932, Tata flew a Puss Moth carrying air mail from Karachi to Bombay (currently Mumbai) and the aircraft continued to Madras (currently Chennai) piloted by Nevill Vintcent, a former Royal Air Force pilot and friend of Tata. The airline fleet consisted of a Puss Moth aircraft and a Leopard Moth. Initial service included weekly airmail service between Karachi and Madras via Ahmedabad and Bombay. In its first year of operation, the airline flew 260,000 kilometres (160,000 mi), carrying 155 passengers and 9.72 tonnes (10.71 tons) of mail and made a profit of ₹60,000 (US$640). Later, the airline launched a domestic flight from Bombay to Trivandrum (now Thiruvananthapuram) with a six-seater Miles Merlin. In 1938, it was renamed Tata Air Services and later as Tata Airlines. Delhi and Colombo were added to the destinations in 1938. During World War II, the airline helped the Royal Air Force with troop movements, shipping of supplies, rescue of refugees and maintenance of planes.

=== Post-Independence (1946–2000) ===
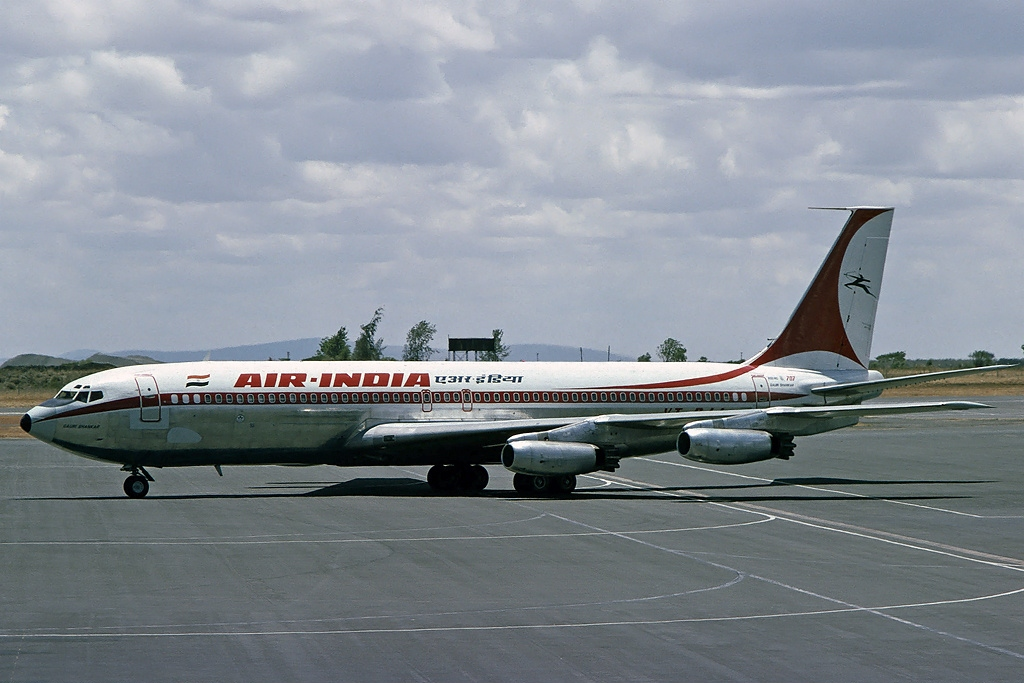
Air India became the first Asian carrier to induct a jet aircraft with the Boeing 707–420

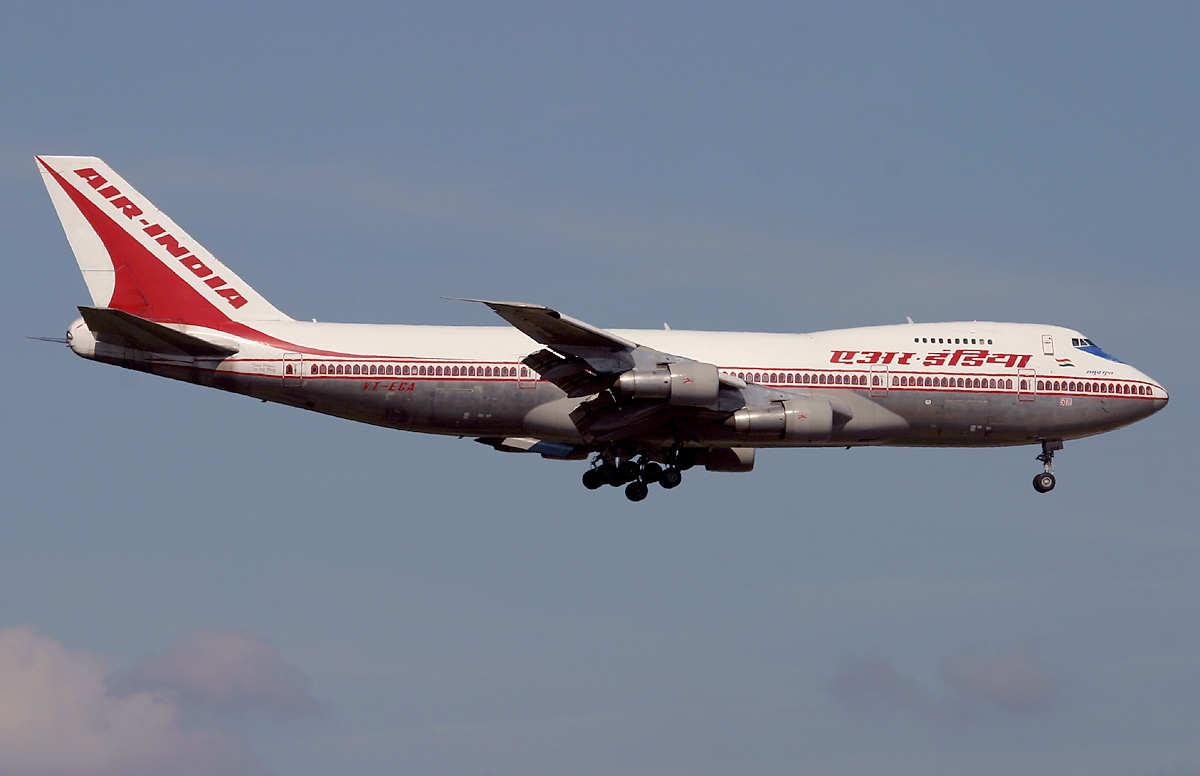
Air India Boeing 747-200B. The airline operated 11 Boeing 747-200B aircraft in total.

After World War II, regular commercial service was restored in India and Tata Airlines became a public limited company on 29 July 1946 under the name Air India. After the Indian independence in 1947, 49% of the airline was acquired by the Government of India in 1948. On 8 June 1948, a Lockheed Constellation L-749A named Malabar Princess (registered VT-CQP) took off from Bombay bound for London Heathrow marking the airline's first international flight. In 1953, the Government of India passed the Air Corporations Act and purchased a majority stake in the carrier from Tata Sons, though its founder, JRD Tata, would continue as chairman until 1977. The company was renamed as Air India International Limited and the domestic services were transferred to Indian Airlines as a part of restructuring. From 1948 to 1950, the airline introduced services to Nairobi in Africa and to major European destinations Rome, Paris and Düsseldorf. The airline took delivery of its first Lockheed Constellation L-1049 named Rani of Jhansi (registered VT-DGL) and inaugurated services to Bangkok, Hong Kong, Tokyo and Singapore.

On 21 February 1960, Air India International inducted its first Boeing 707–420 named Gauri Shankar (registered VT-DJJ), thereby becoming the first Asian airline to induct a jet aircraft in its fleet. The airline inaugurated services to New York on 14 May 1960. On 8 June 1962, the airline's name was officially truncated to Air India and on 11 June 1962, Air India became the world's first all-jet airline.

In 1971, the airline took delivery of its first Boeing 747-200B named Emperor Ashoka (registered VT-EBD) and introduced a new Palace in the Sky livery and branding. The airline operated 11 Boeing 747-200 in total. In 1986, Air India took delivery of its first Airbus A310-300 and in 1988, the airline took delivery of Boeing 747-300M. In 1993, Air India took delivery of a Boeing 747-400 named Konark (registered VT-ESM) and operated the first non-stop flight between New York and Delhi.

=== Financial trouble, merger with Indian and later (2000–2022) ===
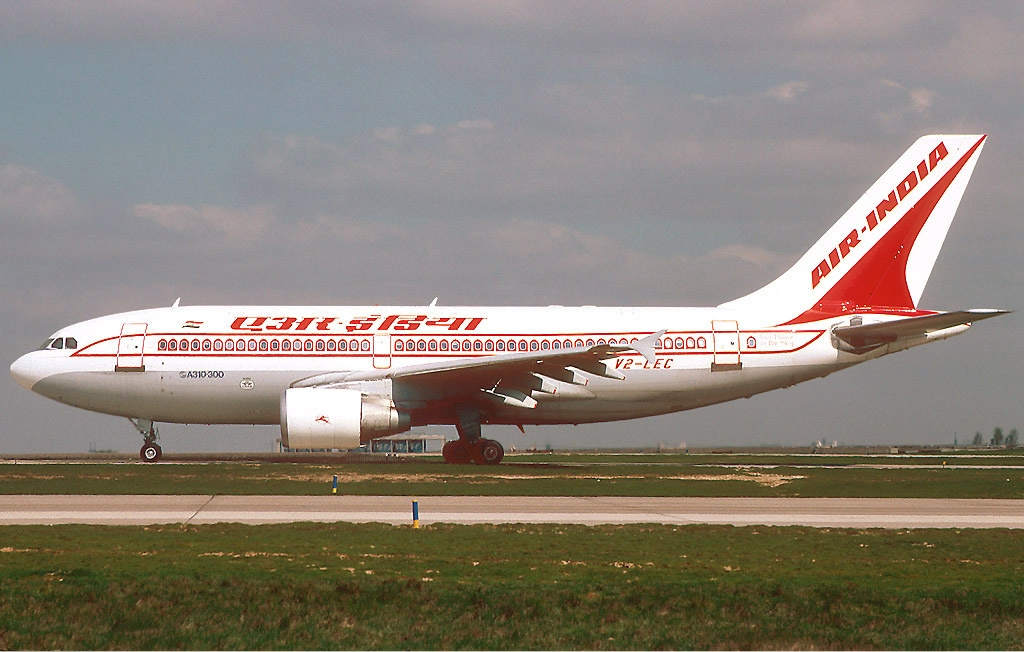
Air India Airbus A310-300. It sold three A300s in March 2009 due to debt.

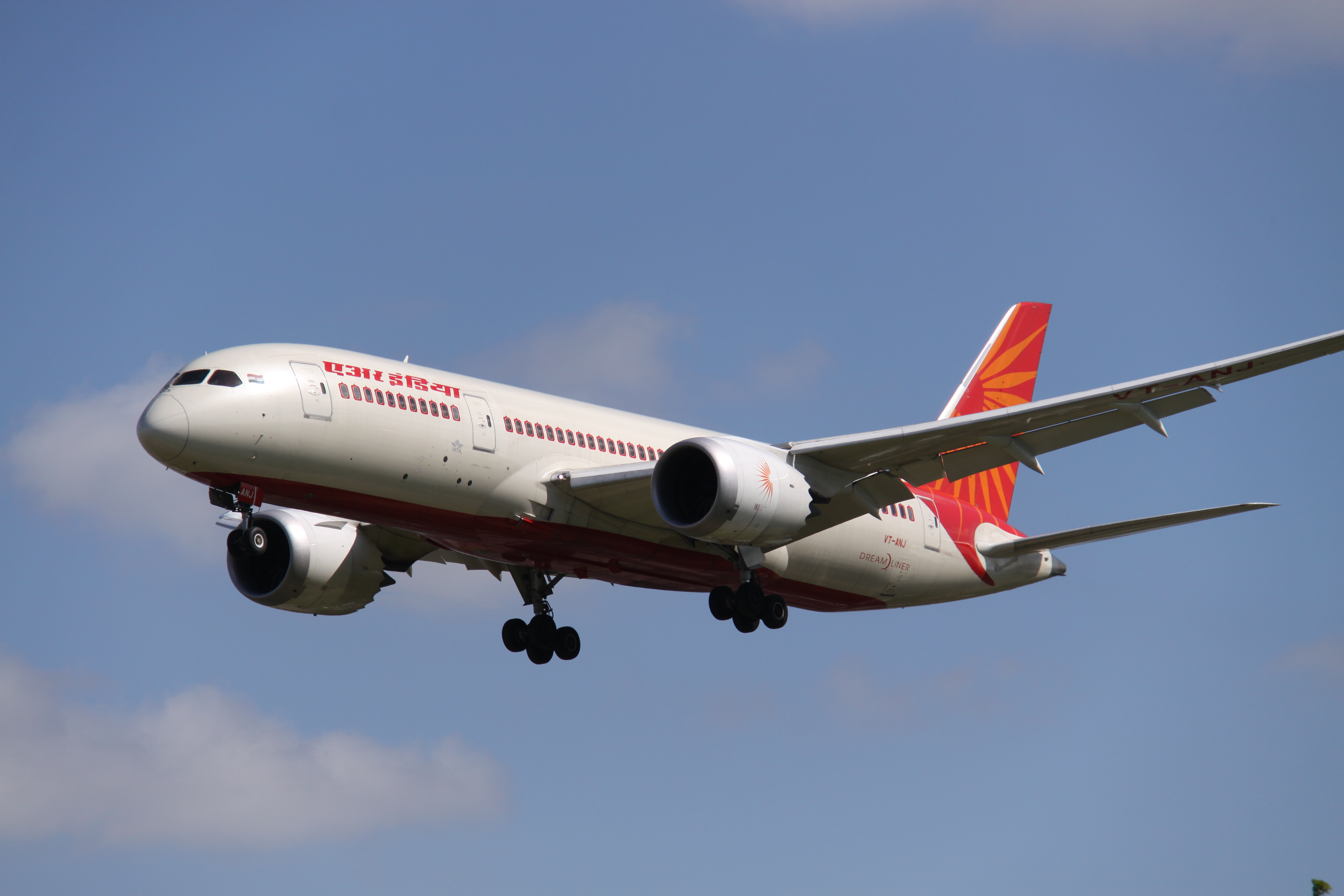
In January 2013, Air India cleared some of its debt by selling and leasing back the newly acquired Boeing 787 Dreamliners. Also, the airline posted its first positive EBITDA after almost six years.

In 2000–01, attempts were made to re-privatise Air India. In 2000, Air India introduced services to Shanghai, China. On 23 May 2001, the Ministry of Civil Aviation charged Michael Mascarenhas, the then-managing director, with corruption. According to the ministry reports, the airline lost approximately ₹570 million (US$6.1 million) because of extra commissions that Mascarenhas sanctioned, and he was later suspended from the airline. In May 2004, Air India launched a wholly owned low cost subsidiary called Air-India Express connecting cities in India with the Middle East and Southeast Asia. Until 2007, Air India mainly operated on international long-haul routes while Indian Airlines operated on domestic and international short-haul routes. In 2007, Air India and Indian Airlines were merged under Air India Limited and the airline took delivery of its first Boeing 777 aircraft. The airline was invited to be a part of the Star Alliance in 2007.

Around 2006, both Air India and Indian Airlines showed signs of financial crisis as combined losses were ₹7.7 billion (US$82 million). After the merger of Indian Airlines with Air India in 2007, the losses went up to ₹72 billion (US$770 million) by March 2009. In July 2009, State Bank of India was appointed to prepare a road map for the recovery of the airline. The carrier sold three Airbus A300 and one Boeing 747-300M in March 2009 for $18.75 million to finance the debt. By March 2011, Air India had accumulated a debt of ₹426 billion (US$4.6 billion) and an operating loss of ₹220 billion (US$2.4 billion), and was seeking ₹429 billion (US$4.6 billion) from the government. A report by the Comptroller and Auditor General blamed the decision to buy 111 new planes and the ill-timed merger with Indian Airlines for the poor financial situation. In August 2011, the invitation to join Star Alliance was suspended as a result of its failure to meet the minimum standards for the membership. The government pumped ₹32 billion (US$340 million) into Air India in March 2012.

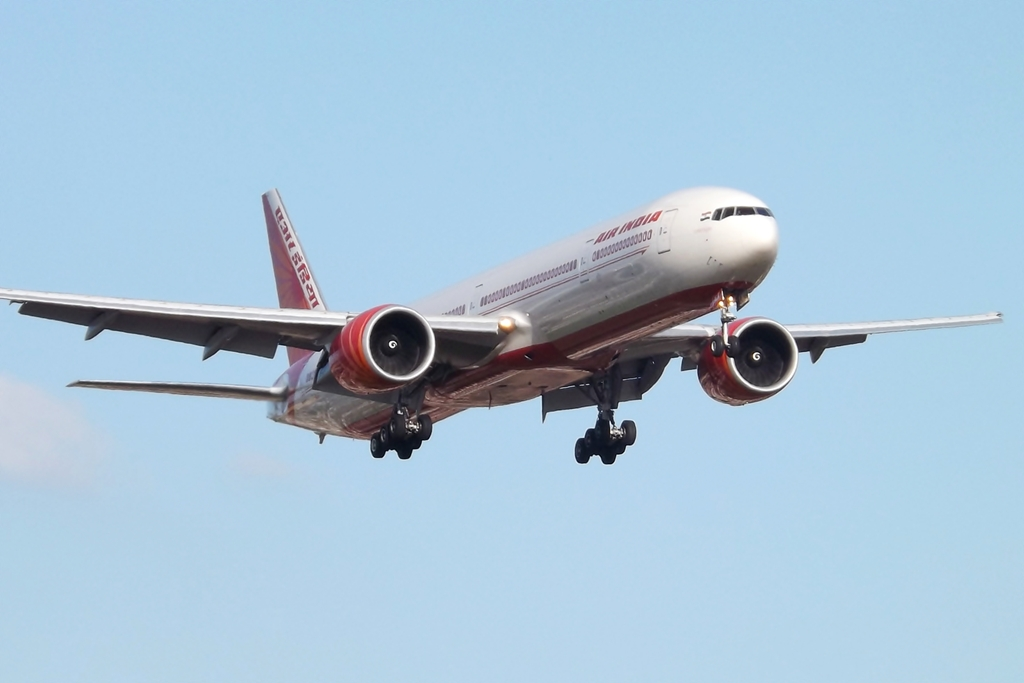
Air India Boeing 777-300ER

On 1 March 2009, Air India made Frankfurt Airport its international hub for onward connections to the United States from India. However, the airline shut down the Frankfurt hub on 30 October 2010 because of high operating costs. In 2010, financially less lucrative routes were terminated and the airline planned to open a new hub for its international flights at Dubai. In 2012, a study commissioned by the Corporate Affairs Ministry recommended that Air India should be partly privatised. In May 2012, the carrier invited offers from banks to raise $800 million via external commercial borrowing and bridge financing. In May 2012, the airline was fined $80,000 by the US Transportation Department for failing to post customer service and tarmac delay contingency plans on its website and adequately inform passengers about its optional fees.

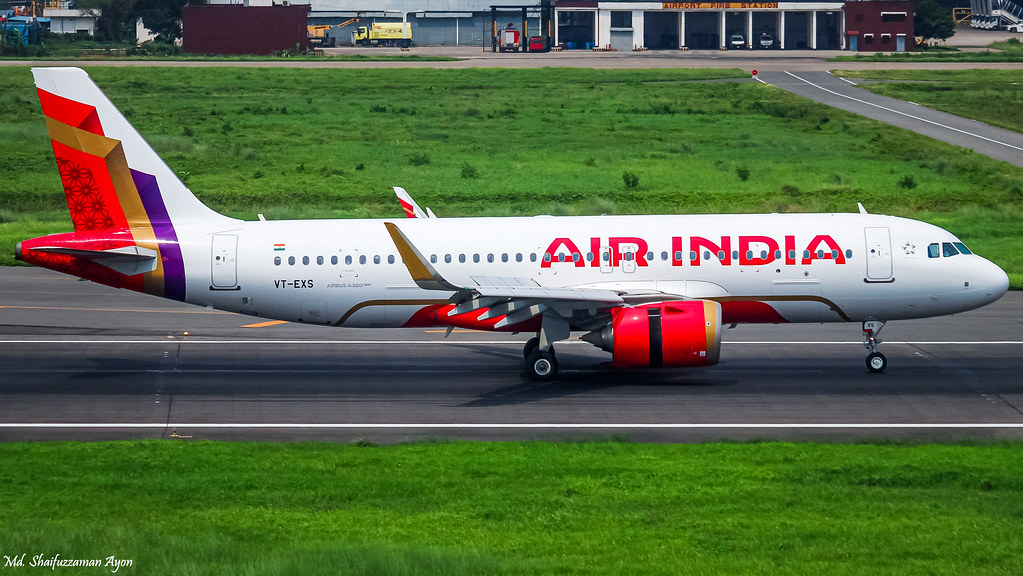
Air India Airbus A320neo

In 2013, the then-Civil Aviation Minister Ajit Singh stated privatisation was the key to the airline's survival. However, the opposition led by the BJP and the CPI(M) slammed the government. In 2013, the Indian government planned to delay equity infusion of ₹300 billion (US$3.2 billion) that was slated to be infused into the airline slowly over eight years. In January 2013, Air India cleared a part of its pending dues through funds raised by selling and leasing back the newly acquired Boeing 787 Dreamliners. In March 2013, the airline posted its first positive EBITDA after almost six years and 20% growth in its operating revenue since the previous financial year. Air India Limited split its engineering and cargo businesses into two separate subsidiaries, Air India Engineering Services Limited (AIESL) and Air India Transport Services Limited (AITSL) in 2013. In December 2013, the airline appointed veteran pilot SPS Puri as its head of operations. The appointment was criticised by the Air India pilots union as Puri allegedly has multiple violations to his name.

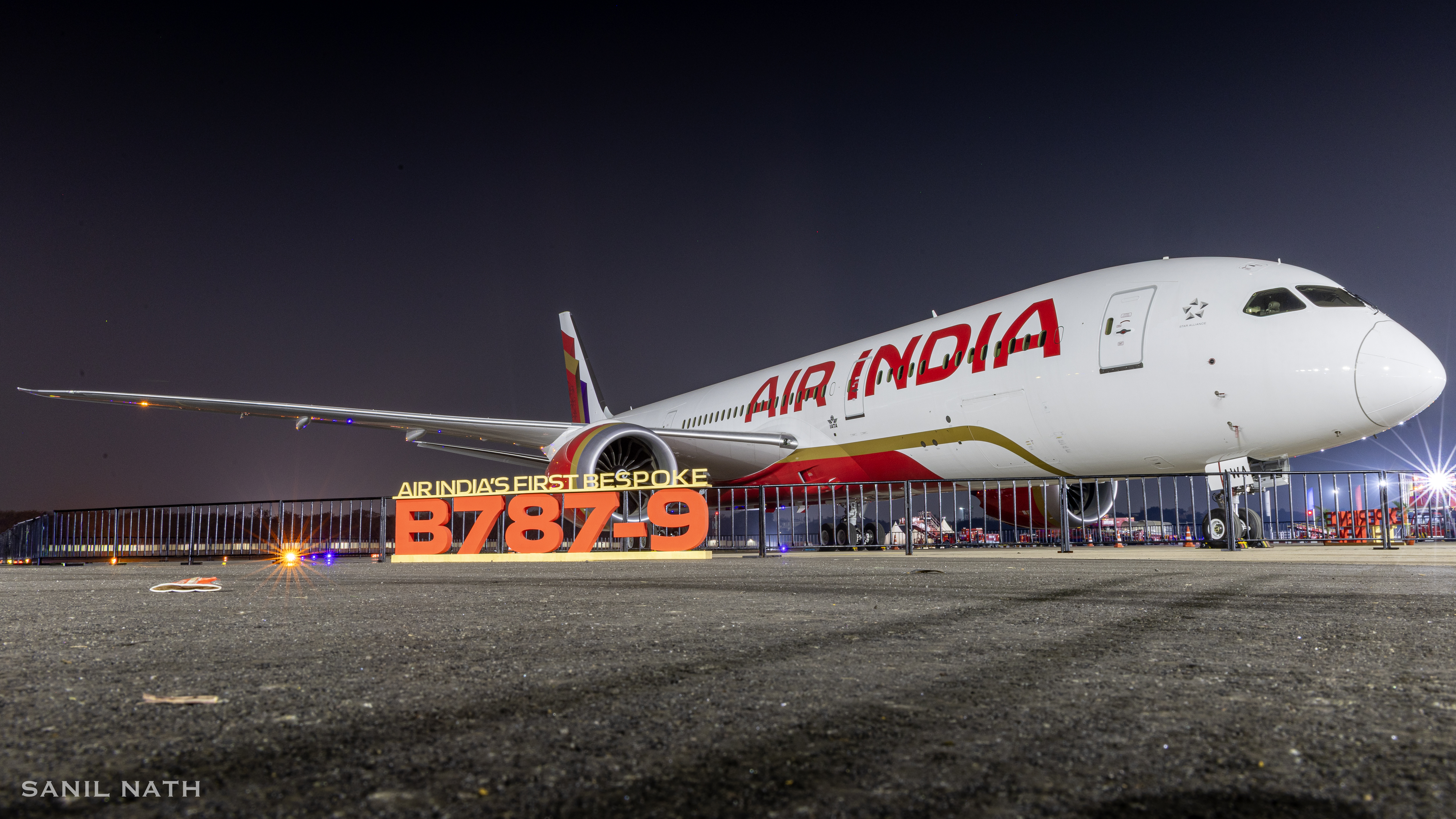
Air India New Boeing 787-9

Air India became the 27th member of Star Alliance on 11 July 2014. In August 2015, it signed an agreement with Citibank and State Bank of India to raise $300 million in external commercial borrowing to meet working capital requirements. For FY 2014–15, its revenue, operating loss and net loss were ₹198 billion (US$2.1 billion), ₹2.171 billion (US$23 million) and ₹5.41 billion (US$58 million) compared FY 2011–12, which were ₹147 billion (US$1.6 billion), ₹5.138 billion (US$55 million) and ₹7.55 billion (US$81 million). As of February 2016, Air India was the third largest carrier in India, after IndiGo and Jet Airways with a market share of 15.4%.

On 21 May 2021, it was reported that Air India was subjected to a cyberattack where the personal details of about 4.5 million customers around the world were compromised, including passport, credit card details, birthdates, name and ticket information. Air India's data processor, SITA, reported the data breach to Air India in around February 2021. The data breach involved all information which was registered in the SITA data processor between 26 August 2011 and 20 February 2021, and the cyberattackers gained access to the systems for a period of 22 days. Air India told passengers that there was no conclusive evidence on whether any misuse of the personal data had been reported and urged passengers to immediately change their passwords.

=== Post privatisation (2022–present) ===
On 28 June 2017, the Government of India approved the privatisation of Air India and set up a committee to decide the details. In March 2018, the Government issued an Expression of Interest (EOI) to sell a 76% stake in Air India, along with low-cost airline Air India Express, and a 50% stake in AISATS, a ground handling joint venture with Singapore Airport Terminal Services (SATS). According to the EOI, the new owner would have to take on a debt of ₹333.92 billion (US$3.6 billion) and a bid would have to be submitted by mid-May as the Government wanted to complete the selling process by the end of 2018. However, no private firms showed any interest to buy a share in the debt-laden airline.

Having failed to sell off a majority stake in the airline, the Government decided to completely exit the airline and invited fresh EOIs on 27 January 2020. In order to attract bidders this time, the government reduced the debt burden on Air India by moving nearly ₹300 billion (US$3.2 billion) of the company's debts and liabilities to a Special Purpose Vehicle (SPV). In view of the prevailing situation arising out of COVID-19, the last date for submission of interest was extended multiple times and the Government eventually received EOIs from seven parties by December 2020. Five of these parties were disqualified and the Government invited financial bids for Air India from the two qualified parties in September 2021.

In September 2021, Spice Jet's Ajay Singh-led consortium and Tata Sons submitted their financial bids for Air India. On 8 October 2021, Air India along with its low cost carrier Air India Express and fifty per cent of AISATS, a ground handling company, were sold for ₹180 billion (US$1.9 billion) to Tata Group. On 27 January 2022, the airline was officially handed over to Tata Group. On 14 February 2022, after its re-privatisation, the airline appointed İlker Aycı, former chairman of Turkish Airlines as its new CEO and managing director to take charge on or before 1 April 2022 which did not materialise. In March 2022, Natarajan Chandrasekaran, the chairman of Tata Sons was appointed as the chairman of the airline and in May 2022, Campbell Wilson was announced as the CEO and MD.

After the airline's acquisition, Tata Group began discussions on bringing the other airlines, including Vistara and AirAsia India, where it held a stake, under a unified umbrella. In November 2022, Air India acquired AirAsia's stake in AirAsia India, renamed it AIX Connect and announced plans to merge it with Air India Express. On 29 November 2022, Air India announced the merger with Vistara by March 2024 with Singapore Airlines which owns a 49% stake in Vistara getting a 25% stake in the newly formed airline. Vistara brand would be discontinued post the merger and the brand will operate under the Air India name. The National Company Law Tribunal approved the merger between Air India and Vistara on 6 June 2024, followed by Singapore Airlines' FDI approval by the Indian government on 30 August 2024. On 12 November 2024, the merger between Vistara and Air India was completed.

On 15 September 2022, the Tata Group announced Vihaan, a five-year transformation goal aimed at restructuring and transforming Air India in phases. As part of the plan, Air India announced flights to additional international destinations. The route expansion was supported by improving air-worthiness of existing fleet and leasing aircraft from other airlines. On 14 February 2023, Air India announced an order for 470 aircraft consisting of 250 from Airbus and 220 from Boeing at a cost of US$70 billion, which set the record for the world's largest aircraft order at the time. On 10 August 2023, the airline announced a rebranding exercise named "Vista" with a new livery and logo. On 1 January 2024, Air India announced that it will begin operating its first Airbus A350 aircraft on domestic routes from 22 January 2024 before expanding to international destinations.

In July 2024, Air India was reported to be "consolidating its cargo operations" and plans to start a separate entity or a subsidiary like Air India Cargo to handle cargo operations with dedicated freighters. There has been a 30% increase in the cargo revenues of the Air India Group in FY22-24. The cargo volume is expected to increase to 2.5 million tonnes by 2027. Air India is also developing a "mother software" to handle cargo data and revenue management. The airline is streamlining its cargo operations for optimisation of cargo handling. The airline has initiated a programme to "onboard, engage and expand with regional, national and global customers".

In September 2024, Air India announced a $400 million refurbishment programme to modernise 67 of its older aircraft. The programme will commence with the overhaul of 27 narrow-body Airbus A320neo planes, followed by 40 wide-body Boeing aircraft.

In October 2025, Air India was reported to be in advanced talks to acquire up to 300 additional aircraft from Airbus and Boeing, including 80–100 widebody models such as the Airbus A350 or Boeing 777X, as part of its fleet renewal and international expansion. In November 2025, Air India discovered and repositioned a mothballed Boeing 737-200 that had been abandoned at Kolkata's airport, which had been left outside records for thirteen years after service with the India Post. The plane, that Air India recorded as formally retired in 2012, was shipped to the firm's office in Bengaluru, where it will be used to train maintenance engineers and flight crew.

In August 2026, the Board of Directors appointed former Ethiopian Airlines Group chief Tewolde Gebremariam as Chief Executive Officer and Managing Director succeeding Campbell Wilson.

== Corporate affairs and identity ==
=== Business trends ===
The key trends of Air India are (as of the financial year ending 31 March):

Year	Revenue (₹Cr)	Net profit (₹Cr)	Number of passengers (mn)	Passenger load factor (%)	Freight carried (000 tonnes)	Fleet size	Reference
2015–16	20,610	−3,836	18.0	75.6	192	135	
2016–17	22,177	−6,281	19.1	76.3	196	136	
2017–18	23,003	−5,337	21.1	80.0	204	158	
2018–19	26,487	−8,556	22.1	79.0	240	171	
2019–20	28,524	−7,982	22.5	79.8	221	127	
2020–21	12,104	−7,083	6.3	68.4	74.9	124	
2021–22	19,815	−9,591	11.5	73.5	169	165	
2022–23	31,377	−11,388	18.5	81.9	175	127	
2023–24	38,812	−4,444	39.49			137	
2024–25	78,636		45.8				

=== Headquarters ===
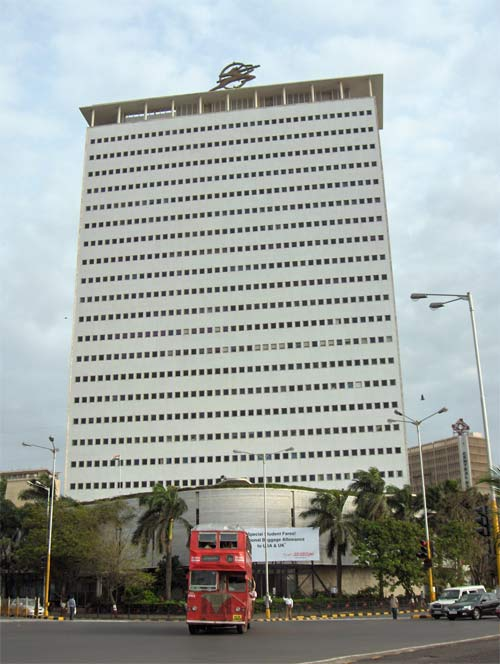
Air India Building in Mumbai served as Air India's headquarters until 2013

The Maharajah, Air India's mascot

Air India logo between 2007–2023

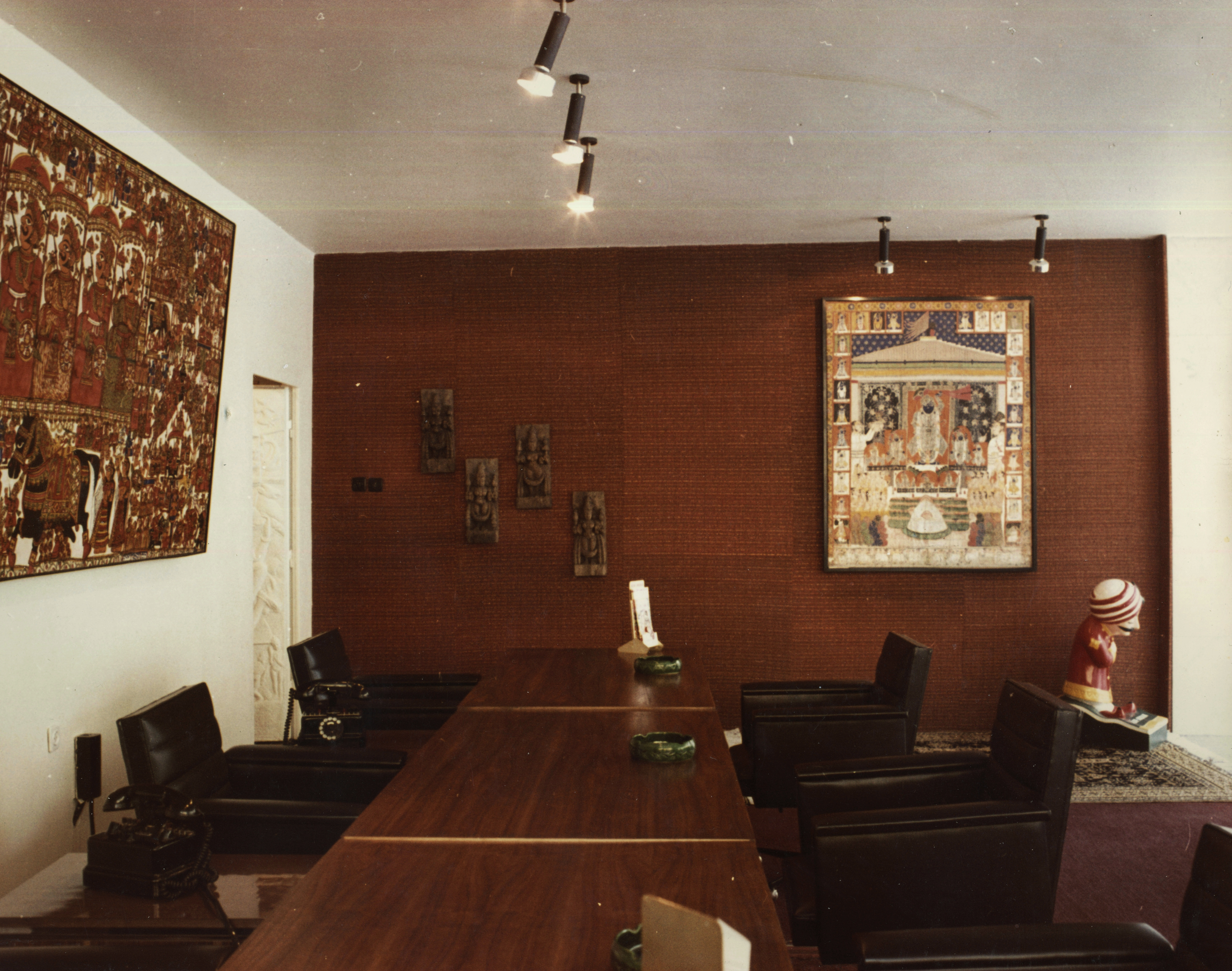
Some artworks exhibited at the Air India office in Budapest (Hungary) in 1970.

Air India Limited is headquartered in Gurgaon, Haryana, in Sector 16. Its head office is in 180,000 square feet (17,000 m^{2}) of leased space on the ground floor and floors 1–6 in Block 5 in the Vatika One-on-One complex, and the lease began on 29 September 2023. Air India Express, since 2024, occupies space in the same complex.

Air India moved its headquarters from Air India Building, Mumbai to Delhi in 2013. The former Mumbai headquarters is a 23-story tower on Marine Drive and was one of the targets of the 1993 Bombay bombings. It then occupied Indian Airlines House, New Delhi. In 2023, Air India moved its headquarters to Gurgaon in the National Capital Region.

=== Subsidiaries ===
==== Current ====
Air India Express began operations on 29 April 2005. It was initially owned by Air India Charters and mainly operated flights from South India to the Middle East and Southeast Asia in its early days. In November 2022, Air India acquired AirAsia's stake in AirAsia India, renamed it into AIX Connect and announced plans to merge it with Air India Express. On 1 October 2024, this merger was completed successfully.

==== Defunct ====
Air India became the first Asian airline to operate freighters when Air India Cargo was set up in 1954 and started its freighter operations with a Douglas DC-3 aircraft. Air India Cargo ended freighter aircraft operations in early 2012.

Alliance Air was a wholly owned subsidiary of Indian Airlines established on 1 April 1996. It started operations on 21 June 1996. It was renamed Air India Regional after the merger between Air India and Indian Airlines. It was renamed back to Alliance Air in 2017 and ceased being a subsidiary of Air India in April 2022 when the Government of India sold Air India to the Tata Group.

=== Mascot ===
Air India's mascot is the Maharajah (high king). It was created by Bobby Kooka, the then-commercial director of Air India, and Umesh Rao, an artist with J. Walter Thompson Limited in 1946. Kooka stated that, "We call him a Maharajah for want of a better description. But his blood isn't blue. He may look like royalty, but he isn't royal". Air India adopted the Maharajah as its mascot in 1946. It was used in promoting it although initially designed only for the airline's memo-pads. The Maharajah was given a makeover in 2015 and the brand is represented by a younger version. In 2023, the Maharajah was given a further makeover and was revealed that the mascot would only be used in certain aspects of the airline like the premium lounges and crockery.

=== Logo and livery ===
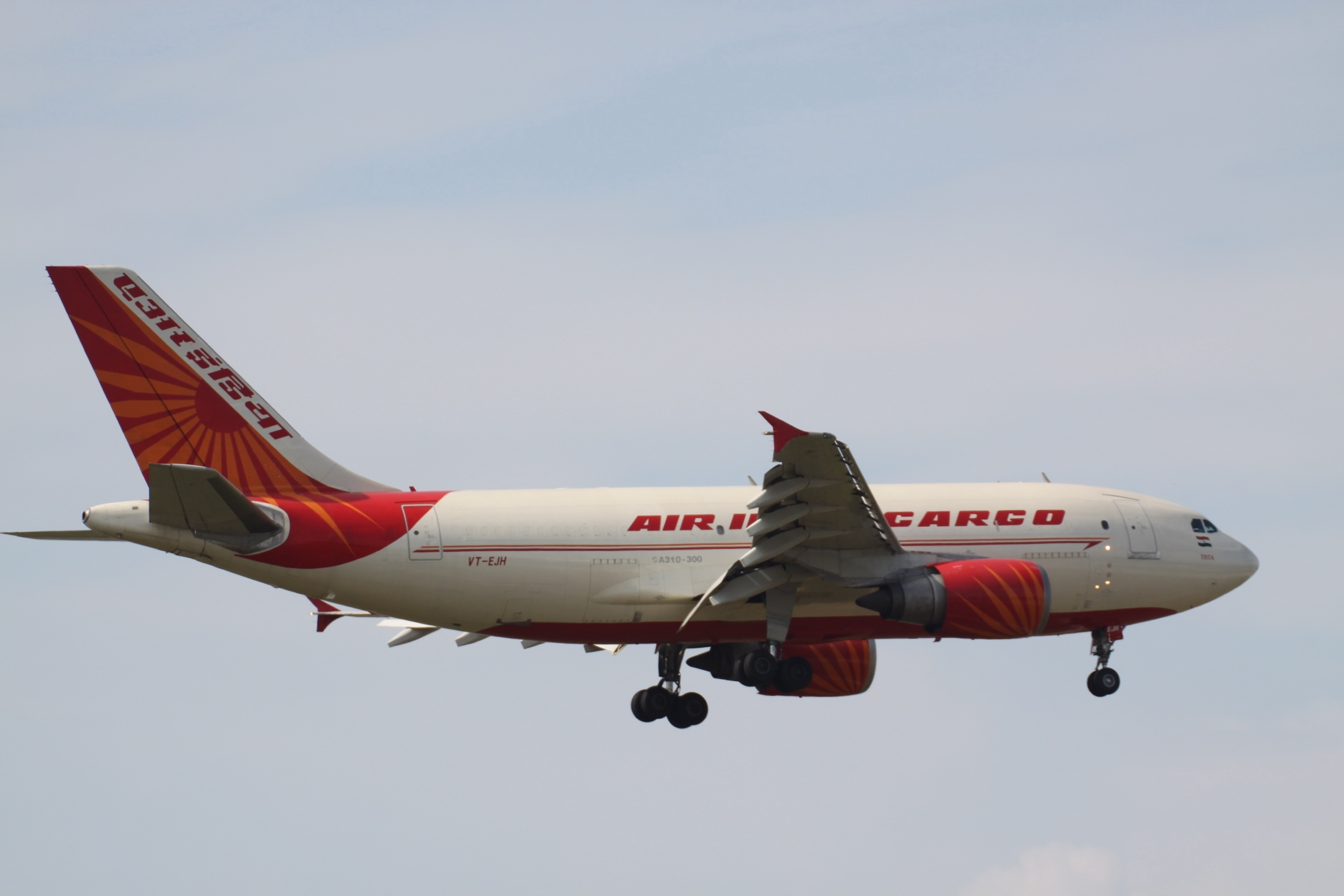
Airbus A310 part of the now defunct Air India Cargo.

Air India's colour scheme is red and white. The aircraft was painted white with red palace-style carvings on the outside of the windows and the airline's name written in red. The name is written in Hindi on the port side fuselage and in English on the port side tail. On the starboard side, the name is written in English on the fuselage and in Hindi on the tail. The window scheme was designed in line with the slogan Your Palace in the Sky. The aircraft was earlier named after Indian kings and landmarks. In 1989, to supplement its Flying Palace livery, Air India introduced a new livery that included a metallic gold spinning wheel on a deep red-coloured tail and a Boeing 747, Rajendra Chola, was the first aircraft to be painted in the new colours.

The first logo of Air India was a centaur, a stylised version of Sagittarius shooting an arrow in a circle representing the wheel of Konark. The logo chosen by founder J. R. D. Tata was introduced in 1948 and represented the airline until 2007. On 22 May 2007, Air India and Indian Airlines unveiled their new livery consisting of a Flying Swan with the wheel of Konark placed inside it. The flying swan was morphed from the centaur logo, and the chakra was derived from Indian's erstwhile logo. On 15 May 2007, Air India refreshed its livery, making the Rajasthani arches along the windows slightly smaller, extending a stylised line from the tail of the aircraft to the nose and painting the underbelly red. The new logo features on the tail and the engine covers with red and orange lines running parallel to each other from the front door to the rear door.

After the airline's acquisition by the Tata Group, the airline revealed its brand new logo and livery on 10 August 2023. The new livery features a palette of deep red, aubergine, and gold with chakra pattern and the new logo is inspired by the airline's Jharokha window pattern. In December 2023, the airline unveiled new uniforms for its crew and rolled out its new identity with an Airbus A350-900, the first aircraft to be re-branded.

=== Art collection ===
Air India maintained a collection of Indian art from 1956 comprising works of important Indian artists and photographers, sculptures, wood carvings, glass paintings, rare textiles etc. The artworks were often sent to be hung in Air India booking offices around the world and used in promotional material. In 1967, the company commissioned ashtrays from Salvador Dalí and gifted an elephant calf as payment. In 2010, a plan to establish a museum from the collection was stalled and the artworks reside in a building in Nariman Point, Mumbai. Air India organised the first ever exhibition of these art at the National Gallery of Modern Art in Delhi, titled Air India Salutes Indian Masters in 2013. Following a memorandum of understanding agreed between the airline and the Ministry of Culture, the art collection was transferred to the National Gallery of Modern Art (NGMA) in Mumbai in January 2023. The art was put up for exhibition titled Maharaja's Treasure: Select Works of Art from the Famed Air India Collection.

== Destinations ==
As of November 2025, Air India flies to a total of 87 destinations, including 42 domestic destinations and 45 international destinations in 37 countries across five continents around the world. Its primary hub is located at Indira Gandhi International Airport, New Delhi, and it has secondary hubs at Kempegowda International Airport, Bengaluru and Chhatrapati Shivaji Maharaj International Airport, Mumbai. Air India operates some of the world's longest non-stop flights.

=== Alliance ===
Air India joined the Star Alliance in 2014. Pictured is Air India Boeing 777-300ER in special Star Alliance livery.

Air India is a member of Star Alliance, having become the 27th member of the alliance on 11 July 2014.

=== Codeshare agreements ===
Air India has codeshare agreements with the following airlines:

- Air Astana
- airBaltic
- Air Canada
- Air India Express (Subsidiary)
- Air Mauritius
- Air New Zealand
- All Nippon Airways
- Asiana Airlines
- Austrian Airlines
- Avianca
- Croatia Airlines
- Egyptair
- Ethiopian Airlines
- EVA Air
- Icelandair
- Kenya Airways
- LOT Polish Airlines
- Lufthansa
- Saudi Arabian Airlines
- Singapore Airlines
- SriLankan Airlines
- Swiss International Air Lines
- TAP Air Portugal
- Uzbekistan Airways
- Virgin Australia

=== Interline agreements ===
Air India has interline agreements with the following airlines:

- Alaska Airlines
- Bangkok Airways
- Uganda Airlines

== Fleet ==
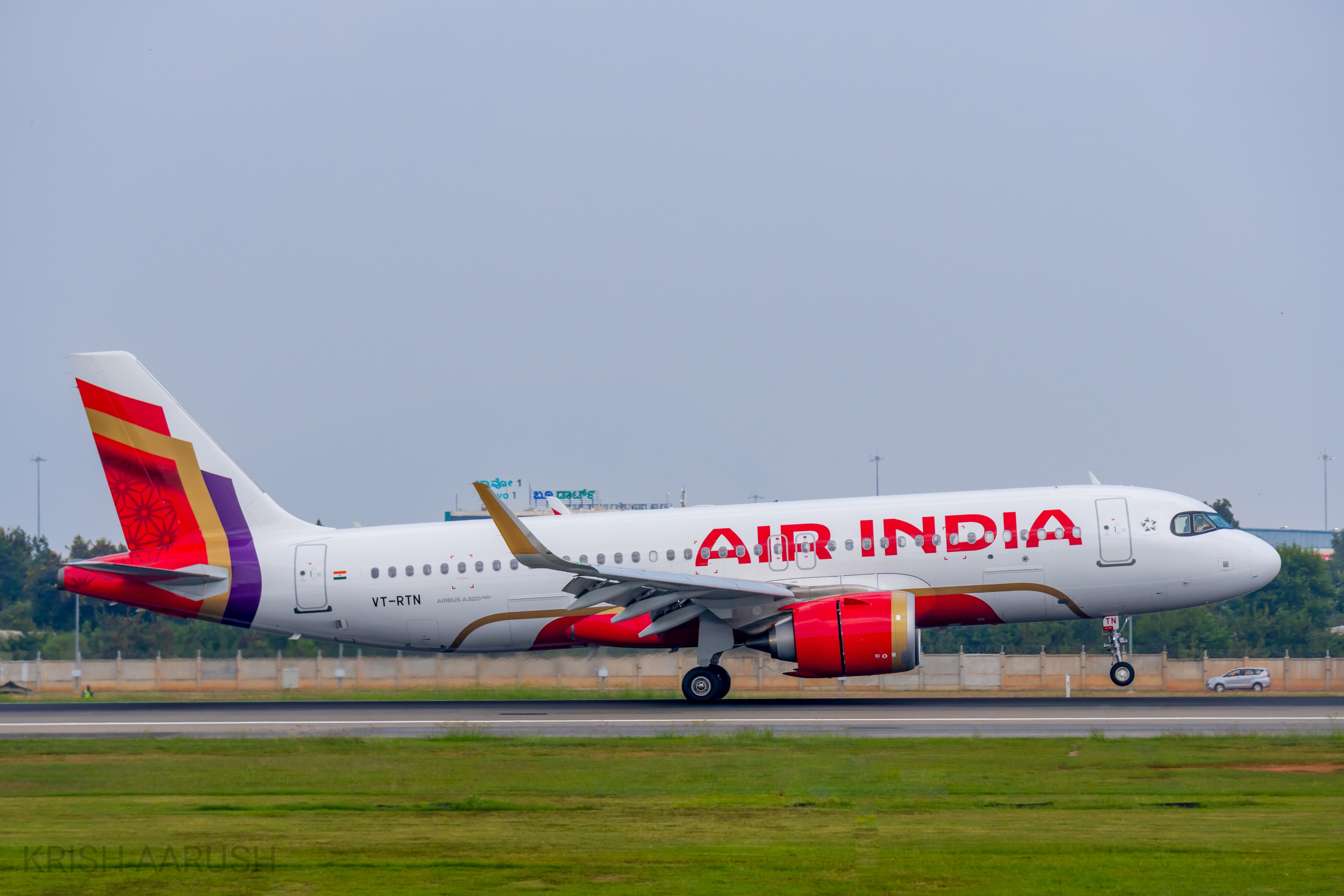
Air India Airbus A320neo

Air India Airbus A350-900

Air India Boeing 777-300ER

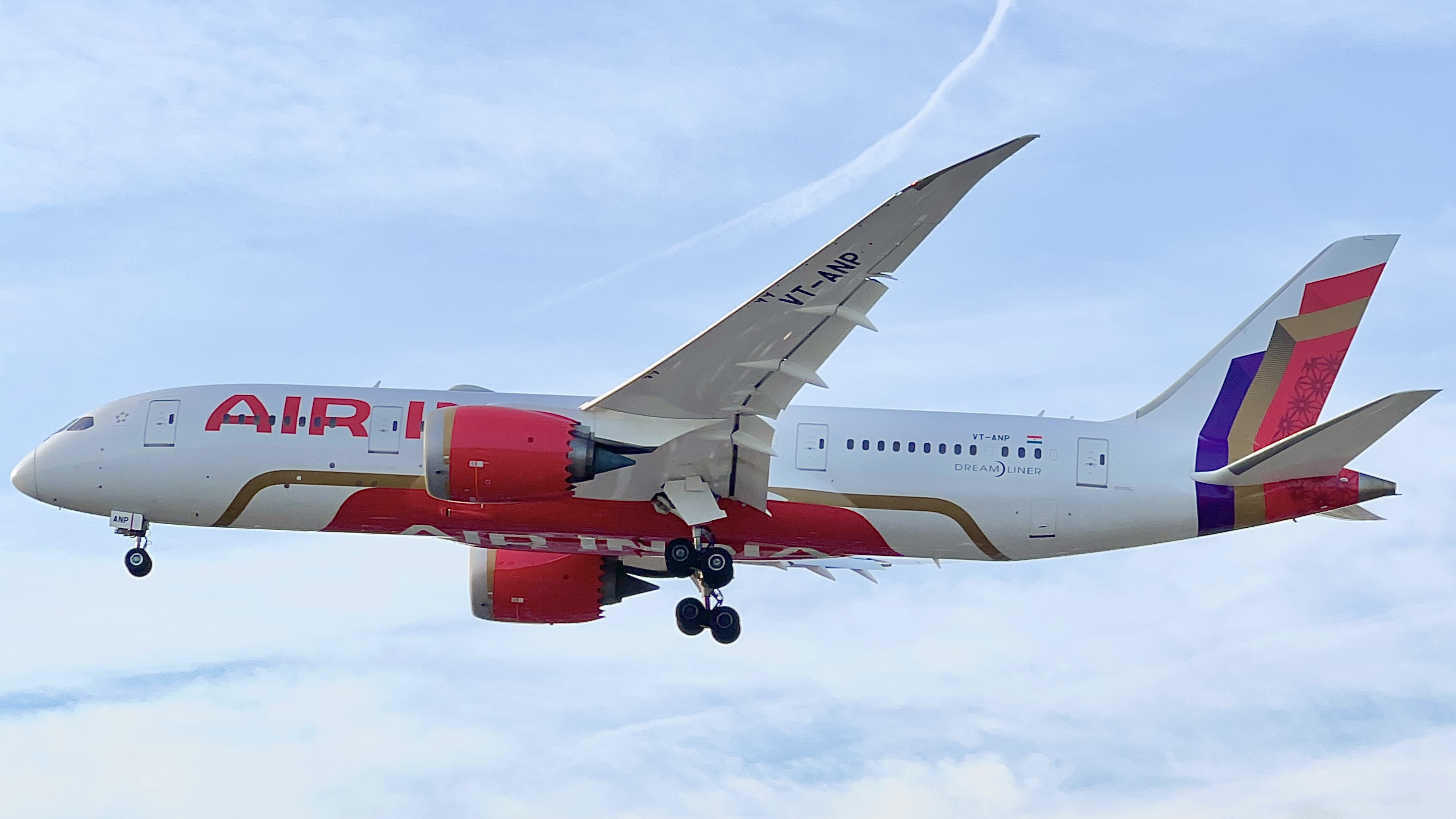
Air India Boeing 787-8 Dreamliner

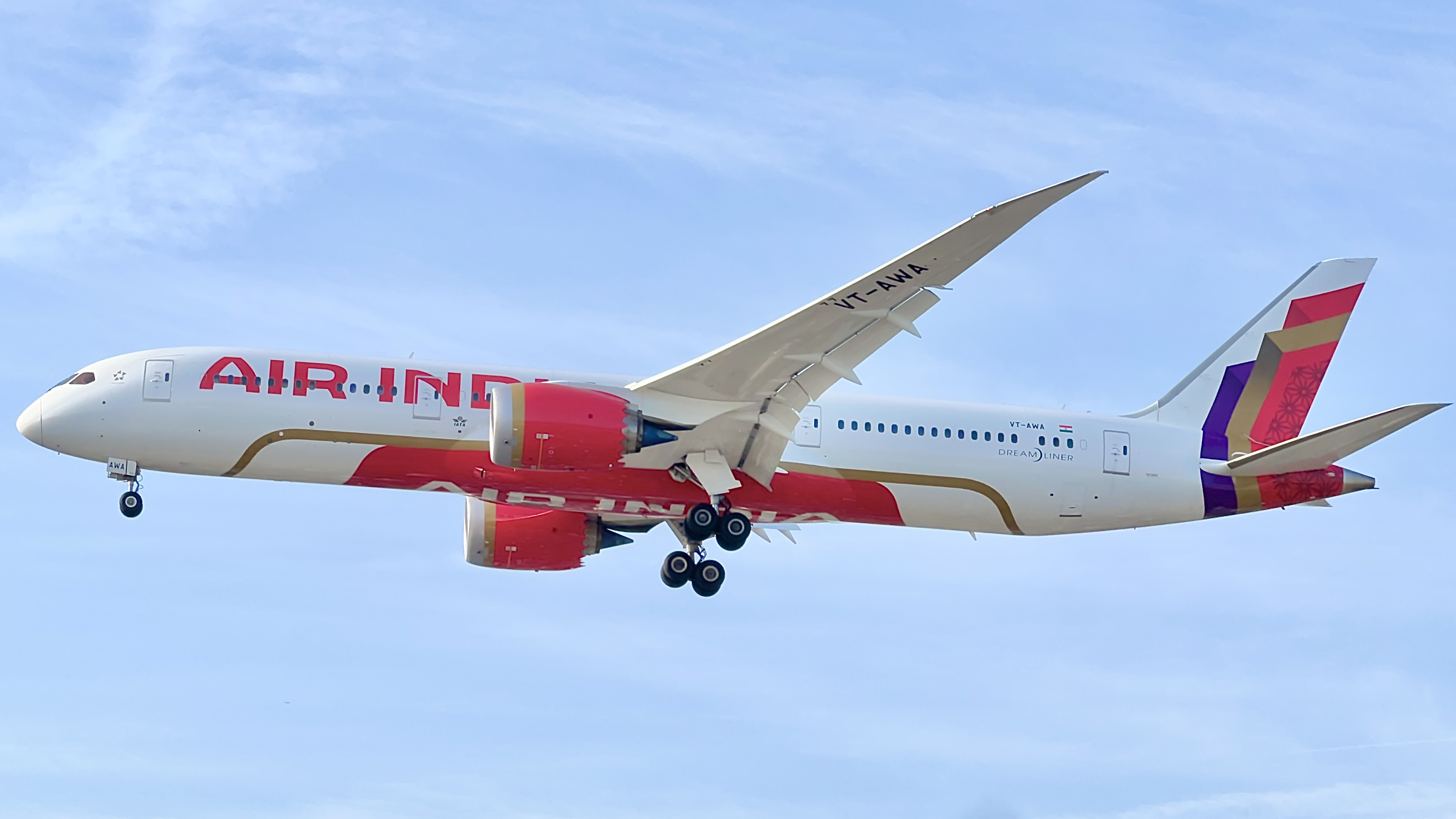
Air India Boeing 787-9 Dreamliner

As of November 2025, Air India operates a fleet of 189 aircraft, both narrowbody and widebody aircraft with a fleet composed of Airbus A319, A320, A320neo, A321, A321neo, A350 as well as the Boeing 777 and Boeing 787.

=== Fleet information ===
In 1932, Air India started operations with a De Havilland Puss Moth. On 21 February 1960, Air India International inducted its first Boeing 707-420C named Gauri Shankar (registered VT-DJJ), thereby becoming the first Asian airline to induct a jet aircraft in its fleet. In 1971, the airline took delivery of its first Boeing 747-237B named Emperor Ashoka (registered VT-EBD) In 1986, Air India took delivery of its first Airbus A310-300. On 4 August 1993, Air India took the delivery of its first Boeing 747-400 named Konark (registered VT-ESM) In 1989, Indian Airlines introduced the Airbus A320-200 aircraft, which Air India now uses to operate both domestic and international short haul flights. In 2005, Indian Airlines introduced the smaller A319, which is now used mainly on domestic and regional routes. After the merger in 2007, Air India inducted the A321 to operate mainly on international short-haul routes and leased Airbus A330s to operate on medium-long-haul international routes. The airline's first Boeing 777-200LR aircraft was delivered on 26 July 2007, which was named Andhra Pradesh. Air India received its first Boeing 777-300ER aircraft on 9 October 2007 and the aircraft was named as Bihar. Air India received its first Boeing 787 dreamliner aircraft on 6 September 2012 and commenced flights on 19 September 2012.

Air India One is the call sign of any Air India aircraft carrying the prime minister, president or the vice-president. Though the call-sign of Air India is used, these flights are operated on customised Boeing 777-300ER aircraft owned by Indian Air Force and maintained by Air India on a special contract.

=== Fleet restructuring ===
As a part of the financial restructuring, Air India sold five of its eight Boeing 777-200LR aircraft to Etihad Airways in December 2013. According to the airline, plans for introducing ultra-long flights with service to Seattle, San Francisco and Los Angeles were cancelled due to factors like high fuel prices and weak demand. In April 2014, the airline decided to sell its remaining three Boeing 777-200LRs as well, citing higher operating costs. On 24 April 2014, Air India issued a tender for leasing 14 Airbus A320 aircraft for up to six years, to strengthen its domestic network. On 11 April 2024, Air India sold four of its last remaining Boeing 747-400 jumbo jets US company AerSale. Air India is also planning to establish a dedicated subsidiary for cargo operations with dedicated freighters.

=== New aircraft orders ===
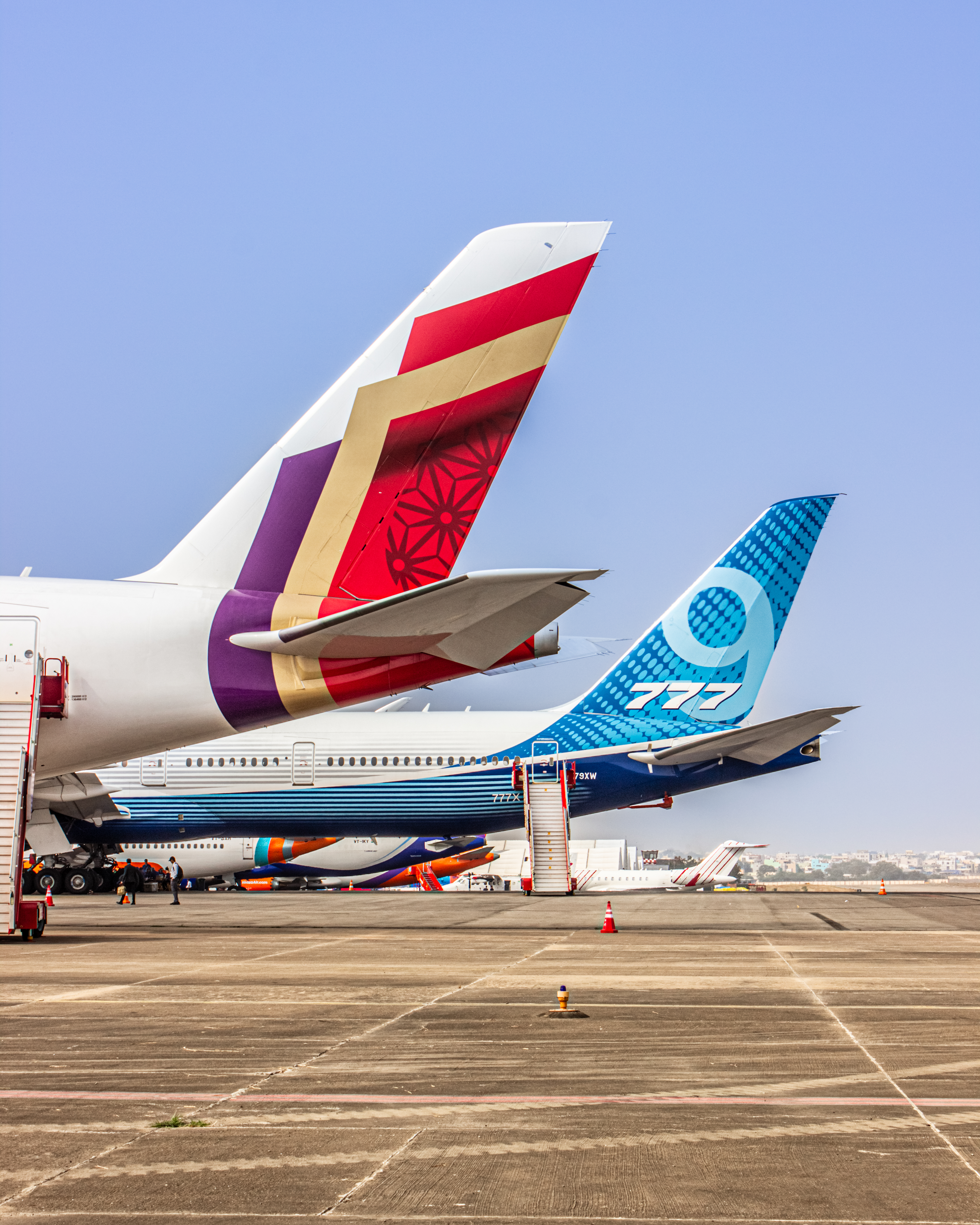
Air India's first A350 alongside its future companion, the Boeing 777X that the airline has ordered in early 2023 during the Paris Air Show.

On 11 January 2006, Air India announced an order for 68 jets – 8 Boeing 777-200LR, 15 Boeing 777-300ER, 18 Boeing 737-800 and 27 Boeing 787-8 Dreamliners. The 18 Boeing 737s ordered were later transferred to Air India Express.

On 14 February 2023, Air India announced an order for 470 aircraft with Airbus and Boeing consisting of 210 Airbus A320neos, 40 Airbus A350s, 190 Boeing 737 MAXs, 20 Boeing 787-9s, and 10 Boeing 777-9s for US$70 billion with deliveries beginning late 2023.

On 10 December 2024, an additional order of 100 aircraft with Airbus converting previous options was confirmed consisting of 90 Airbus A320neos and 10 Airbus A350s.

On 29 January 2026, an additional order of 30 aircraft out of its 50 options was made for its subsidiary, Air India Express consisting of 20 Boeing 737 MAX 8 and 10 Boeing 737 MAX 10 aircraft and also 15 orders of existing Airbus A321neo was converted into Airbus A321XLR.

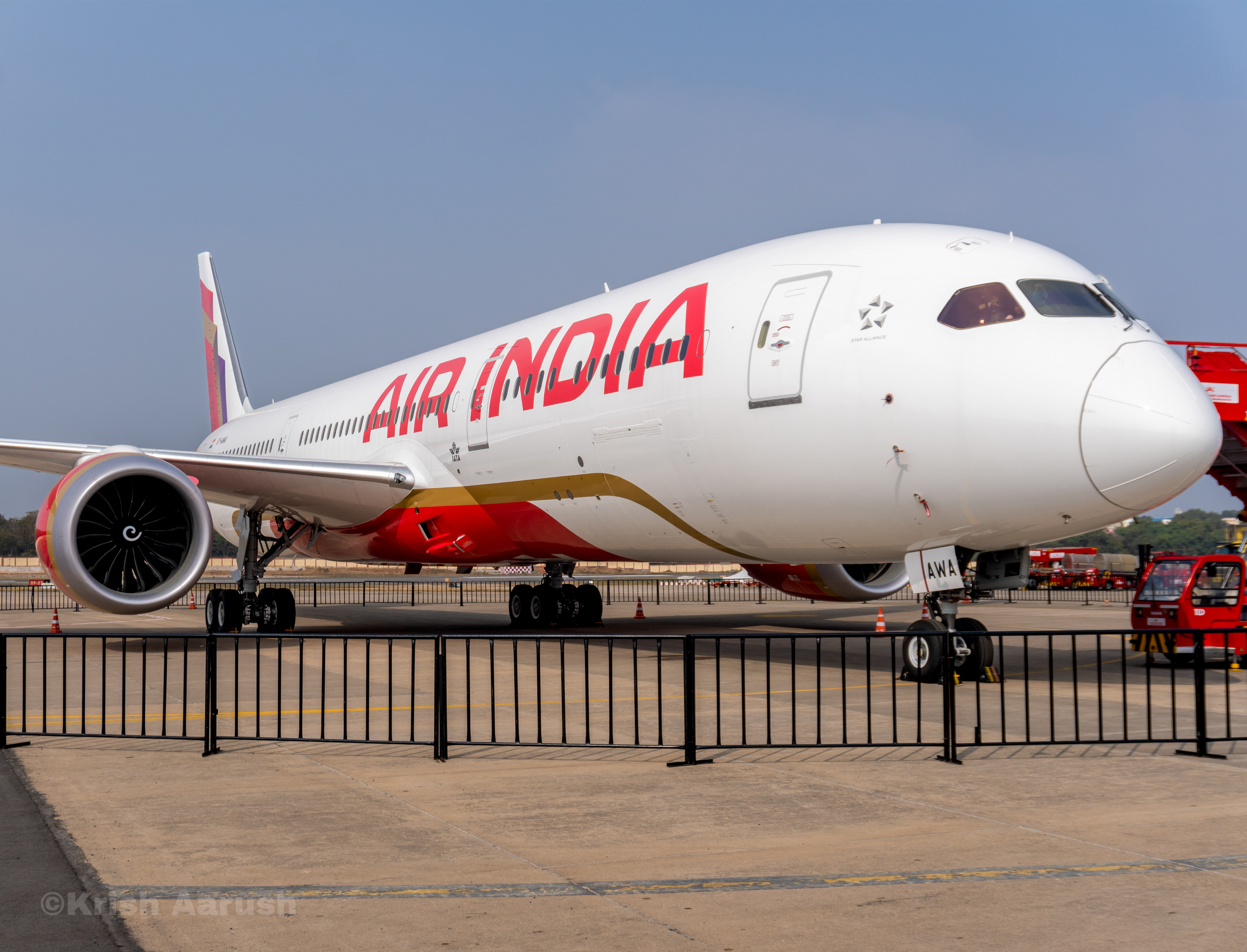
Air India Boeing 787-9 Dreamliner

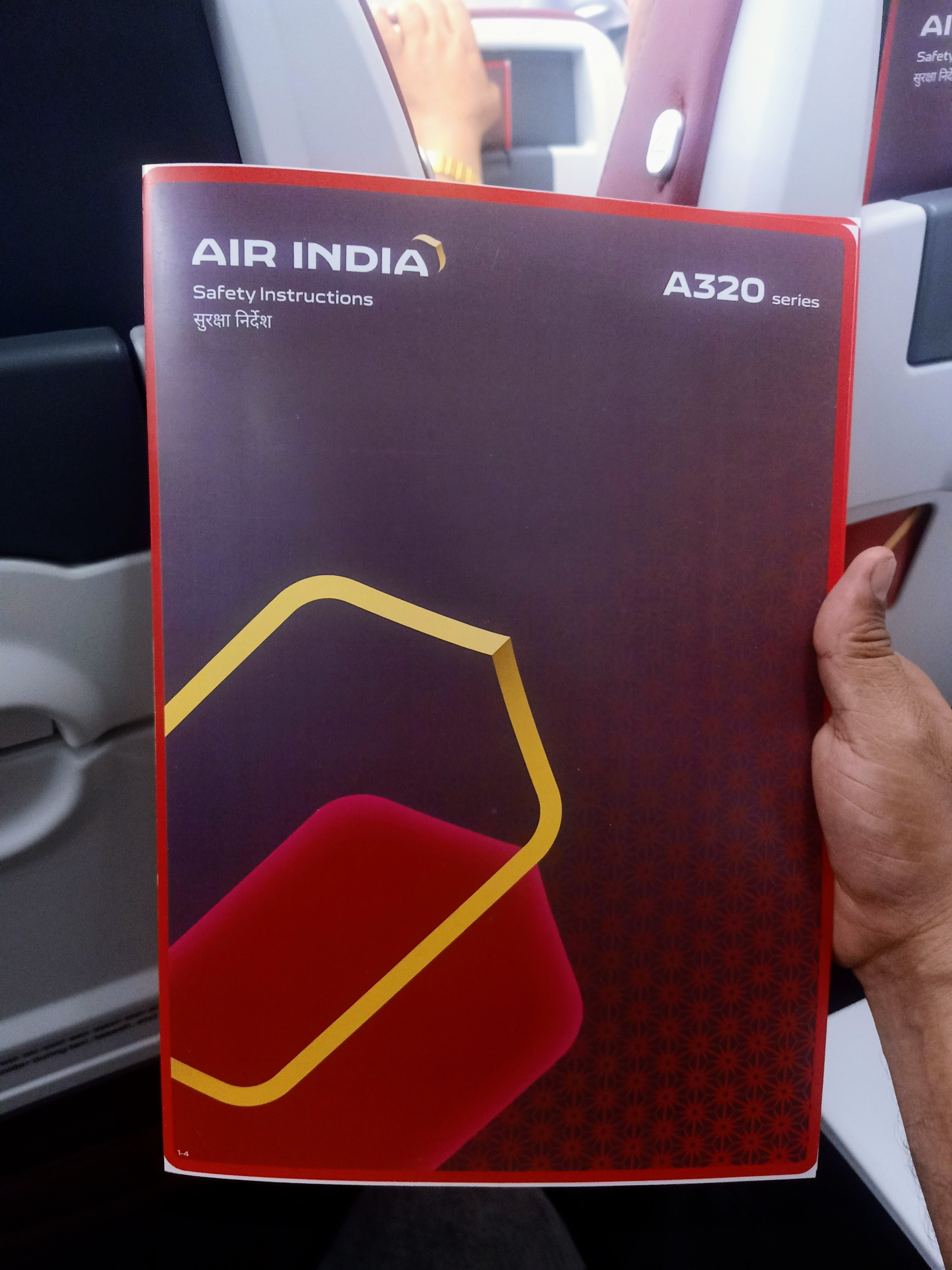
New Airbus A320 safety instruction booklet

== Services ==
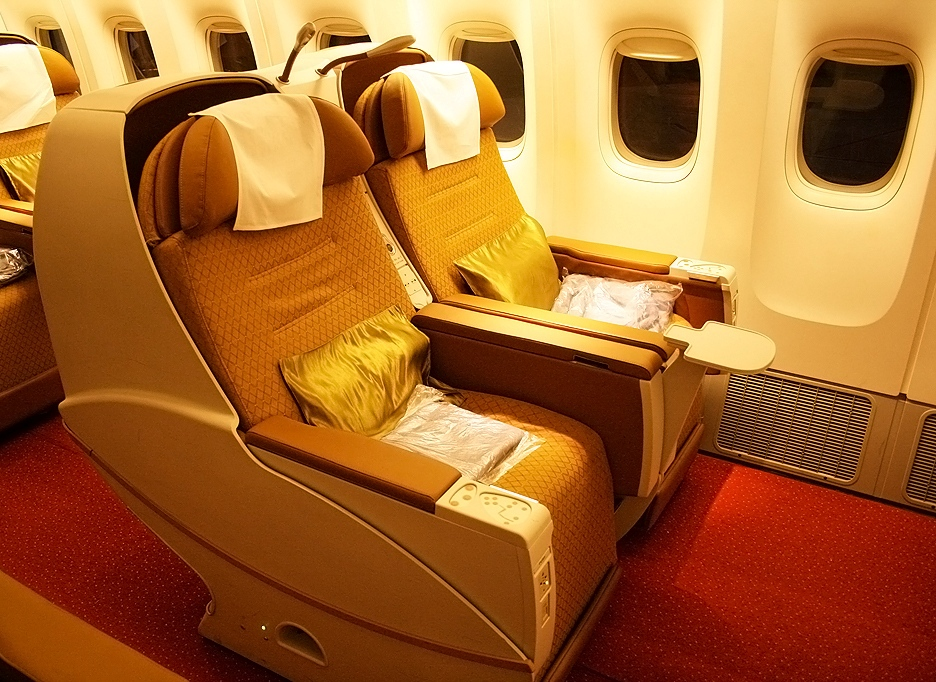
Business Class seats on board the Boeing 777-200LR/777-300ER

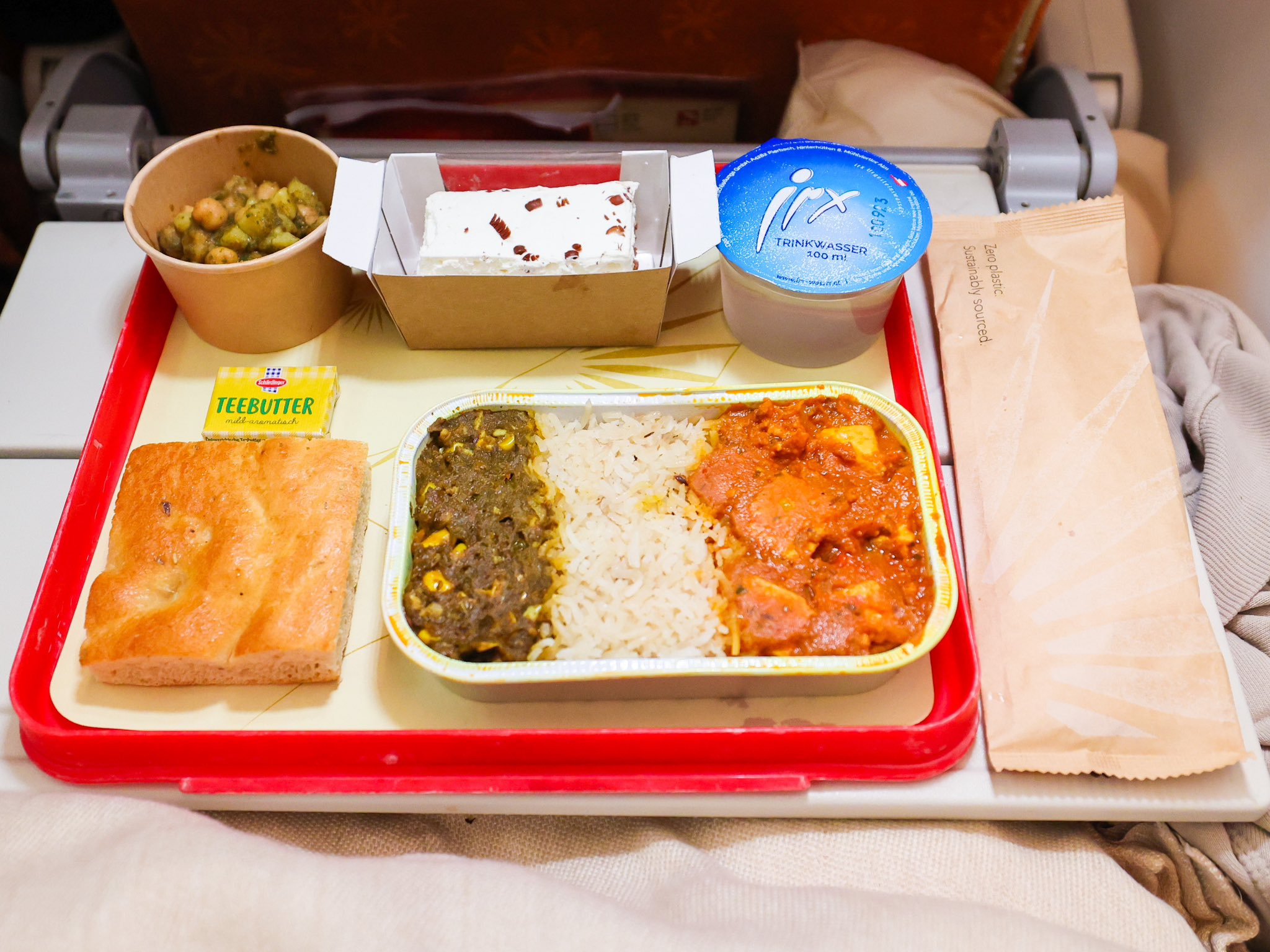
Air India economy class in-flight meal

=== Cabin ===
The Boeing 777-300ERs that have operated with Air India since before its privatisation have a three-class configuration with first, business, and economy class. These include the carrier's older, 2-3-2 business class cabins and 3-3-3 economy class cabins. Air India also operates ex-Etihad 777-300ERs which feature a different product compared to their legacy 777-300ERs, albeit also in a three-class configuration(First Class, Business Class, and Economy).

Air India's Boeing 787-8 Dreamliners have a similar product to its older 777s but do not have first class, opting for a two-class configuration with a 2-2-2 business class and economy class. These aircraft are gradually being retrofitted with new interiors in a three-class configuration(Business class, Premium Economy, and Economy).

Air India's A350-900 aircraft have a three-class configuration with business, premium economy, and economy class.

Within its A319/320/321ceo fleet, which primarily serves domestic and regional international services, only business and economy class are offered, while its A320/321neo aircraft have either a three-class configuration with business, premium economy, and economy class, or an all-economy configuration.

In November 2024, the merger between Air India and Vistara was completed, and former Vistara aircraft started operating under Air India. The 787-9 Dreamliners which Air India inherited from this merger are configured in a three-class layout.

Air India's took delivery of its first factory-fit 787-9 Dreamliner in January 2026, which is configured in a three-class layout(Business Class, Premium Economy, and Economy).

=== In-flight entertainment ===
Air India's widebody fleet is equipped with seatback on-demand in-flight entertainment systems on which passengers can choose from available content. This varies from the Thales i5000 on the 777-300ER, the Thales i8000 on the 787-8s, to the Panasonic eX3 on the A350-900 and 787-9. The legacy 777 and 787 product are being replaced with Thales' Avant Up system. Thales will also line-fit further deliveries of the A350-900 and the 787-9 with the same system. Air India does not offer seatback entertainment on its narrowbody fleet, with the exception of the A321LR, which uses Panasonic's eX1 system. On its other narrowbodies, and as an interim solution on its legacy widebody fleet, Air India uses the Bluebox streaming IFE service. Namaste.ai is the current in-flight magazine published in English by Air India. It replaced Shubh Yatra (meaning Happy Journey), which was a bilingual in-flight magazine published in English and Hindi.

=== On-Board Wi-fi ===
On 1 January 2025, Air India announced that it rolled out free onboard WiFi on all flights operated by the carrier's A350, Boeing 787-9 and select A321neo aircraft. Other planes would get Wi-Fi connectivity after they go through a refurbishment. The carrier became the first airline in the nation to offer such complimentary service within India. In April 2026, Air India selected Hughes Network Systems to transform its in-flight connectivity. The airline is also the global launch customer for a common connectivity platform that will be deployed across its widebody fleet, including the Airbus A350-1000, Boeing 787-8, and Boeing 777-300ER. For the A350 fleet, Air India will utilise the Airbus HBCplus programme, while the Boeing aircraft will be retrofitted with RAVE Aerospace Ka-band terminals.

=== Frequent flyer programme ===
Flying Returns was Air India's frequent-flyer programme. It was India's first frequent flyer programme and was shared by Air India and its subsidiaries. A member could earn mileage points and redeem them during future travel. On higher fares, passengers would earn bonus miles and clock mileage points.

Following the merger of Air India and Vistara, Flying Returns and Club Vistara were combined and rebranded as Maharaja Club.

== Missions ==
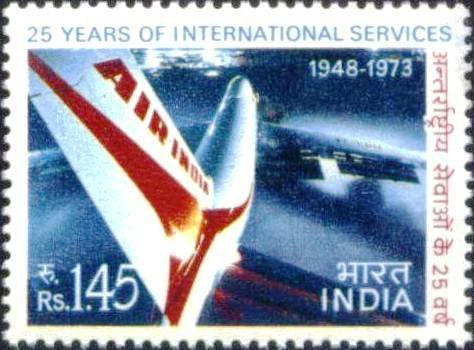
25th Anniversary of Air India's International Services postage stamp

As the flag carrier, Air India is often involved in the evacuation of civilians during wars. The airline entered the Guinness Book of World Records for the most people evacuated by a civil airliner. Over 111,000 people were evacuated from Amman to Mumbai, a distance of 4,117 kilometres (2,558 mi), by operating 488 flights from 13 August to 11 October 1990 – lasting 59 days. The operation was carried out during Persian Gulf War to evacuate Indian expatriates from Kuwait and Iraq. The event was later featured in the film Airlift.

In February–March 2011, Air India evacuated more than 15,000 Indian nationals during the Libyan civil war. In March–April 2015, the airline was involved in Operation Raahat during the Yemeni civil war. In August 2021, Air India evacuated 669 people under Operation Devi Shakti from war-torn Afghanistan during the 2021 Taliban offensive. In February 2022, Air India evacuated Indian citizens from Russia and Ukraine as a part of Operation Ganga during the Russo-Ukrainian War. In October 2023, the airline evacuated people from Israel during the Gaza war as a part of Operation Ajay.

== Awards and recognitions ==
- Preferred International Airline for travel and hospitality from Awaz Consumer Awards (2006)
- Best Corporate Social Responsibility Initiative by Galileo Express Travel World
- Best Short-Haul International Airline by Galileo Express Travel World (2008)
- Corporate Excellence Award by Amity University (2006)
- Trusted Brand by Reader's Digest (2006)
- Dun and Bradstreet Award (D&B), first in terms of revenue out of the top airline companies out of India (2006)
- Best South Asian Airline, Mice and business travel publications (2006)
- Cargo Airline of the Year, 26th Cargo Airline of the Year Awards
- Montreal Protocol Public Awareness Award by the United Nations for environmental protection
- Air India was named India's most trusted airline by The Brand Trust Report 2015.

Air India's ground services became the first ground service provider to acquire ISO 9002 certification on 31 January 2001.

== Accidents and incidents ==
As of November 2025, Air India has been involved in eleven fatal crashes and twenty ground fatalities, two of which were caused by acts of terrorism.

=== Fatal ===
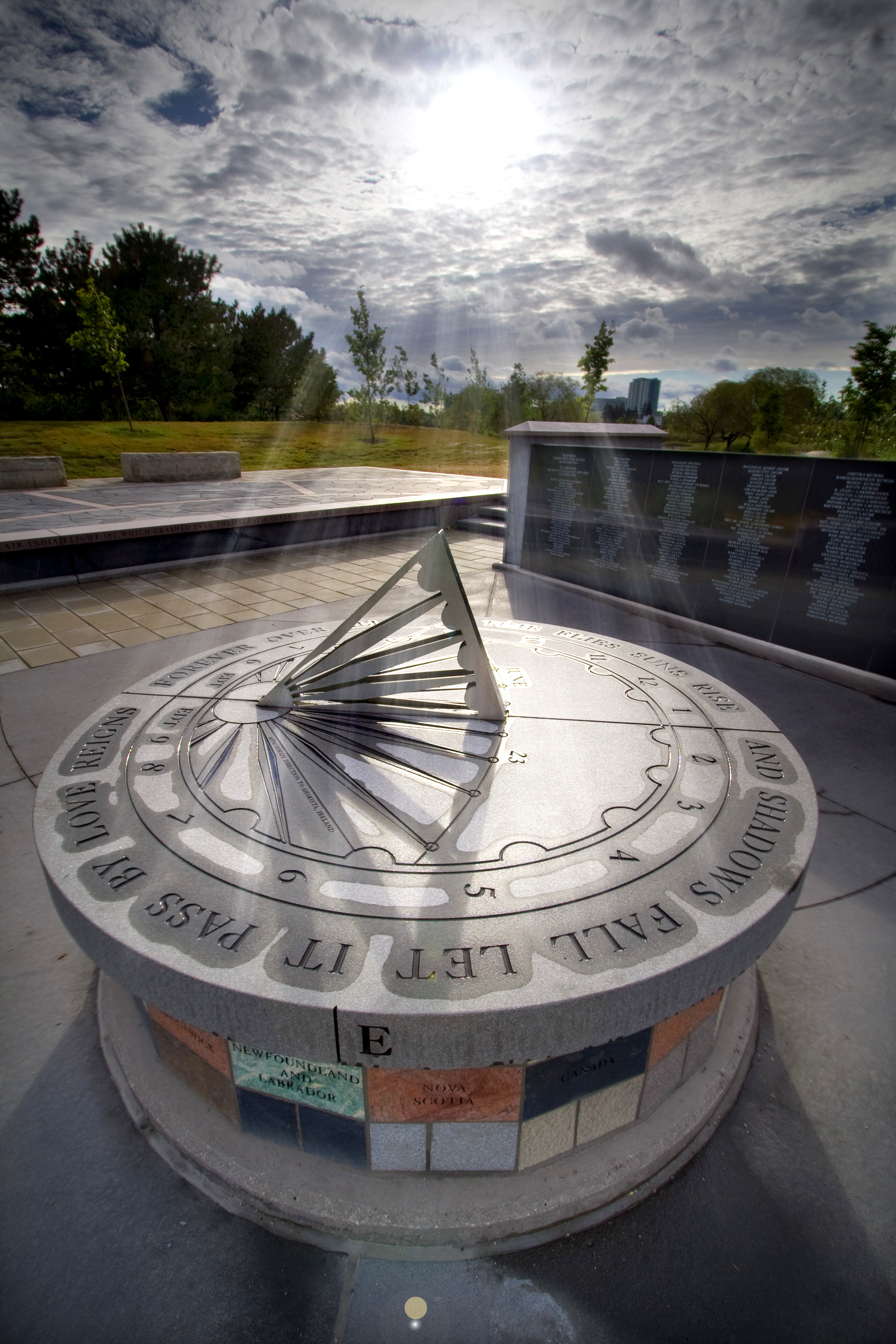
The Air India Memorial in Toronto, Ontario, Canada dedicated to the victims of Air India Flight 182

- On 27 December 1947, a Douglas C-48C (registered VT-AUG) carrying nineteen passengers and four crew en route from Karachi to Bombay, crashed at Korangi Creek due to loss of control following instrument failure, killing all on board. This was the airline's first fatal accident. The aircraft had been notorious for electrical problems and had an unusual number of instrument replacements.
- On 3 November 1950, Air India Flight 245, a Lockheed L-749 Constellation (registered VT-CQP, Malabar Princess) carrying forty passengers and eight crew on a flight from Bombay to London via Cairo and Geneva, crashed on Mont Blanc in France, killing all 48 on board.
- On 13 December 1950, a Douglas C-47B (registered VT-CFK) carrying 17 passengers and four crew from Bombay to Coimbatore, crashed into high ground near Kotagiri due to a navigational error, killing all on board.
- On 15 September 1951, a Douglas C-47A (registered VT-CCA) lost control and crashed on takeoff from HAL Bangalore Airport with the autopilot turned on, killing a crew member; all 23 passengers survived.
- On 9 May 1953, a Douglas C-47A (registered VT-AUD) crashed shortly after takeoff from Palam Airport following a loss of control due to pilot error, killing all thirteen passengers and five crew on board.
- On 11 April 1955, Air India Flight 300, (Kashmir Princess) Lockheed L-749A Constellation (registered VT-DEP) flying from Hong Kong to Jakarta, crashed while attempting a water landing post a mid-air bomb explosion in the right main landing gear bay, killing all eleven passengers and five out of eight crew.
- On 24 January 1966, Air India Flight 101 Kanchenjunga, a Boeing 707-420 (registered VT-DMN) carrying 117 people (106 passengers and 11 crew) crashed on Mont Blanc, France killing all 117 on board including Indian scientist Homi J. Bhabha. The cause of crash was controlled flight into the terrain, which was attributed to a navigational miscalculation by the pilots while descending towards Geneva Airport.
- On 1 January 1978, Air India Flight 855 Emperor Ashoka, a Boeing 747-237B (registered VT-EBD) crashed into the Arabian Sea post taking off from Bombay, killing all 190 passengers and 23 crew on board. The cause of the crash was crew disorientation while dealing with a malfunctioning AI in the dark as the flight took off during the night time.
- On 21 June 1982, Air India Flight 403 Gouri Shankar, a Boeing 707-420C (registered VT-DJJ) carrying 99 passengers and 12 crew from Kuala Lumpur to Bombay via Madras crashed while landing at Sahar airport during a rainstorm. The fuselage broke apart, and seventeen people, including two crew members were killed. The cause of the crash was undershooting the runway due to flight crew error and miscalculation.
- On 23 June 1985, Air India Flight 182, a Boeing 747-237B (registered VT-EFO nicknamed Kanishka), was blown up in mid-air by a suitcase-bomb planted by Babbar Khalsa terrorists on the first leg of its Montreal–London–Delhi–Bombay flight. The aircraft exploded off the coast of County Cork, Ireland in the Atlantic Ocean, killing all 307 passengers and 22 crew on board.
- On 17 December 2015, an Air India technician was killed in a freak accident at Chhatrapati Shivaji Maharaj International Airport in Mumbai after being sucked into the engine of an Airbus A319 during pushback when the co-pilot mistook a signal and started the engine.
- On 12 June 2025, Air India Flight 171, a Boeing 787-8 Dreamliner (registered VT-ANB) flying from Ahmedabad Airport to Gatwick Airport, crashed into the hostel building of B. J. Medical College shortly after takeoff. All but one of the 242 people on board were killed, as well as 19 people on the ground. A preliminary report found that two fuel control switches were moved from their RUN to CUTOFF positions, causing both engines to immediately start losing thrust seconds after take-off.

=== Non-fatal ===
- On 19 July 1959, Rani of Aera, a Lockheed L-1049G Super Constellation (registered VT-DIN) carrying 46 people (39 passengers and seven crew) crashed on approach to Santacruz airport, Bombay in poor visibility conditions due to rain. There were no fatalities but the aircraft suffered damage beyond repair and was written off.
- On 23 January 1971, during a training flight for practice at Santacruz Airport in Bombay(now Mumbai), an Air India Boeing 707-437 (registered VT-DJI), went off the runway to the right while performing a 3-engined takeoff, and no. 3 and 4 engines struck a mound 9 feet high located 188 feet from the edge of the runway and were torn off. The wing structure broke off progressively inward and an intense fire broke out. There were no casualties among the 5 crew members, but the 11 year old Boeing 707 was damaged beyond repair and written off.
- On 29 August 1978, Air India Flight 123, a Boeing 747-237B (registered VT-EBO), flying from Delhi to Frankfurt and carrying 377 passengers and crew, aborted take-off at 150 knots due to No. 3 engine failure. While the crew hit the brakes and deployed thrust reversers, the plane veered off the runway and entered soft ground, resulting in left-hand wing landing gear collapse and substantial damage, as No. 3 and 4 reversers were not effective. The No. 3 engine failed due to ingestion of tire pieces. The plane sustained substantial damage but was repaired and put back into service.
- On 28 January 1983, Air India Flight 306 Emperor Kanishka, a Boeing 747-200B (registered VT-EFO), collided with an Indian Airlines Airbus A300 after landing at Palam Airport, Delhi, with the plane suffering substantial damage. The plane was repaired and put back into service, but it was lost to the bombing of Flight 182.
- On 7 May 1990, Air India Flight 132 Emperor Vikramaditya, a Boeing 747-200B (registered VT-EBO) flying on the London–Delhi–Bombay route carrying 215 people (195 passengers and 20 crew) caught fire on touch down at Delhi airport due to a failure of an engine pylon-to-wing attachment. There were no fatalities, but the aircraft was damaged beyond repair and written off.
- On 30 July 2005, Air India Flight 127, a Boeing 747-400 (registered as VT-EVJ) on lease from Korean Air, flying from HAL Airport in Bengaluru to Chicago with stops at Mumbai and Frankfurt, skidded while landing at Mumbai on the wet runway 14/32 due to hydroplaning, and damaged the nose wheel landing gear after hitting a few runway lights. While there were no injuries, the plane, which was immobilised after being stuck at the end of runway 32, sustained substantial damage and was taken to an Air India hangar for repairs. The incident took place four days after the airport was closed due to flooding in the Mumbai, and two days after reopening. An alternative Boeing 747-400 was arranged to continue the next legs of the flight, which took off after a delay of four hours.
- On 4 September 2009, during the pre-takeoff phase at Chhatrapati Shivaji Maharaj International Airport in Mumbai, Air India Flight 829, a Boeing 747-400 (registered as VT-ESM), experienced an engine fire, which spread to the wing. As the damage caused by the fire was substantial by spreading to the wings and engine pylon, the plane was declared a total loss and 21 of the 229 individuals on board were injured while evacuating. The Boeing 747 was scrapped for parts in May 2011. This particular 747 was the first 747-400 to enter Air India's fleet.
- On 4 August 2026, Air India Flight 2379, an Airbus A320 operating from Phuket to New Delhi experienced a sudden altitude loss during cruise, reportedly following turbulence. The aircraft lost around 300 feet of altitude during which 17 people (including 13 passengers and four crew members) sustained injuries ranging from minor to serious. The aircraft continued the flight and landed safely in Delhi with passengers given immediate medical attention. The incident as of 10 August 2026 has been classified as a 'serious incident' and is currently under investigation by India's Aircraft Accident Investigation Bureau.

== See also ==
- List of airlines of India
- List of airports in India
- Transport in India
