= Air India Express =

Indian low-cost airline

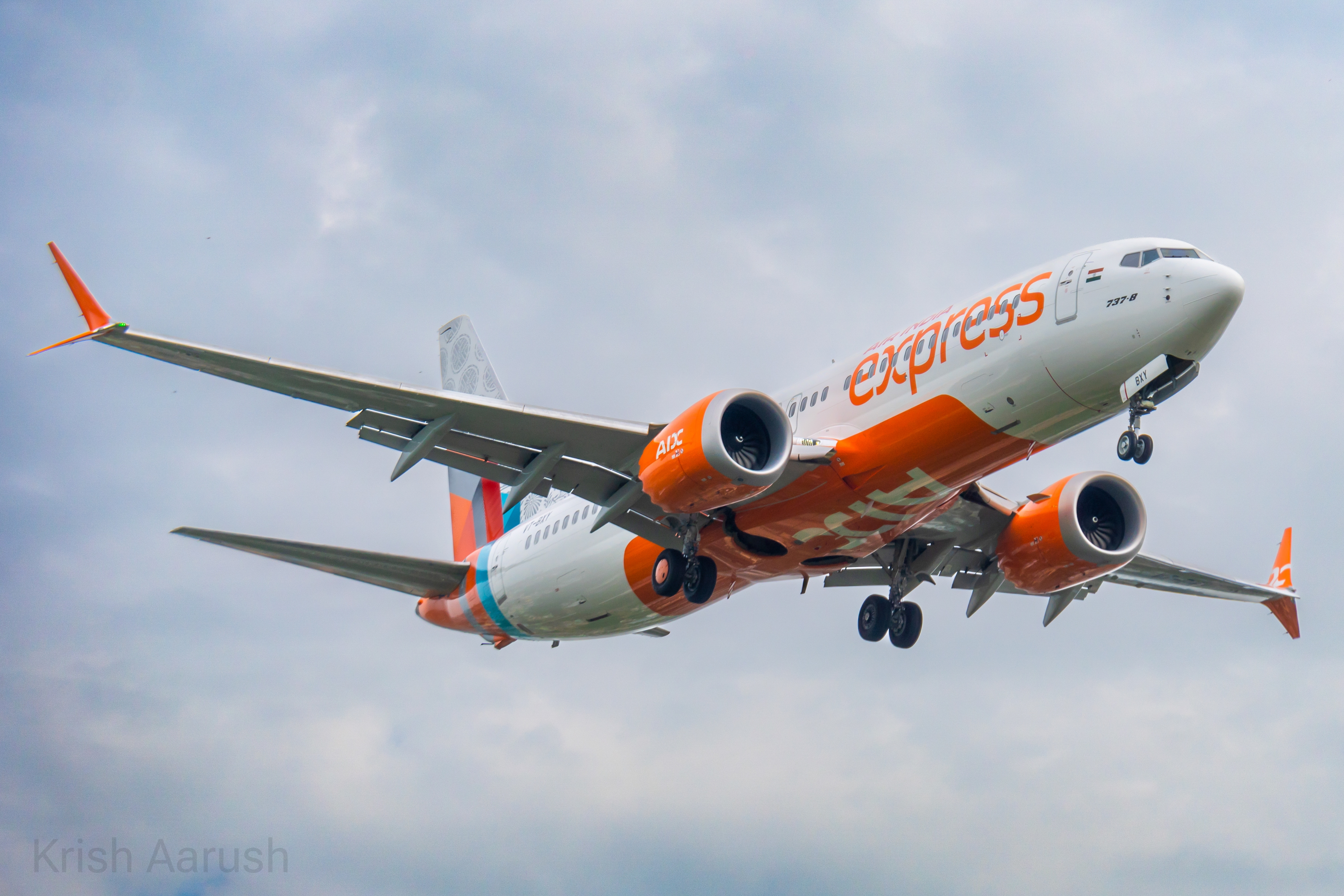
- Air India Express Boeing 737 MAX 8
IATA	ICAO	Call sign
IX	AXB	EXPRESS INDIA
- Founded: March 2005; 21 years ago
- Commenced operations: 29 April 2005; 21 years ago
- Hubs: Bengaluru; Delhi; Mumbai
- Frequent-flyer program: Tata NeuPass
- Fleet size: 110
- Destinations: 62
- Parent company: Air India Limited
- Headquarters: Gurugram, Haryana, India
- Key people: Nipun Aggarwal (Chairman)
- Revenue: ▲₹160.33 billion (US$1.7 billion) (FY2025)
- Net income: ▼₹−56.78 billion (US$−610 million) (FY2025)
- Employees: 8,000 (as of July 2025)
- Website: airindiaexpress.com

Air India Express is an Indian low-cost airline owned by Air India Limited. It is headquartered in Gurugram, Haryana. As of January 2026, the airline operates more than 500 flights per day to 45 domestic and 17 international destinations, with its primary hubs at Bengaluru, Delhi, and Mumbai.

== History ==
Air India Express was launched as a subsidiary of Air India on 29 April 2005. The airline was launched as a low-cost carrier focused on routes across South Asia, Southeast Asia and the Gulf region. As a low-cost carrier, the airline operated point-to-point flights with multiple hubs all over India. Initially headquartered in Delhi, it was relocated to Kochi in 2013. While its parent entity Air India ran into operational losses in the 2010s, the airline continued to remain profitable. However, the airline operated with a fixed fleet of 24 aircraft for years, with no plans for expansion or modernisation.

On 8 October 2021, Tata Sons acquired Air India along with Air India Express and fifty percent of AISATS, a ground handling company, in a deal valued at ₹180 billion (equivalent to ₹220 billion or US$2.4 billion in 2026). Following the completion of the acquisition on 27 January 2022, the company became a part of Air India Limited. In 2023, the Tata Group sought to consolidate its holdings in various airline companies. It resulted in the group acquiring full control of AirAsia India, which was rebranded as AIX Connect, and proposed to be merged with Air India Express post the approval by authorities. In March 2023, the Tata Group announced the integration of both the airlines.

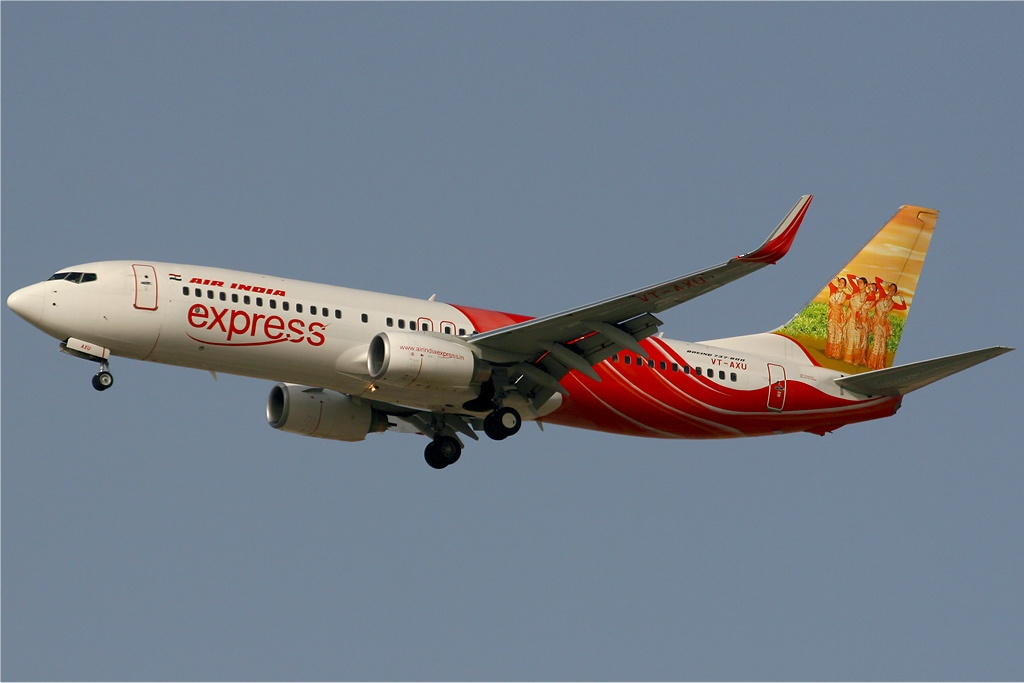
Air India Express Boeing 737-800 in the former livery

Post the acquisition and merger, the services operated by Air India Express were optimised to focus on low cost routes and complement the Air India network. On 18 October 2023, the airline was rebranded with a new logo and livery. In late 2023, the company moved its headquarters to Gurugram. The merger of AIX Connect and Air India Express was declared complete on 1 October 2024. At the time, the airline had a fleet of 88 aircraft and planned to increase it to 110 aircraft by the end of the year. In 2025, the airline unveiled a new cabin interior, and a new uniform for its cabin crew. The new cabin layout would be applied to the entire fleet of Boeing 737 MAX 8 aircraft and the Airbus A320 family aircraft that were transferred from Air India and AIX Connect, with the retrofit expected to be completed by mid 2026.

== Corporate affairs and identity ==
Air India Express is headquartered at the Vatika One-on-One complex in Gurugram, which also houses the head office of Air India.

=== Livery ===
Logo used until 2023

In the earlier branding, the aircraft featured a predominantly white color scheme with the brand name written in red in English on one side and Hindi on the other side, and a stylised red wavy design on the aft fuselage. Each aircraft featured a unique tail art, with each side of the tail painted with various designs related to India. The new livery introduced in October 2023, features the airline's updated logo and a color palette dominated by Express Orange and Express Turquoise, with the tail art reflecting traditional art patterns found in Indian textiles and indigenous art.

=== Business trends ===
* In FY2024, Air India Express Limited (standalone) reported ₹7,537 crore revenue and a ₹163.1 crore net loss, excluding AIX Connect (formerly AirAsia India). Following their merger in October 2023, the combined airline carried 40.7 million passengers with an 85% load factor. Consolidated financials for the merged entity will begin from FY2025.

Financial year	Revenue (₹ crore)	Net Profit (₹ crore)	Passengers (million)	Load factor (%)	Reference
2015	2,622	−61	2.62	81.4	
2016	2,917	361	2.80	82.1	
2017	3,335	296	3.42	83.3	
2018	3,648	262	4.30	85.2	
2019	4,172	169	4.36	84.7	
2020	5,219	412	4.88	87.7	
2021	2,039	98.2	1.14	74.6	
2022	3,522	−72.3	2.01	77.5	
2023	5,669	116	4.35	83.4	
2024*	7,537	−163.1	6.71	81.3	
2025	16,033	−5,678.17	NA	NA	
2026	19,088	−6,767	NA	NA	

== Destinations ==
Air India Express focuses on routes dominated by low cost carriers and which have a higher component of leisure customers. As of January 2026, the airline flies to 45 domestic destinations and 17 international destinations with primary hubs located in Bengaluru, Delhi, and Mumbai. It flies to international destinations mainly in the Middle East and Southeast Asia.

Air India Express has codeshare agreements and interline agreements with Air India, Scoot and Singapore Airlines.

== Fleet ==
As of October 2026, Air India Express operates the following aircraft:

Air India Express fleet
Aircraft	In service	Orders	Passengers	Notes
Airbus A320-200	9	—	180	Older aircraft to be phased out
Airbus A320neo	20	—	186	≤4 to be transferred from Air India
Airbus A321neo	4	—	192	
Boeing 737-800	24	—	189	Older aircraft to be phased out
Boeing 737 MAX 8	53	167	≤189	Order with 20 options
Boeing 737 MAX 10	—	167	TBA	Order with 20 options
Total	110	167		

=== Fleet information ===
During the 2023 Paris Air Show, Air India placed an order with Boeing for 220 aircraft, which included 190 737 MAX aircraft. The order was later transferred to Air India Express with deliveries commencing from September 2023. Subsequently, Air India Express revealed its plan to have a fleet of 170 aircraft within the next five years. The airline accepted deliveries of MAX 8 aircraft that were originally manufactured for a different airline. On 29 December 2025, the airline received its first MAX aircraft fitted specifically for the airline with an all-economy seating, and the 51st overall. It was assigned the aircraft registration VT-RNT in the honour of Ratan Tata.

== Services ==
Air India Express operates as a low cost carrier, and features an all economy class seating in most of the aircraft. In 2025, the airline unveiled a new cabin with all economy class seats in a 3-3 seat configuration. The leather seats manufactured by Collins Aerospace, were fitted with armrests, tray tables, lighting and charging ports. It offers different fares on the same service, including hand baggage only fares. The airline does not offer inflight meals as a standard, and offers heated meals on demand.

== Accidents and incidents ==
- On 22 May 2010, Air India Express Flight 812, a Boeing 737–800 (registered as VT-AXV) flying in from Dubai overshot the runway on landing at Mangalore, killing 152 passengers and six crew members of the 166 people on board. The aircraft crashed into a wooded valley at the end of the runway and burst into flames. There were only eight survivors.
- On 7 August 2020, Air India Express Flight 1344, a Boeing 737–800 (registered as VT-AXH), suffered a runway excursion on landing at Kozhikode. The aircraft fell into a valley after overrunning the table-top runway at the airport, killing 21 people on board including both pilots, and 76 sustained serious injuries (75 passengers and one cabin crew member). The remaining 93 suffered minor injuries or no injuries.

== See also ==
- Air India Cargo
- Air Kerala
- Alliance Air (India)
