= External commercial borrowing =

Foreign currency loans from non-resident Indians to Indians

External commercial borrowing (ECBs) are loans in India made by non-resident lenders in foreign currency to Indian borrowers. They are used widely in India to facilitate access to foreign money by Indian corporations and PSUs (public sector undertakings). ECBs include commercial bank, buyers' credit, suppliers' credit, securitised instruments such as floating rate notes and fixed rate bonds etc., credit from official export credit agencies and commercial borrowings from the private sector window of multilateral financial Institutions such as International Finance Corporation (Washington), ADB, AFIC, CDC, etc. ECBs cannot be used for investment in stock market or speculation in real estate. The DEA (Department of Economic Affairs), Ministry of Finance, Government of India along with Reserve Bank of India, monitors and regulates ECB guidelines and policies.

Most of these loans are provided by foreign commercial banks and other institutions. During the 2012, contribution of ECBs was between 20 and 35 percent of the total capital flows into India. Large number of Indian corporate and PSUs have used the ECBs as sources of investment.

For infrastructure and greenfield projects, funding up to 50% (through ECB) is allowed. According to a report in The Hindu in January 2013, the Reserve Bank of India raised the ECB limit "for non-banking finance companies (NBFCs) classified as infrastructure finance companies (IFCs) ... from 50 per cent to 75 per cent of owned funds, including outstanding ECBs". In telecom sector too, up to 50% funding through ECBs is allowed. Recently Government of India allowed borrowings in Chinese currency yuan. Earlier, corporate sectors could mobilize $750 million via automatic route, whereas service sectors and NGO's for microfinance could mobilize $200 million and $10 million respectively. More recently, RBI issued a guideline stating that all eligible borrowers can raise ECB up to US$750 million or equivalent per financial year under the automatic route.

Borrowers can use 25 per cent of the ECB to repay rupee debt and the remaining 75 per cent should be used for new projects. A borrower can not refinance its entire existing rupee loan through ECB. The money raised through ECB is cheaper given near-zero interest rates in the US and Europe, Indian companies can repay part of their existing expensive loans from that.
