= AIX Connect =

Low-cost airline of India (2013–2024)

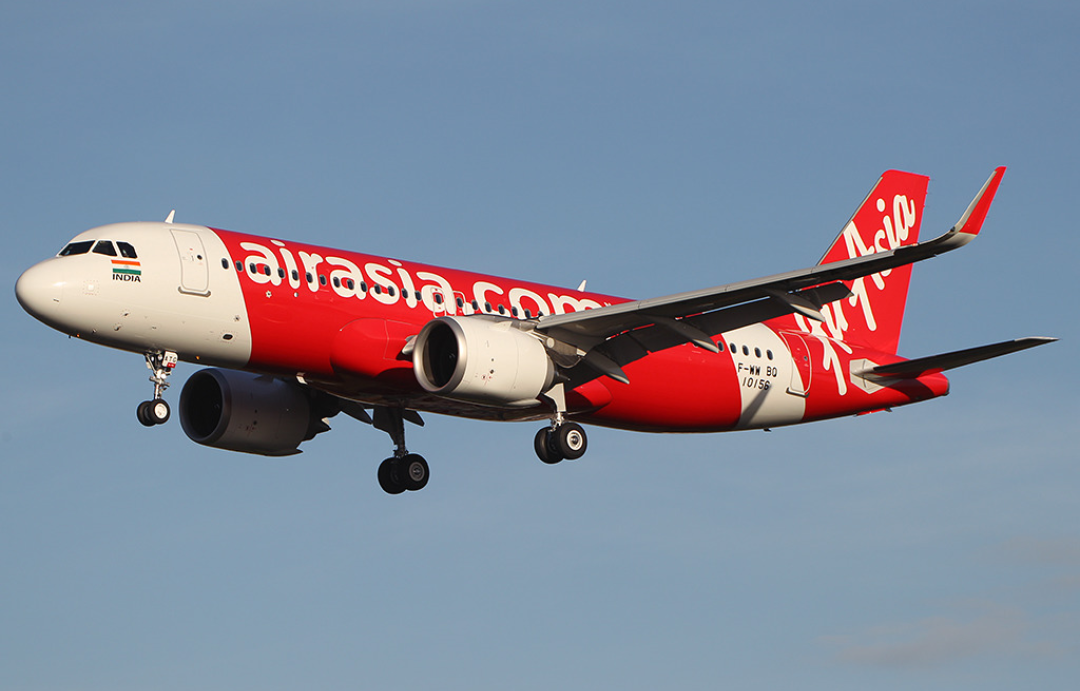
- AirAsia India Airbus A320neo
IATA	ICAO	Call sign
I5	IAD	RED KNIGHT
- Founded: 28 March 2013; 13 years ago (as AirAsia India)
- Commenced operations: 12 June 2014; 12 years ago
- Ceased operations: 1 October 2024; 2 years ago (merged into Air India Express)
- Operating bases: Bangalore; Delhi; Kolkata; Mumbai
- Frequent-flyer program: Tata NeuPass
- Fleet size: 23
- Destinations: 19
- Parent company: AirAsia (2013–2022); Air India Limited (2022–2024)
- Headquarters: Bangalore, Karnataka, India
- Key people: Campbell Wilson (Chairman); Aloke Singh (CEO)
- Revenue: ▲₹5,210 crore (US$540 million) (2024)
- Net income: ▼₹−1,149 crore (US$−120 million) (2024)
- Website: www.airasia.com (first) www.airindiaexpress.com (final)

AIX Connect, formerly known as AirAsia India, was an Indian low-cost airline headquartered in Bangalore (Bengaluru), Karnataka, and a wholly owned subsidiary of Air India Limited, which in turn is owned by the Tata Group. The airline was founded as a joint venture between Tata Sons and AirAsia Bhd and commenced operations in June 2014 with Bangalore as its primary operating base. From 2020 to 2022, AirAsia Bhd gradually disinvested its shares in the joint venture and sold them to Tata Sons. In December 2022, after the entire shares of AirAsia India was acquired by Tata Sons, the airline was renamed AIX Connect ahead of its merger with Air India Express.

The AirAsia India brand was retired on 31 October 2023, and the airline started operating flights for Air India Express. On 1 October 2024, AIX Connect was merged into Air India Express.

== History ==
In February 2013, with the Government of India allowing a foreign direct investment of up to 49% in airlines, AirAsia Berhad applied to the Indian Foreign Investment Promotion Board (FIPB) seeking approval to commence its operations in India. In March 2013, AirAsia announced that it would establish a joint venture with Tata Sons and Telestra Tradeplace with Tata Sons representing the airline with two non-executive directors on the board.

The airline planned to operate with the world's lowest unit cost of ₹1.25 (1.3¢ US) per available seat kilometre and a passenger break-even load factor of 52%. It also planned to hedge 100% of its fuel requirements for the first three years and to achieve an aircraft turnaround time of 25 minutes.

AirAsia planned to begin operations in various tier 2 and tier 3 cities with Chennai International Airport as its main operating base. According to KPMG, the introduction of AirAsia was expected to cause another price war, ultimately leading to an increase in air traffic and some consolidation in the Indian aviation sector. AirAsia initially invested an amount of US$50 million and in preparation for its operations in India, it struck deals with online and offline travel agents. On 3 March 2013, the FIPB officially permitted AirAsia to rent or lease aircraft and to carry cargo on its scheduled flights. The airline then applied for permission to schedule aircraft and transport passengers, which the FIPB accepted on 6 March.

AirAsia India was established on 28 March 2013 and became the first foreign airline to set up a subsidiary in India. In April, the airline started recruiting candidates for pilots and cabin crew. As the final procedure to obtain Air Operator Permit, a proving flight was conducted on 1 and 2 May 2014 flying from Chennai to Kochi, Bangalore and Kolkata. On 7 May 2014, the DGCA issued an Air Operator Permit to the company. On 30 May 2014, the airline announced the shifting of its base to Bangalore and its first flight from there to Goa. AirAsia operated its maiden flight on 12 June 2014. In June 2015, the airline made Indira Gandhi International Airport, Delhi its secondary hub for North Indian operations. In August 2015, Tata Sons increased its stake to 40.06% from 30% earlier by injecting fresh equity while Telestra's share was reduced to 10% from 20%. As of July 2019, AirAsia India was the fifth largest low-cost carrier in India, behind IndiGo, SpiceJet, Star Air (India), and GoAir, with a market share of 7.1%.

In January 2018, then-managing director and chief executive Amar Abrol announced plans for the company to expect a fleet of 21 aircraft by the year's end, making it eligible to operate overseas flights.

On 29 December 2020, AirAsia Berhad announced that it would sell a 32.67% stake in AirAsia India to Tata Sons for $37.7 million, including a provision to sell the remaining 16.33% stake for $18.8 million. Tata Sons acquired Air India Limited on 8 October 2021. The Tata Group requested approval from the Competition Commission of India (CCI) to merge AirAsia India with Air India Limited in April 2022, which was granted on 14 June 2022. On 2 November 2022, AirAsia Berhad sold the remaining 16.33% stake to Tata Sons. However, the AirAsia brand could still be used for twelve months.

AirAsia India added the gender-neutral honorific Mx as a third option for passengers booking tickets from June 2022.

On 19 May 2023, AIX Connect operated India's first commercial flight using indigenously produced sustainable aviation fuel from Pune to Delhi.

=== Name change and merger with Air India Express ===
In June 2022, the Competition Commission of India approved Air India's proposal to acquire the 16.33% stake of Malaysian partner AirAsia Berhad in AirAsia India. Subsequently, Air India signed agreements in November 2022 to acquire AirAsia India and announced its plans to merge the carrier with Air India Express. By an agreement with AirAsia Bhd, after its sale to the Tatas, the airline had to stop using the AirAsia branding by November 2023. Hence, the airline changed its name to AIX Connect in December 2022.

On 27 March 2023, Air India integrated the reservations system and customer interface of its two low-cost subsidiary airlines - Air India Express and AirAsia India, in a move to consolidate its airline entities. The process largely involved Air India Express migrating to the systems used by AirAsia India. Passengers were able to make and manage bookings, and check-in to AirAsia India and Air India Express domestic and international flights, on an all-new integrated website.

In July 2023, AIX Connect received regulatory approvals to operate its flights under the 'Air India Express' branding, effectively allowing the airline to operate, market, and distribute their flights as Air India Express. Air India entered into a codeshare pact with AIX Connect in September 2023, covering more than 100 flights a day on 21 routes.

The aircraft of AIX Connect were transferred to Air India Express Air Operator Certificate (AOC). In October 2023, VT-ATD, an Airbus A320neo became the first to transfer into the Air India Express fleet after completing the DGCA’s CAP3100 process.

On 1 October 2024, the merger of AIX Connect and Air India Express was declared to be complete.

== Corporate affairs ==
AirAsia India was headquartered in Bangalore, India. Prior to the airline's formation, Tony Fernandes, founder of AirAsia group, announced that he would like Ratan Tata to be the chairman of the airline; however the latter refused, though he later consented to be the chief advisor to the AirAsia India management board. On 15 May 2013, AirAsia India appointed management consultant Mittu Chandilya as CEO. A month later, on 17 June, S. Ramadorai, the non-executive vice-chairman of Tata Consultancy Services, was appointed as the chairman of the airline. In April 2016, Amar Abrol replaced Mittu Chandilya as the CEO of the airline. In June 2018, Amar Abrol reportedly quit and in October 2018, AirAsia India announced that Sunil Bhaskaran had been appointed managing director and CEO of the airline.

Former chairman of the Tata Group Cyrus Mistry alleged that there were corporate governance lapses between the two joint venture partners.

== Former fleet ==
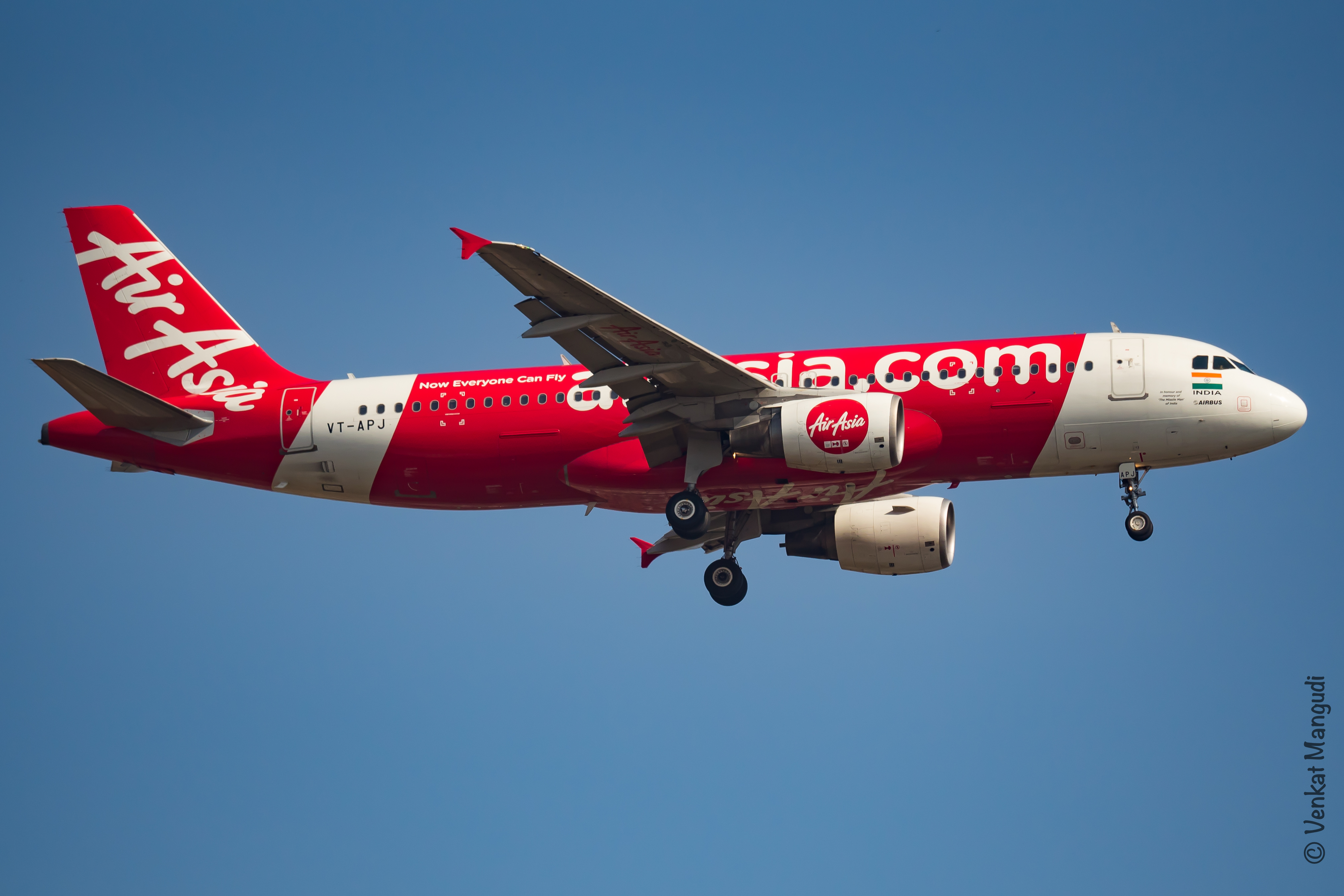
AirAsia India A320-200

AIX Connect (formerly known as AirAsia India) operated the following all-Airbus fleet:

AIX Connect fleet
Aircraft	Total	Introduced	Retired	Notes
Airbus A320-200	7	2014	2020-2021	To AirAsia group
Airbus A320-200	2	2014	2024	Back to lessor
Airbus A320-200	21	2014	2024	To Air India Express
Airbus A320neo	5	2020	2024	To Air India Express

== See also ==
- List of defunct airlines of India
