= Campbell Wilson =

New Zealand businessman

- Born: 1971 (age 54–55); Christchurch, New Zealand
- Education: Shirley Boys' High School, University of Canterbury
- Occupations: CEO and MD, Air India

Campbell Wilson is a New Zealand business executive who is a former chief executive officer and managing director of Air India, he served in this role from 25 July 2022 to 2026. Previously, he worked for the Singapore Airlines Group for more than 25 years, including two stints as CEO of the group's low-cost airline, Scoot.

== Singapore Airlines Group ==
Wilson joined Singapore Airlines in Auckland in 1996 and was appointed vice president of the airline's operation in Canada in 2006. Two years later, he was appointed general manager of Hong Kong, and then of Japan operations in 2010.

James joined Scoot as the airline's founding CEO in 2011 and was quoted as saying "my immediate task is to establish a strong management team and we will be actively recruiting to fill senior positions." On 1 November 2011, Wilson officially unveiled the new airline.

In June 2016, Wilson left Scoot. He was the senior vice president of sales and marketing for Singapore Airlines until returning to Scoot for a second stint as CEO in April 2020.

== Air India ==
Wilson assumed the post of CEO and managing director of Air India on 25 July 2022, immediately after the privatisation of the airline. During his tenure, Tata Group was involved in the talks to merge Air India with Vistara, owned by Singapore Airlines, his previous employer..

Wilson resigned as CEO of Air India in April 2026 as losses mounted at the airline and in the aftermath of the deadly Air India Flight 171 crash of June 2025 that killed 260 people, although he remained in post until a replacement was appointed in August 2026.
