= List of defunct airlines of India =

This is a list of defunct airlines of India.

Airline	Image	IATA	ICAO	Callsign	Commenced operations	Ceased operations	Notes
Air Carnival		2S	ACV	CARNAIR	2016	2017	
Air Costa		LB	LEP	LECOSTA	2013	2017	
Air India Cargo		AI	AIC	AIRINDIA	1932	2012	Still operates cargo via belly in passenger planes
Air Deccan (Mark I)		DN	DKN	DECCAN	2003	2008	Acquired by Kingfisher Airlines in 2007 and rebranded as Simplifly Deccan, later rebranded as Kingfisher Red in 2008.
Air Deccan (Mark II)		DN	DKN	AIR DECCAN	2017	2020	Relaunched under the UDAN Regional Connectivity Scheme, ceased operations in April 2020 as a result of the COVID-19 pandemic.
Air India Regional		CD;9I	LLR	ALLIED	2007	2017	Called Alliance Air from 1996 to 2007 then renamed back to Alliance Air in 2017.
Air Mantra		M1		MANTRA	2012	2013	
Air Odisha		6X		ODISHA	2012	2019	
Air Pegasus		OP	PPL	PEGASUS	2015	2016	
Air Services of India					1946	1953	
AirAsia India		I5	IAD	RED KNIGHT	2014	2022	Acquired by Tata Group, renamed to AIX Connect in 2023, later merged with Air India Express in 2024
Airways (India)					1945	1955	
Ambica Airlines					1947	1949	
Archana Airways		F5	ACY	ARCHANA	1991	1999	
Aryan Cargo Express		YE	ACQ	ACE CARGO	2005	2010	Stored in Chhatrapati Shivaji International Airport, Mumbai
Chhattisgarh Air Link					2012	2019	
Crescent Air Cargo		C8	CAC		2000	2006	
Damania Airways		D2	DMQ		1993	1997	Renamed/merged to Skyline NEPC
Darbhanga Aviation					1950	1962	
Deccan 360		3C	DEC	DECCAN CARGO	2009	2011	
Deccan Airways					1945	1953	
Dove Airlines					2007	2015	
East-West Airlines		W2	EWT		1992	1995	
Easy Air					2015	2015	Owned by Premier Airways
Elbee Airlines			LBE		1994	1998	
FlyBig		S9	FLG	KRIS	2020	2025	
Gujarat Airways		G8	GUJ	GUJARATI	1995	2001	
GoAir		G8	GOW	GOAIR	2005	2021	Renamed to Go First in 2021 and liquidated in 2023
Handley Page Indo-Burmese Transport							First airline in present-day India, operated in the early 1920s
Himalayan Air Transport & Survey					1934	1935	
Himalayan Aviation					1948	1953	Renamed to Indian Airlines
Hinduja Cargo Services		LF	LCI		1996	2000	
Indian Airlines		IC	IAC	INDAIR	1953	2011	Domestic National Carrier, merger with Air India started in 2007, completed in 2011.
Indian National Airways					1925	1945	
Indian Overseas Airlines					1947	1950	
Indus Air		O9	ACY		2006	2007	
Irrawaddy Flotilla & Airways					1934	1939	Its fall was triggered by the Japanese invasion of Burma in 1942
Jagson Airlines			JGN	JAGSON	2005	2010	
Jamair					1946	1977	
Jet Airways		9W	JAI	JET AIRWAYS	1993	2019	Ceased Operations in 2019, liquidation ordered in 2024 after multiple revival attempts stalled.
JetLite		S2	JLL	LITE JET	2007	2014	Renamed JetKonnect in 2012, merged into Jet Airways in 2014.
Jupiter Airways					1948	1953	
Kairali Airlines					2013	2017	
Kalinga Airlines					1946	1965	
Kingfisher Airlines		IT	KFR	KINGFISHER	2005	2012	Ceased operations in 2012, flying license suspended in 2013.
MDLR Airlines		9H	MDL	MDLR	2007	2009	
Mistri Airways					1946	1947	Renamed Indian Overseas Airlines
ModiLuft		HT, M9	MOD	MODILUFT	1994	1996	Was converted into SpiceJet by Ajay Singh
NEPC Airlines		D5	NEP		1993	1997	
Orient Airways					1946	1955	Became Pakistan International Airlines after transfer from Kolkata, India to Karachi, Pakistan
Paramount Airways		I7	PMW	PARAWAY	2005	2010	
Pushpaka Airlines					1979	1983	
Sahara Airlines (later Air Sahara)		S2	RSH	SAHARA	1993	2007	Rebranded as Air Sahara in 2000, Acquired by Jet Airways and rebranded as Jet Lite in 2007, rebranded as Jet Konnect in 2012, merged into Jet Airways in 2014.
Supreme Airlines					2016	2018	
Transportes Aéreos da Índia Portuguesa					1955	1961	Operated from Portuguese India
TruJet		2T	TRJ	TRUJET	2015	2022	
UP Air					1995	1998	
Vayudoot		PF	VDT	VAYU	1981	1997	
VIF Airways		V2	VIF		1995	1996	Based at Begumpet airport, Hyderabad, operated 30-seat Dornier 328-110 aircraft.
Vistara		UK	VTI	VISTARA	2015	2024	Merged with Air India
Zooom Air		ZO	ZOM	ZOOM	2013	2024	

== See also ==
- List of airlines of India
