= Indian Airlines Flight 403 =

Airline accident

Coordinates: 17°27′11″N 078°28′03″E

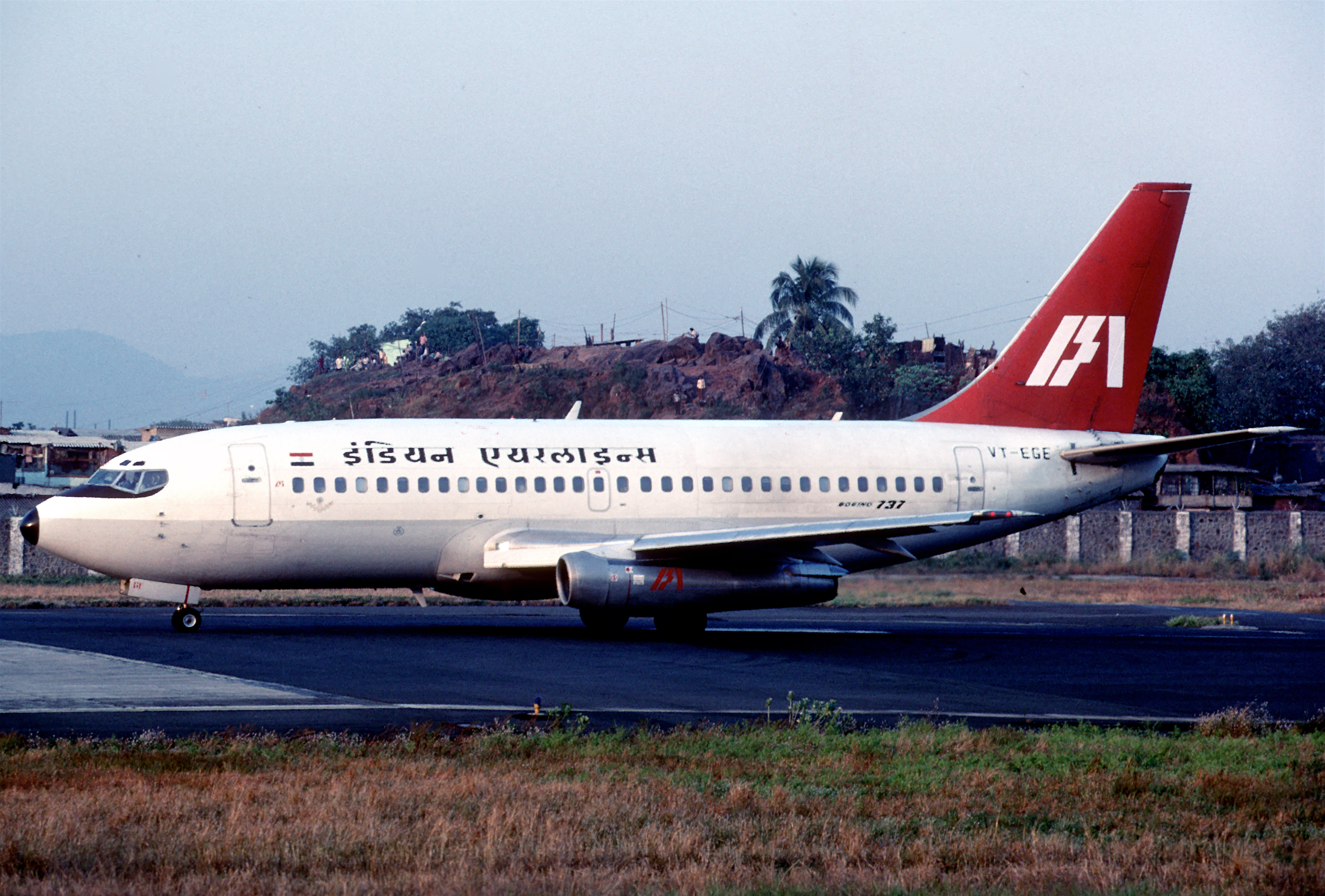
- An Indian Airlines Boeing 737-200 similar to the one involved

Accident
- Date: 17 December 1978
- Summary: Runway overrun due to mechanical failure
- Site: Begumpet Airport, Telangana, India
- Total fatalities: 4

Aircraft
- Aircraft type: Boeing 737-2A8
- Operator: Indian Airlines
- IATA flight No.: IC403
- ICAO flight No.: IAC403
- Call sign: INDAIR 403
- Registration: VT-EAL
- Flight origin: Begumpet Airport, Telangana
- Destination: Bangalore International Airport
- Occupants: 132
- Passengers: 126
- Crew: 6
- Fatalities: 1
- Survivors: 131

Ground casualties
- Ground fatalities: 3

Indian Airlines Flight 403 was a scheduled domestic passenger flight from Begumpet Airport in Hyderabad to Bangalore. On 17 December 1978, the Boeing 737-2A8 crashed during takeoff, killing one passenger and causing three additional ground casualties.

== Aircraft ==
The aircraft involved was a Boeing 737-2A8 registered as VT-EAL. The plane was seven years and ten months old at the time of the crash. It was powered by two Pratt & Whitney JT8D-9A turbojet engines.

== Accident ==
During takeoff from Runway 09 at Begumpet Airport, the aircraft entered a stall. The flight crew aborted the takeoff and attempted a wheels-up landing. The aircraft skidded 3,080 feet (940 m), overshooting the runway and breaking the airport's perimeter fence before coming to a stop in flames. One passenger was killed, along with three more people who were cutting grass near the airport fence at the time of the accident.

== Investigation ==
Investigators determined that the leading edge devices were not extended during rotation due to a technical fault.

== See also ==
- China Northwest Airlines Flight 2119
