= Kalinga Airlines =

Private airline

- Founded: 1946; 80 years ago
- Ceased operations: 1972; 54 years ago
- Headquarters: Calcutta, India
- Key people: Biju Patnaik(Founder & Chief Pilot)

Kalinga Airlines was a private airline based in Calcutta, India. It was founded in 1947 by aviator and politician Biju Patnaik, who was also the airline's chief pilot. The airline was nationalised and merged into Indian Airlines in 1953. It restarted operations as a non-scheduled charter operator in 1957 and flew passengers and cargo until 1972.

== History ==
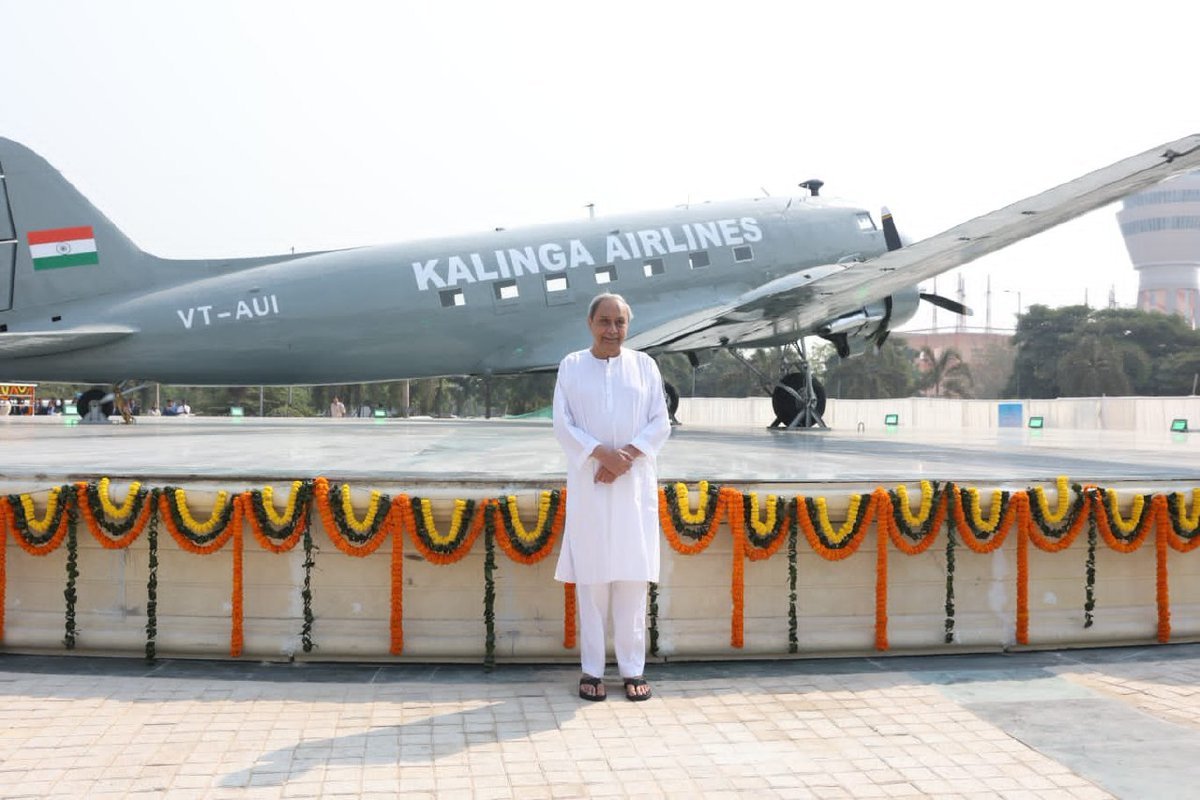
Odisha Former Chief Minister Naveen Pattnaik with a Kalinga Airlines Dakota at Biju Patnaik international Airport

In 1947, Biju Patnaik, who used to be a Royal Indian Air Force World War II Spitfire and DC-3 pilot, carried soldiers into Kashmir, landing the first platoon of troops in Srinagar. Kalinga Airlines' DC-3s were also used to drop supplies in Northeast India.

In 1953, the airline, along with other seven independent domestic airlines including Deccan Airways, Airways India, Bharat Airways, Himalayan Aviation, Indian National Airways, Air India and Air Services of India were nationalised and merged into the Indian Airlines Corporation. Kalinga Airways restarted operations in December 1957 with the merger of five airlines, Assam Airways, Indamer Airways, Jamair, Kalinga and Darbhanga Aviations with a fleet of 15 DC-3s. Since May 1960, Kalinga specialised in supply drops in the Northeast. Non-scheduled operations from Bombay to Dubai were also operated but were suspended in October 1962 to focus on supply dropping. The air-drop operations were taken over by the Indian Air Force in June 1967 and the airline reverted to passenger and cargo charters until February 1972.

== Incidents and accidents ==
- On 31 December 1951, a DC-3 carrying three crew members struck trees while climbing in limited visibility conditions.
- On 15 September 1952, a Kalinga Airlines Douglas Dakota cargo flight crashed in Wadi Halfa, Sudan, killing three crew members aboard.
- On 10 April 1952, Douglas C-47A-25-DK carrying four crew members lost control when carrying out an emergency landing following an engine failure.
- On 30 August 1955, a Kalinga Airlines Douglas Dakota lifted off prematurely in Simra, Nepal, in order to avoid hitting someone crossing the runway. Two of the three crew members aboard were killed.
- On 17 October 1965, a Douglas C-47A-75-DL carrying 8 people, including 5 passengers, crashed while dropping supplies in Mohanbari.
