= NEPC =

NEPC may refer to:

- National Education Policy Center of the University of Colorado at Boulder.
- NEPC India (Natural Energy Processing Company) Ltd., a corporate group based in Chennai founded by Ravi Prakash Khemka.
  - NEPC Airlines, a former airline belonging to the NEPC group.
