= NEPC Airlines =

Indian private airline

IATA	ICAO	Call sign
D5	NEP	NEPC
- Founded: 1993; 33 years ago
- Commenced operations: 1993; 33 years ago
- Ceased operations: 1997; 29 years ago
- AOC #: 1. 298
- Frequent-flyer program: Skyline
- Subsidiaries: Skyline NEPC
- Fleet size: 9
- Headquarters: Chennai

NEPC Airlines was a private airline that operated from 1993 to 1997. It was headquartered in Chennai, then known as Madras, and was promoted by the Chennai-based NEPC group, founded by Ravi Prakash Khemka.

== History ==
The NEPC (Natural Energy Processing Co Ltd) group acquired management control in Damania Airways and renamed it as Skyline NEPC in May 1995. NEPC Airlines and its subsidiary, Skyline NEPC, were grounded in 1997. The International Air Transport Association (IATA) suspended them for non-payment of dues following which they were taken off the computerised reservation system (CRS).

== Destinations ==
India

- Agartala (Agartala Airport)
- Agatti (Agatti Airport)
- Aurangabad (Aurangabad Airport)
- Bangalore (Bangalore Airport)
- Belgaum (Belgaum Airport)
- Bhavnagar (Bhavnagar Airport)
- Bhubaneshwar (Biju Patnaik Airport)
- Chennai (Chennai Airport)
- Coimbatore (Coimbatore Airport)
- Dibrugarh (Dibrugarh Airport)
- Dimapur (Dimapur Airport)
- Guwahati (Guwahati Airport)
- Hyderabad (Begumpet Airport)
- Imphal (Imphal Airport)
- Jaipur (Jaipur Airport)
- Jamnagar (Jamnagar Airport)
- Jorhat (Jorhat Airport)
- Kandla (Kandla Airport)
- Keshod (Keshod Airport)
- Kochi (INS Garuda)
- Kolkata (Netaji Subhas Chandra Bose International Airport)
- Madurai (Madurai Airport)
- Mangalore (Mangalore Airport)
- Mumbai (Chhatrapati Shivaji Maharaj International Airport)
- North Lakhimpur (Lilabari Airport)
- Patna (Patna Airport)
- Porbandar (Porbandar Airport)
- Pune (Pune Airport)
- Raipur (Raipur Airport)
- Rajkot (Rajkot Airport)
- Silchar (Silchar Airport)
- Tezpur (Tezpur Airport)
- Tiruchirapalli (Tiruchirapalli Airport)
- Tuticorin (Tuticorin Airport)
- Vadodara (Vadodara Airport)
- Varanasi (Varanasi Airport)
- Visakhapatnam (Visakhapatnam Airport)
