= HAL Airport =

Airport of Bangalore, Karnataka, India

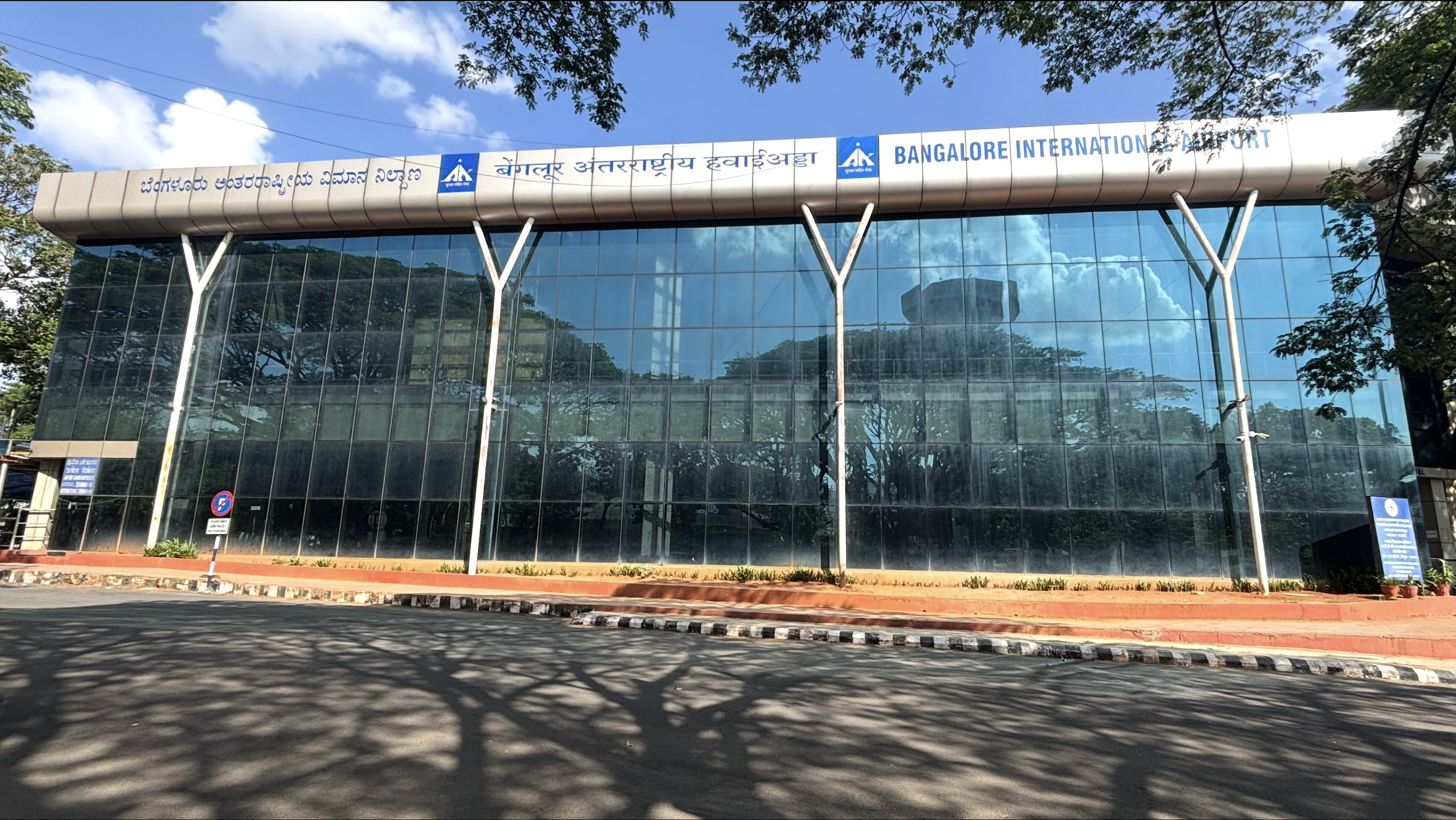
- IATA: ~~BLR~~; ICAO: VOBG

Summary
- Airport type: Military/public
- Owner/Operator: Hindustan Aeronautics Limited
- Location: Bengaluru, Karnataka, India
- Opened: 1941
- Passenger services ceased: 24 May 2008
- Elevation AMSL: 2,915 ft (888 m)
- Coordinates: 12°57′8″N 77°39′52″E

Map
- Location within Bengaluru Location within Karnataka Location within India

Runways
Direction	Length		Surface
Direction	m	ft	Surface
09/27	3,306	10,846	Asphalt

Statistics (April 2025 – March 2026)
- Passengers: 19,941 (▲15.5%)
- Aircraft movements: 5,299 (▲25.2%)
- Cargo tonnage: —
- Source: AAI

HAL Airport (ICAO: VOBG) is an airport that serves Bengaluru, the capital of the Indian state of Karnataka. Located 12 kilometres (7.5 mi) southeast of the city centre, it has one runway. Hindustan Aeronautics Limited (HAL), a state-owned defence company, owns the airport, which it and the Indian Air Force use as a testing facility. The airport also caters to charter flights and general aviation, including VIP flights and business aviation.

The airport commenced operations in 1941 as the home of India's first aircraft factory, which was established by the company Hindustan Aircraft Limited. The Allies employed the airfield as a repair facility during the Second World War, after which it began to receive commercial flights. In the 1990s, HAL requested sole use of the airport, resulting in the planning of another one. Meanwhile, the HAL airport went through expansions and upgrades to keep pace with the growing civilian air traffic in the city. The civil enclave was replaced by the new airport, now known as Kempegowda International Airport, in 2008.

== History ==
=== Beginnings ===
Indian entrepreneur Walchand Hirachand wanted to be the first to build aeroplanes in India during the Second World War. He partnered with American businessman William Pawley and the princely state of Mysore to erect a factory in Bangalore. A company called Hindustan Aircraft Limited (HAL) was created and construction commenced in December 1940. (Note: In 1964, Hindustan Aircraft Limited would combine with Aeronautics India Limited to create Hindustan Aeronautics Limited, retaining the acronym HAL.) The factory began operations in 1941. Japan's entry into the war led the government of India to take control of HAL the following year. The United States Army Tenth Air Force arrived and redirected the factory toward the repair and overhaul of aircraft and engines. It took over the facility in 1943. Workers serviced aircraft such as C-47 Dakotas and B-25 Mitchells, and seaplanes were tested at the adjacent Bellandur Lake. The Americans handed the HAL factory back to the Indian government in 1945 after the war ended.

As of 1939, the Mysore government was building a civil aerodrome for Bangalore at Jakkur. The airfield had passenger service in 1940. After the war, the HAL airport opened to commercial flights, which operated out of a civil enclave. Deccan Airways introduced service to Hyderabad in May 1946. As of 1952, four airlines were flying nonstop from the airport to four cities. The following year, the national government combined all domestic carriers into a single company called Indian Airlines.

Indian began flying Caravelle jets on the Bombay–Bangalore–Madras route in April 1965. In the 1970s, HAL and the Indian Air Force used the airport in the morning, so passenger flights were concentrated in the afternoon. By 1977 Indian Airlines had deployed wide-body Airbus A300s on flights to Bangalore. An expansion project was completed the following year, with features including a larger conveyor belt, new lounge, and wider car park. Due to the rate at which air traffic was rising and the arrival of the A300, the programme was already deemed insufficient. During the 1980–1981 fiscal year, Indian carried 550,000 passengers to and from the HAL airport. The carrier linked Bangalore to seven destinations in 1982. The airport handled international flights in 1986 when Bangalore hosted the second summit of the South Asian Association for Regional Cooperation.

=== Plans for a new airport ===
In 1991, HAL conveyed to the state government that it no longer wished to share its airport with commercial airlines. State officials began to plan the construction of a new airport for Bangalore through a public–private partnership. A group of private companies including Tata Industries, Raytheon, and Singapore Changi Airport evinced interest in the project and signed a memorandum of understanding with the Karnataka government in 1995; the agreement specified that passenger flights would switch to the new facility upon its inauguration. Meanwhile, Bangalore's global stature rose as its information technology industry expanded, leading to greater traffic at the HAL airport. The daily passenger count climbed from one thousand in 1991 to more than six thousand in 1997.

However, HAL later dropped its demand. The enterprise and the Airports Authority of India (AAI) shared the earnings from the airport, and HAL feared the impact the closure would have on its revenue. The union government supported keeping the HAL airport open to commercial flights alongside the new airport. On the other hand, the consortium insisted that the civil enclave would need to cease operations in order to ensure the new airport's profitability. State officials added that the lake, apartment complexes, and other buildings surrounding the HAL airport made it difficult to expand the site to accommodate future growth in air traffic. The parties failed to reach an agreement, and the consortium exited the venture in 1998.

UB Air, the country's first private carrier since the liberalisation of the airline industry, launched service from its Bangalore base in 1990. Air India commenced the first scheduled international flight to Singapore in January 1995. A storage facility for perishable goods opened in 1998, making Bangalore the second airport in India to have one. The AAI constructed a new international terminal, which was inaugurated by Prime Minister Atal Bihari Vajpayee in January 1999. The central government characterised the terminal as a short-term measure and said it still wanted to build a new airport with support from the private sector. Later that year, the Karnataka government and Ministry of Civil Aviation formed a partnership as minority stakeholders in the project and began accepting new bids for a private firm.

=== Growth and transfer of civilian operations ===
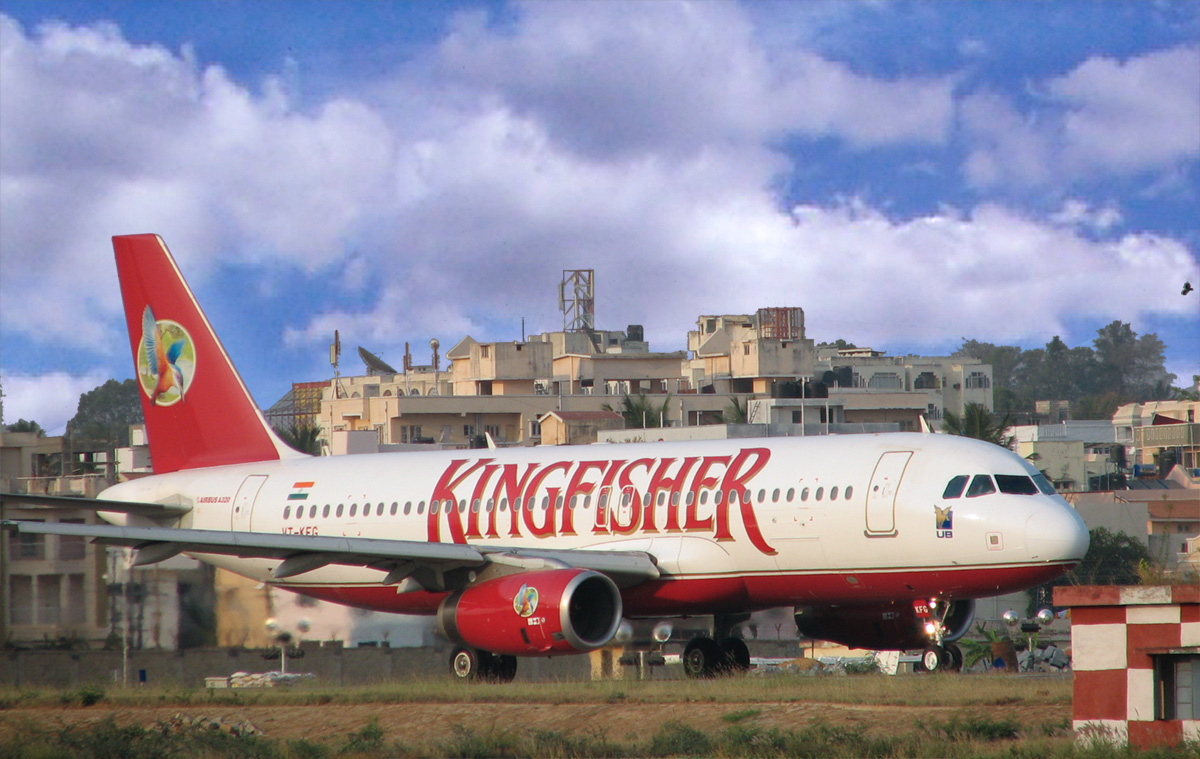
A Kingfisher Airlines Airbus A320-200 jet taxiing at the airport

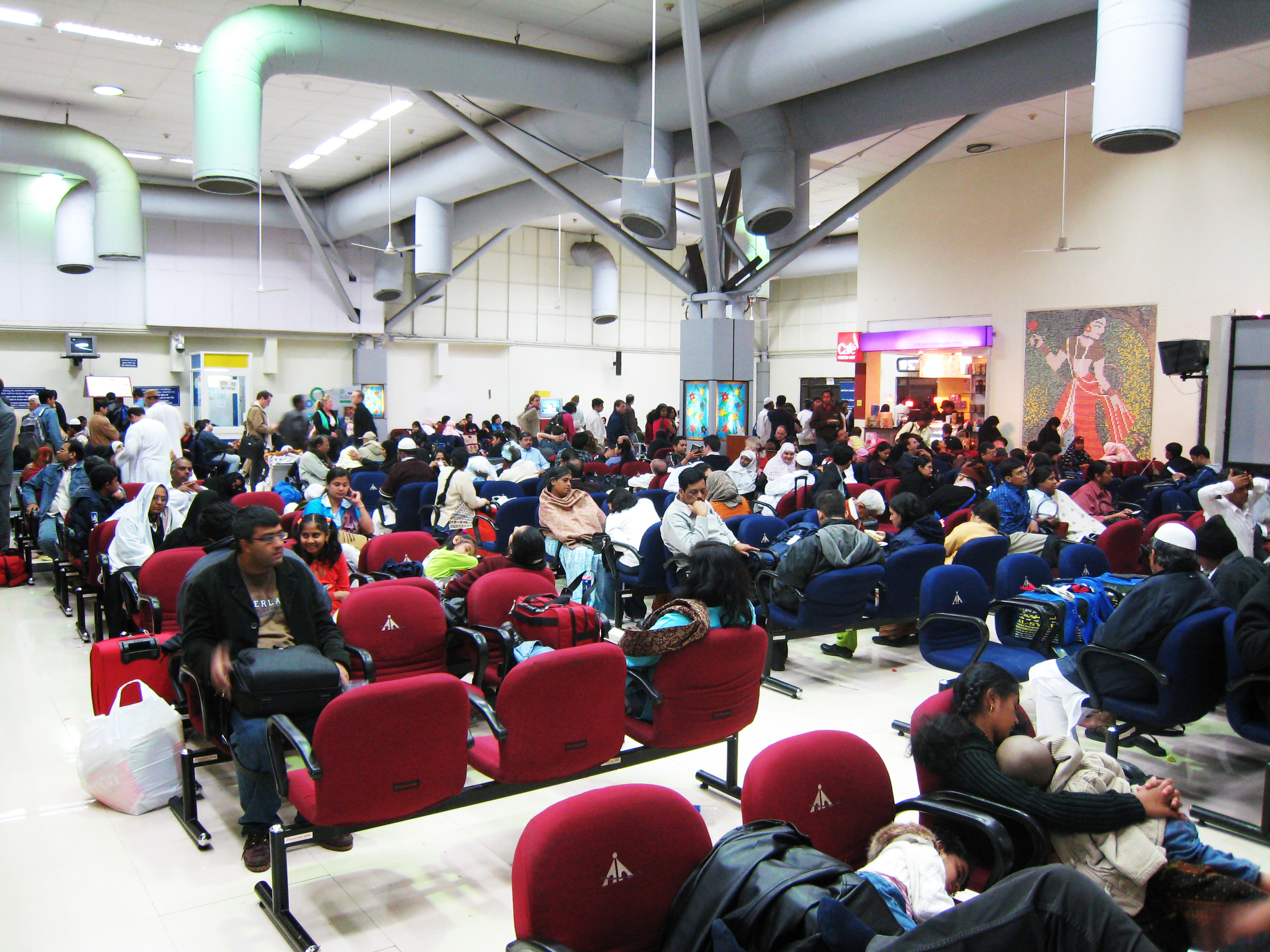
Departures hall

The HAL airport acquired new air service. In October 2000, the airport received its first foreign carrier, Royal Nepal Airlines, which initiated a route to Kathmandu. The following September, Lufthansa launched flights to Frankfurt, signalling the first time the South Indian metropolis had a direct link to Europe. Air Deccan established its first base at the HAL airport upon starting operations in 2003. As of 2005, Bangalore was the third busiest airport in India with respect to domestic operations, and more international travellers were arriving as well. Carriers like British Airways and Air France, which began service to the city on the same day that year, contributed to this growth. The airport was connected to foreign destinations like Bangkok, London, and Sharjah. In April 2008, Air Mauritius added a route between Bangalore and the African island.

Meanwhile, a company called Bangalore International Airport Limited (BIAL) signed a concession agreement in 2004 with the state and national governments to build a new, larger airport. Similar to the memorandum that the original consortium had signed, the contract barred commercial flights from operating at the HAL airport for 25 years after the new facility opened. The following year, BIAL started construction at a site 35 kilometres (22 mi) from downtown in the suburb of Devanahalli.

The large amount of traffic placed strain on the HAL airport. The terminals and parking lot became congested. Many international flights were scheduled within a short period in the middle of the night, leading to overcrowding in the respective terminal. Additionally, the apron had only six parking stands for passenger aircraft. HAL said that civilian operations at the airport were hindering its activities, which ranged from flying sorties to evaluating aircraft prototypes. The Hindu wrote that the state of the HAL airport ran counter to Bangalore's reputation as a high-tech centre. To improve the situation, the AAI and HAL collaborated on a renovation programme in 2006. They constructed extra parking bays and installed new air traffic control technology. In the terminals, they added ticket counters and increased the seating capacity. Ten domestic airlines and eleven foreign carriers were serving the airport in 2007, and 10.1 million passengers passed through the terminals in the 2007–2008 fiscal year.

Some people, including a civic organisation called Bangalore City Connect and an Air Deccan executive, opposed the discontinuation of passenger flights from the HAL airport. They said it would take too long to reach the new airport and the high demand for air travel made it sensible for the city to have two airports. Additionally, 20,000 AAI workers across India held a strike in March 2008 over the closure of the civil enclaves in Bangalore and Hyderabad. The High Court of Karnataka rejected petitions to maintain commercial operations at the HAL airport. The last international flight was operated by Singapore Airlines, departing at 23:23 on 23 May 2008. There were two flights to Delhi that took off after midnight on 24 May. That day the new airport, now known as Kempegowda International Airport, commenced operations.

== Facilities and operations ==
HAL Airport has one asphalt runway, which is oriented to 90/270 degrees and measures 3,306 by 61 metres (10,846 ft × 200 ft). It is equipped with a category I instrument landing system.

HAL and the Indian Air Force perform test flights from the airport. The facility also accommodates non-scheduled civilian operations, including VIP and charter flights. It serves as a training site for commercial airline pilots. The HAL airport does not function as a diversion alternative to Kempegowda International Airport, as HAL no longer has a licence from the Directorate General of Civil Aviation. An AirAsia India flight in 2015 was an exception. The Deccan Chronicle reported that the aircraft was running low on fuel; the airline stated that it had enough fuel to reach Chennai but the runway there was unavailable.

The closed civil enclave was officially known as Bangalore International Airport. It occupied 20 acres (8.1 ha) and had two terminals labelled domestic and international. The domestic terminal handled departing domestic passengers, while the international terminal was used by international and arriving domestic travellers. The international terminal had two aerobridges. The airport bookstore, Sankars, was open for more than four decades and known for its varied collection and friendly staff.

== Statistics ==
Passenger numbers at the HAL airport
Period (April–March)	Count	Percent change	Ref.
2001–2002	2,276,300	—	
2002–2003	3,026,700	▲33.0	
2003–2004	3,181,200	▲5.11	
2004–2005	4,113,400	▲29.3	
2005–2006	5,654,700	▲37.5	
2006–2007	8,125,000	▲43.7	
2007–2008	10,121,000	▲24.6	

== Incidents and accidents ==
- On 15 September 1951, an Air India Douglas C-47 Dakota crashed as it was departing the airport. Of the 25 people on board, 1 crew member died in the accident.
- On 21 October 1963, a transport aircraft belonging to the Indian Air Force crashed as it was preparing to land, killing 8 of the 21 people aboard.
- 14 February 1990: Indian Airlines Flight 605, an Airbus A320, crashed on final approach with 92 fatalities.
- 28 December 1996: A Blue Dart Aviation Boeing 737 made a heavy, off-centre landing, causing damage to the aircraft.
- 12 February 2004: A helicopter being used by the HAL Rotary Wing Academy crashed, injuring both occupants.
- 26 October 2005: An Indian Air Force MiG-21 crashed, killing the pilot.
- 11 March 2006: An Air Deccan ATR 72 with 40 passengers and 4 crew members veered off the runway while landing. Nine people were injured.
- 4 May 2006: A Transmile Air Services Boeing 727-200F suffered damage to the left-wing fuel tank.
- 21 August 2006: A Kiran Mark II trainer aircraft landed on its fuselage after the wheels failed to deploy.
- 6 March 2009: A NAL Saras aircraft prototype that had taken off from HAL Airport crashed in a field near Bidadi, killing the three-man crew of test pilots.
- 1 February 2019: An Indian Air Force Mirage 2000 modified by HAL on an acceptance flight crashed while departing; both pilots ejected but suffered burns and died.

== See also ==
- Begumpet Airport: Another Indian airport whose civil enclave closed in 2008
