= Balagam =

- village
- Location in Gujarat, India Balagam (India)
- Coordinates: 21°22′10″N 70°05′53″E
- Country: India
- State: Gujarat
- District: Junagadh

Population
  - Total: 10,000

Languages
  - Official: Gujarati, Hindi
- Time zone: UTC+5:30 (IST)
- PIN: 362220
- Vehicle registration: GJ
- Nearest city: Keshod
- Website: gujaratindia.com

Balagam is a small town near Bantva, Keshod, Junagadh District, Gujarat, India.

== History ==
Formerly, during Muslim period, this village was called Ghebanpur and was almost entirely inhabited by Muslims but afterwards falling waste it was repopulated by a Sorathia Ahir Darned Balva, and after him has been called Balagam, but others say that it is called Balagam because built on a lofty site. During British period, Balagam was a separate revenue subdivision under Junagadh.

== Places of interest ==
There are here a sect of Margi Sadhus, who consider one Das Bava, an ascetic of the Sagar tribe of Kshatriya Sagar Rajputs, as their religious preceptor. These people are called Das Panthis. Das is said to have gone once to bathe in the village well and to have been subsequently seen no more, and his worshipers consider that he was caught up into heaven. His turban was found on the steps of the well, and is still adored by his followers.

About a mile to the east of the village is the temple of Vasangdevi, the tutelary goddess of the Joshipura tribe of the Vadanagar Nagar Brahmins.

== See also ==
- Memon
