= Pransli =

Village in Gujarat, India

Pransli is a village in the Keshod tehsil of Junagadh district, situated in the state of Gujarat, India.

== Demography ==
As of 2011, Pransli has a total number of 374 houses and population of 1751 of which 895 include are males while 856 are females according to the report published by Census India in 2011. The literacy rate of Pransli is 71.27%, lower than the state average of 79.31%. The population of children under the age of 6 years is 178 which is 10.17% of total population of Pransli, and child sex ratio is approximately 1023 as compared to Gujarat state average of 890.

As per the report published by Census India in 2011, 1146 people were engaged in work activities out of the total population of Pransli which includes 581 males and 565 females. According to census survey report 2011, 53.58% workers describe their work as main work and 46.42% workers are involved in Marginal activity providing livelihood for less than 6 months.
