= Indian Airlines Flight 605 =

1990 aviation accident in India

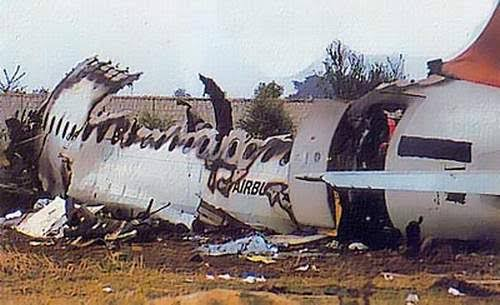
- Wreckage of the aircraft

Accident
- Date: 14 February 1990
- Summary: Controlled flight into terrain due to pilot error
- Site: Karnataka Golf Association, near Hindustan Airport, Bangalore; 12.9481°N 77.6478°E

Aircraft
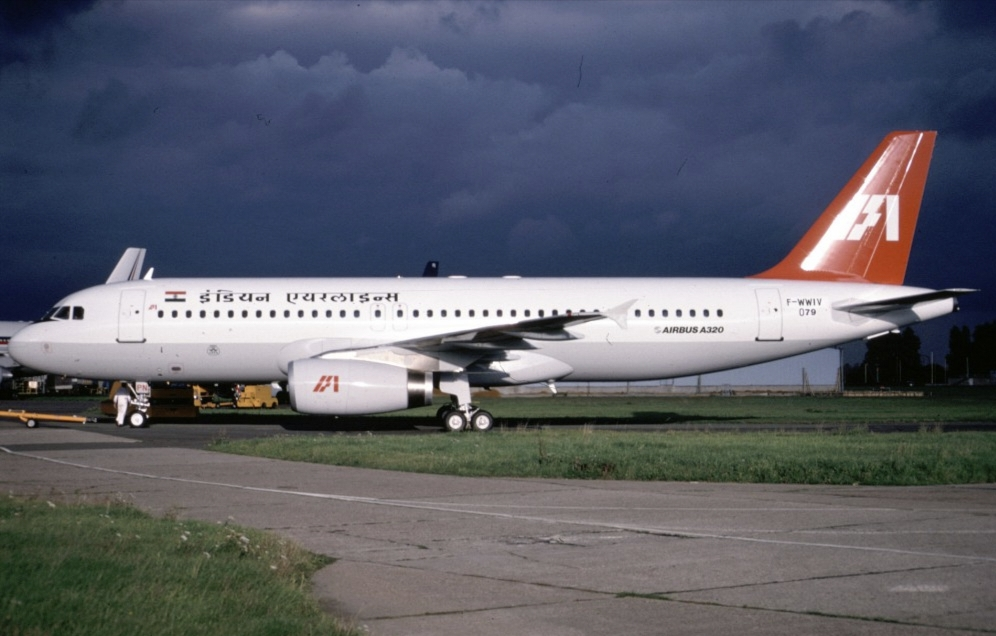
- The aircraft involved in the accident before delivery in 1989; notice the double-bogie main landing gear
- Aircraft type: Airbus A320-231
- Operator: Indian Airlines
- IATA flight No.: IC605
- ICAO flight No.: IAC605
- Call sign: INDAIR 605
- Registration: VT-EPN
- Flight origin: Chhatrapati Shivaji Maharaj International Airport, Bombay, India
- Destination: Hindustan Airport, Bangalore, India
- Occupants: 146
- Passengers: 139
- Crew: 7
- Fatalities: 92
- Injuries: 54
- Survivors: 54

Indian Airlines Flight 605 was a scheduled domestic passenger flight from Bombay to Bangalore. On 14 February 1990, an Airbus A320 registered as VT-EPN, crashed onto a golf course while attempting to land at Bangalore, killing 92 of 146 people on board.

The Indian investigative team ruled that the probable cause was the pilots selecting the "Open descent/flight idle" control mode rather than "Glideslope capture", allowing the aircraft to sink far below the correct flight path. They further failed to advance the throttles or pull up even after the radio altitude call-outs, as the aircraft approached landing. The report stated that the crew of Flight 605 weren't aware of the situation and the danger they were facing at the time, resulting in delayed reaction during the descent.

After the crash, the Indian investigation committee issued 62 recommendations to the Indian Directorate General of Civil Aviation (DGCA), including a time recording on the air traffic control (ATC) tapes and the formation of several investigative committees specializing in several aviation operational issues. Included in the recommendation was the addition of a crash siren in Bangalore, evaluation of the evacuation doors and slides in Airbus airplanes, and a design change on their instrument knob. The report also urged the government to evaluate every airport in India to prevent similar incidents from occurring.

The crash drew criticism among the Indian Commercial Pilots' Association (ICPA) which claimed that the A320 had severe flaws. They claimed that the aircraft's systems were too confusing and that the crew of Flight 605 was struggling to avert the crash.

Another A320 accident in France less than two years later (which occurred under similar circumstances) led to design improvements to the flight control unit and numerous safety recommendations.

== Aircraft ==
The aircraft involved was an Airbus A320-231, registered as VT-EPN, serial number 79 and was around 5 months old. The aircraft had logged around 370 flight hours over 302 flights and was equipped with two IAE V2500-A1 engines.

== Flight ==
=== Take-off and approach ===
Flight 605 took off from Bombay Airport at 11:58 local time after an hour delay. Prior to this, the aircraft was used for two other flights on the day of the accident, operating as Flight 669 and Flight 670, flying from Bombay to Goa and back. The aircraft was carrying 139 passengers and 7 crew members, including 4 infants. The aircraft's assigned route was on route W17 from Bombay to Belgaum via Karad and W56 from Belgaum to Bangalore. The take-off phase and en route phase proceeded normally.

At 12:53 local time, Flight 605's radar plot appeared on Bangalore's radar. Flight 605 was asked by Bangalore Radar to turn right and make a visual approach to Runway 09. The crew disengaged the autopilot and later changed to the Bangalore Tower after being transferred by Bangalore Radar.

=== Crash ===
While Flight 605 was attempting to land, the pilots flew far below the glideslope, and the landing gear touched down on the grounds of the Karnataka Golf Association, approximately 2,800 ft (850 m) from the airport. Most people on the aircraft, including some crew members, thought that the aircraft had touched down on the runway as it was similar to its normal landing. Flight 605 then bounced and shortly later impacted the ground for the second time. The impact caused several people's seat belts to fail, leading people to be thrown from their seats and hit the aircraft's floor. Flight 605 later struck a 12 ft (3.7 m) embankment. Both the engines and landing gear detached from the aircraft. The aircraft then flew over a road and crashed into a grassy, rocky area near the airport.

=== Search and rescue ===
After the crash, a post-impact fire started and the survivors began to escape from the burning wreckage. Several people managed to get out of the plane from an opening in the aircraft's fuselage. The surviving cabin crew opened the emergency door on the airplane and began to evacuate the survivors. 92 people, consisting of 88 passengers and 4 crew, perished in the crash, while 54 survived, all with injuries. Two people succumbed to their injuries after the accident.

According to eyewitnesses, no fire service units reached the crash site as there was no radio transmitter (RT) communication facility between the tower and firefighting vehicles. A portable radio transmitter was available for communication between the tower and the aerodrome fire station, but was not serviceable on the day of the accident.

== Passengers and crew ==
Flight 605 carried 139 passengers and 7 crew members, consisting of 2 cockpit crew and 5 cabin crew. There were 4 infants aboard the flight.

The pilot who controlled the flight was Indian national Captain Cyril Fernandez at 46 years old. He joined Indian Airlines in 1977 as a pilot and was promoted to the position of co-pilot. Eventually, he became Captain of a Hawker Siddeley HS 748. In 1983, Fernandez obtained a Boeing 737 co-pilot rating, followed by a Captain rating in 1984. Fernandez became the co-pilot of an Airbus A320 in 1989. Fernandez had a total flying experience of 9,307 hours, of which 68 hours were spent on the Airbus A320.

According to the report, Captain Fernandez was under supervision as he was undergoing the first of 10 route checks required for qualification to captain. During the flight, he was seated in the left seat.

The pilot who supervised Captain Fernandez was Indian national Captain Satish Gopujkar at 44 years old. He joined Indian Airlines in 1969 and was employed as a co-pilot on a Hawker Siddeley HS 748 from 1971 to 1981, later flying the plane as a captain. In 1981, he obtained a Boeing 737 co-pilot rating and later, a pilot in command rating in 1983. In 1989, he was promoted as a co-pilot on an Airbus A320. Captain Gopujkar had a total flying experience of 10,340 hours, of which 255 hours were on the Airbus A320. During the flight, he was carrying out the duties of both the co-pilot and the check pilot.

Before Flight 605, Captain Gopujkar was involved in a taxiing incident in Cochin, although he was not blamed for the incident. During Flight 605, he was seated in the right seat.

== Casualties ==
92 people were killed in the crash, including Captain Gopujkar and Captain Fernandez. According to official reports: amongst the 54 injured people, at least 20 had suffered head injuries, 32 suffered lower limb injuries, while 7 sustained thoracic injuries. Details in the report revealed that most of the dead suffered major trauma during the crash. At least 81 victims were revealed to have suffered shock and burn injuries.

The report then stated that several passengers may have been too injured to move, leaving them physically unable to escape from the burning wreckage. They may have survived the impact, but due to the injuries they suffered during the crash, they couldn't escape. The report stated that most people seated near the emergency exits and slides survived the crash.

As most survivors and victims of the crash suffered head and leg injuries, the investigative team stated that those injuries might have occurred to the passengers (and some of the crew) on board as a result of the inadequate leg room. In addition, during the crash, several seats were thrust forward, causing several passengers' head to slam into the back of the seat in front of them.

== Investigation ==
The Indian Ministry of Civil Aviation ordered an investigation into the crash. The Indian AAIB and the Canadian TSB were involved in the investigation. On 19 February, investigators visited the crash site and inspected the wreckage of the aircraft. They noted that the front part of the aircraft was destroyed during its impact with the embankment. A subsequent fire led to the total destruction of the aircraft.

=== Initial inspection ===
Investigators then inspected the flight controls of Flight 605, viz. the rudder, the ailerons, the trimmable horizontal stabilizer, the flaps and slats, and several other flight controls. However, they didn't find any abnormalities on these controls. Control failure was ruled out as a possible cause of the crash. According to investigators, they also ruled out terrorism as a cause of the crash, as there were no signs of an onboard explosion during the approach and there was no evidence of explosives on board.

=== FDR and CVR analysis ===
After the discovery of the FDR and the CVR, investigators decoded and analyzed its contents.

Investigators made an analysis based on both flight recorders as follows: Flight 605 was approaching Bangalore Airport in 'open descent' mode. In this mode, the aircraft engines are at the idle throttle. People would notice this since the engines seem to turn silent, and the plane appears to be sinking gradually.

The crew of Flight 605 disengaged the autopilot when sighting the runway of Bangalore Airport. They later made contact with Bangalore Tower. At 01:40 pm local time, the aircraft display indicated that the plane's altitude had been just under 5000 feet and its approach path was 600 ft higher than the normal glide path.

Captain Fernandez noticed this and requested for a go-around. He would climb to 6,000 ft (1,800 m), do another circle and come back better aligned to the normal glide path. The check pilot, Captain Gopujkar then responded to his request: "Do you want a go around? Or do you want vertical speed?" Captain Fernandez chose to proceed with the vertical speed option. If the pilots had proceeded with the go-around, the emergency that was to follow could have been averted.

Since the plane was a little higher than the normal glide path, Captain Fernandez asked for a higher descent rate of 1000 ft/min, instead of the normal rate of 700 ft/min. This faster descent increased the aircraft speed to 275 km/h (148 kn; 171 mph) — higher than the recommended speed of 240 km/h (130 kn; 150 mph) — but it helped the aircraft regain the normal glide path. The aircraft was also now in the vertical speed mode — the correct mode for landing.

Captain Gopujkar then checked the landing checklist. After completing the checklist, he asked the cabin crew to be seated at their stations. Realizing that the aircraft had regained its normal glide path, Captain Gopujkar reported at 01:42 that he had now selected a "700 ft rate of descent". However, instead of choosing the vertical speed knob, he accidentally chose the altitude knob. So, instead of inputting an order for a 700 ft (210 m) rate of descent to the Airbus A320, he made an order to put the aircraft on an altitude of 700 ft.

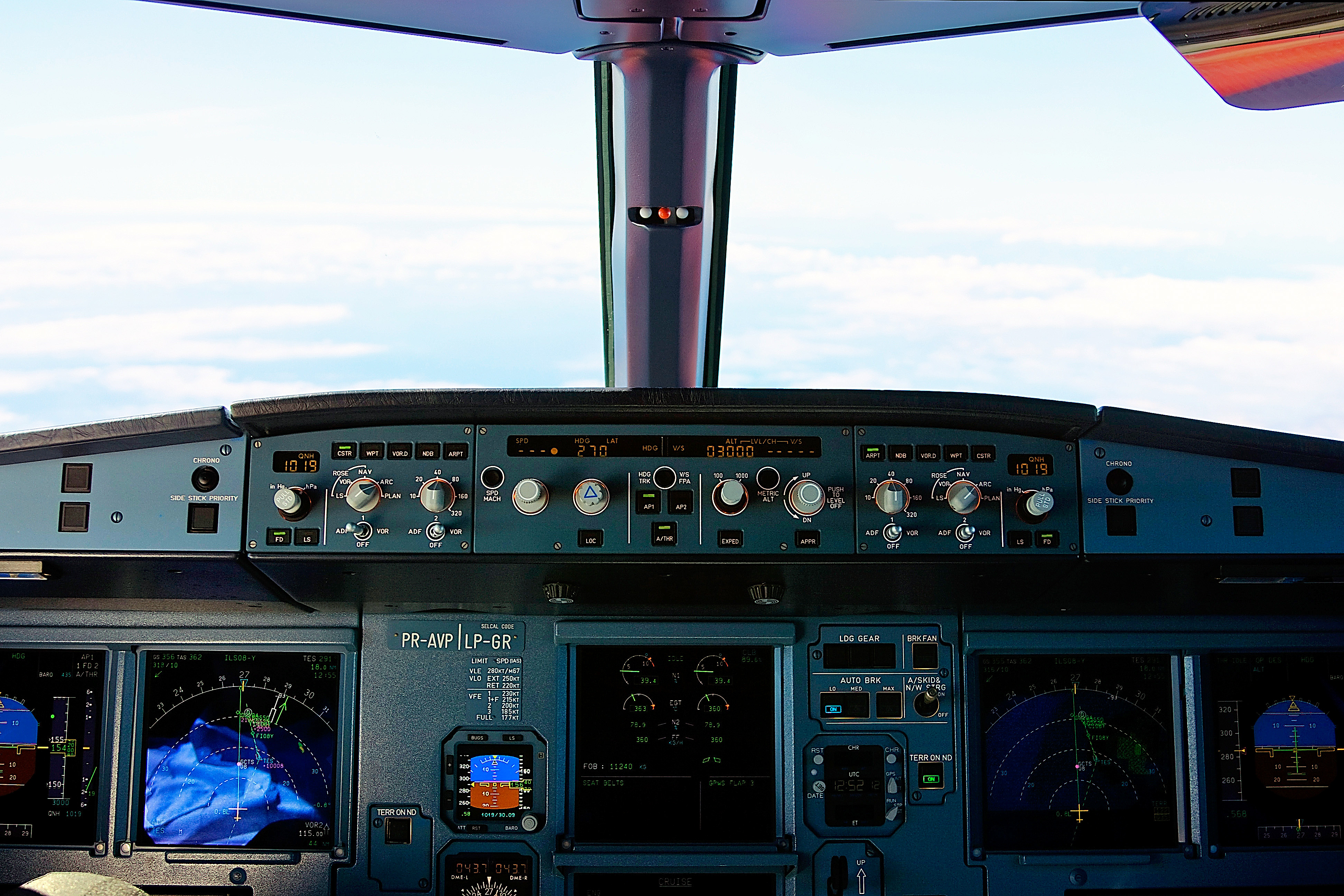
The cockpit of an Airbus A320. The ten control knobs are shown

The vertical speed knob and the altitude knob are located next to each other and have a similar design. This might have led to the confusion.

Because of Captain Gopujkar's action, the aircraft went back to the 'open descent' mode, causing the throttle to be in the idle position. The absence of engine power on the aircraft led to a decrease of the aircraft's speed, and the plane began descending more quickly. Despite the impending disaster, the crew of Flight 605 seemed to be unaware of it.

The plane's radio altimeter then sounded: "400 ft". This probably alerted Captain Gopujkar in some way because he suddenly observed: "You are descending on idle open descend eh, all this time!". And as the altimeter called out "300 ft", Captain Gopujkar asked: "You want flight directors off now?". Captain Fernandez confirmed that his flight director had been put off, Captain Gopujkar's however, hadn't. If both the flight directors had been put off at that point, the plane would have gone to the speed mode, sensing that speed was dropping, and enough engine power could have been generated for a possible recovery even at that late stage.

The plane continued to hurtle downwards. When the plane was only 135 ft (41 m) from the ground, Captain Fernandez suddenly realized the gravity of the situation and exclaimed: "Hey, we're going down!". Captain Gopujkar, himself stunned now, could only respond with "Oh, shit!" Those were his last recorded words. Captain Fernandez then ordered an immediate TOGA (Take-off Go-around). However, this action was too late. The aircraft did lift from the ground, however, it failed to clear a 12 ft (3.7 m) embankment and crashed. Investigators stated that if this action had been taken 2 seconds earlier, the disaster could have been averted.

=== Court's findings ===
The High Court of Karnataka reported that the accident was caused by the pilots failing to realize the gravity of the situation and failing to respond by immediately advancing the throttles, even after the radio altitude callouts of "Four Hundred," "Three Hundred" and "Two Hundred" feet, despite knowing that the plane was in idle/open descent mode.

== Controversy ==
India's investigative team concluded that pilot error was the cause of the accident, which was supported by Airbus Industries. However, the India Commercial Pilot Association (ICPA) disputed the report, claiming that a design flaw on the Airbus A320 was the cause of the crash.

The ICPA stated that the senior Captain of the flight, Captain Gopujkar, would not have made the series of mistakes described in the official report, and stated that there was no proof that he made the faulty setting (since the flight data recorder did not record such mistakes). The association also believed that the engines went to idle power because of a major system defect, and that, even when Gopujkar tried to shut his director off, it didn't respond. They also claimed that the time lag of 0.5 seconds for the auto-thrust controls to act proved to be disastrous.

At the time, the Airbus A320 was relatively new, having just been launched in 1988. Its main difference from other aircraft was that it used fly-by-wire (FBW) technology. In a conventional aircraft the pilot was in direct contact with the actuator; so if the pilot opened the throttle more, the actuator immediately gave the pilot more power. In the A320, however, the pilot's command is first directed to an onboard computer — and the actuator responds only when the computer determines that it is okay to do so.

Before the crash of Flight 605, an Airbus A320 had been involved in another crash, Air France Flight 296Q. The official investigation had determined that the cause of that crash was pilot error. However, the pilot had blamed the plane's fly-by-wire system for the crash. This claim had caused a major controversy about the Airbus A320.

== Aftermath ==
Less than two years after the crash of Flight 605, the A320 suffered another fatal accident when Air Inter Flight 148 crashed in France killing 87 people. The cause was also a CFIT like 605. The investigation of Flight 148 harshly criticized the Airbus A320's cockpit design. In response, changes were made to the Flight Control Unit panel display; the French aviation safety authority issued 34 recommendations.

== See also ==
- Airblue Flight 202 – A crash in Pakistan in which the pilot failed to pull a knob to put a heading setting into effect
- Air Inter Flight 148 – Similar crash in France involving an Airbus A320 which was caused by a design flaw on its autopilot
- British European Airways Flight 548 – Pilot retracted the aircraft's droop flaps too early, causing a fatal deep stall
