= Aryan Cargo Express =

Airline

IATA	ICAO	Call sign
YE	ACQ	ACE CARGO
- Founded: December 2005; 20 years ago
- Commenced operations: 2010; 16 years ago
- Ceased operations: December 2010; 15 years ago
- Hubs: Indira Gandhi International Airport
- Fleet size: 1
- Destinations: 5
- Headquarters: New Delhi, India
- Website: www.acex.in

Aryan Cargo Express was a cargo airline based in New Delhi, India.

It operated a single Airbus A310-300F. Plans for the introduction of an MD-11F did not materialize. In December 2010 the only aircraft of the airline was stored at Mumbai International Airport and the airline had ceased operations.

== Destinations ==
Belgium

- Brussels - Brussels Airport

Hong Kong

- Hong Kong - Hong Kong International Airport

India

- Mumbai - Indira Gandhi International Airport Hub

South Korea

- Seoul - Incheon International Airport

Thailand

- Bangkok - Suvarnabhumi Airport

== Fleet ==
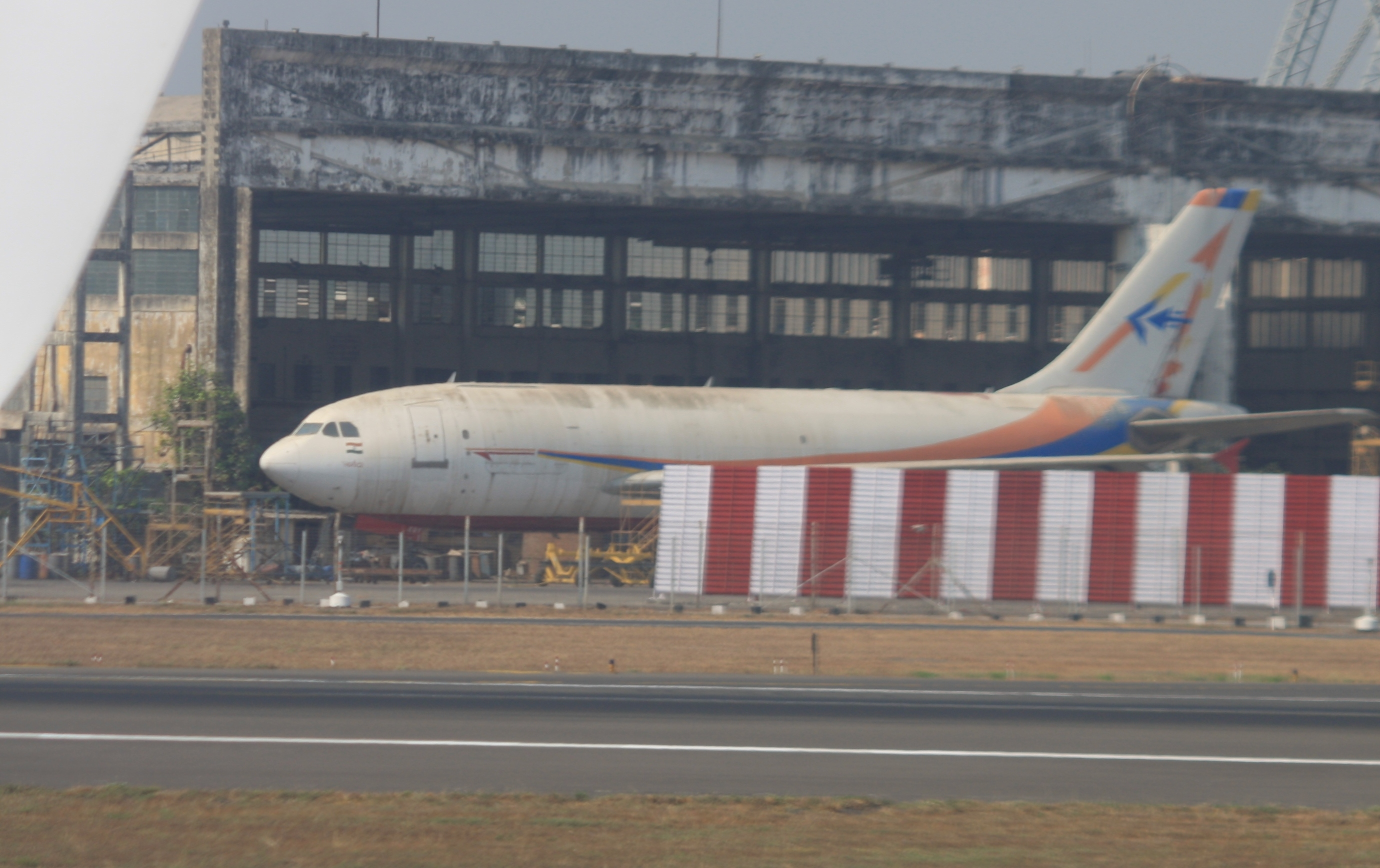
The airline's sole aircraft in storage at Mumbai in 2014

Aryan Cargo Express operated the following aircraft (as of December 2010):

Aryan Cargo Express fleet
Aircraft	In service	Orders	Notes
Airbus A310-300F	1	—	Leased from Air India
Total	1	—	

== See also ==
- List of defunct airlines of India
