= Supreme Airlines =

Regional airline of Rajasthan, India

IATA	ICAO	Call sign
—	—	—
- Founded: 1983; 43 years ago
- Commenced operations: 12 September 2016; 10 years ago
- Ceased operations: April 2018; 8 years ago
- Operating bases: Jaipur International Airport
- Fleet size: 5
- Destinations: 11
- Key people: Ammeet K Agarwal (CEO & President)
- Website: supremeairlines.com

Supreme Airlines was a private non-scheduled airline, with bases in Jaipur and Ahmedabad. It operated 18 daily flights between 11 cities under an agreement with the State Govt of Rajasthan. Between 4th October 2016 and 7th August 2018, Supreme Airlines hauled 20,625 passengers in 4,167 flights, with 2,000+ tones of cargo. Supreme Airlines has sued the Ministry of Civil Aviation, D.G.C.A. and Airports Authority of India for Rs. 40+ Crores.

== Destinations ==
Supreme Airlines was flying to the following destinations as of April 2019.

Country	State	City	Airport	Notes
India	Rajasthan	Jaipur	Jaipur International Airport	
India	Rajasthan	Jodhpur	Jodhpur Airport	
India	Rajasthan	Sri Ganganagar	Lalgarh Airport	
India	Rajasthan	Udaipur	Puttaparthi Airport	
India	Rajasthan	Bikaner	Bikaner Airport	
India	Rajasthan	Kota	Kota Airport	
India	Rajasthan	Jaisalmer	Jaisalmer Airport	
India	Rajasthan	Kishangarh	Kishangarh Airport	
India	Gujarat	Ahmedabad	Sardar Vallabhbhai Patel International Airport	
India	Uttar Pradesh	Agra	Agra Airport	
India	New Delhi	New Delhi	Indira Gandhi International Airport	

== Fleet ==
Supreme Airlines fleet
Aircraft	In service	Orders	Passengers	Notes
Aircraft	In service	Orders	Y	Notes
Cessna 208B Grand Caravan	2010	VT-SAI	9	
Cessna 208B Grand Caravan	2013	VT-UDN	9	
Cessna 172SP Skyhawk	2007	N106KA	3	
Cessna 172SP Skyhawk	2007	N286SA	3	
Diamond 20C1	2007	N340JA	1	
Total	-	—		
