= Air Services of India =

Air Services of India was a private airline based at Juhu Aerodrome in Mumbai, India that operated from 1936 to 1953.

== History Of Aeroplane Service ==
The airline was formed in 1936 (90 years ago) and initially served routes on the Kathiawar Peninsula and to Poona. with aircraft like the de Havilland Dragonfly, Airspeed Courier, Percival Vega Gulls and de Havilland Fox Moth. In the beginning of 1939, it opened a new line between Kolhapur and the Juhu Aerodrome. The thrice-a-week service was officially inaugurated by the Maharaja of Kolhapur, who showed considerable interest in the project and subsidised the service and built an airport at Kolhapur.

In 1941, Air Services of India was purchased by The Scindia Steam Navigation Company Ltd. and became known as the Scindia line. Services resumed on 3 May 1946 after World War II with a small fleet of De Havilland Dragon Rapides and 11 former United States Air Force Douglas C-47 Skytrains converted for civilian use. Air Services of India was the only airline using the French-built Sud-Ouest Corse for civilian purposes, having two of them in their fleet. By 1953, when the Air Corporations Act was passed, it had an extensive network from Cochin to Lucknow and became Line 7 of the Indian Airlines Corporation.

The airline was merged into the Indian Airlines Corporation in 1953 (73 years ago).

== Destinations ==
Air Services of India served cities mostly in the Western regions of British India including Karachi which is now in Pakistan.

- India
  - Gujarat
    - Bhavnagar - Bhavnagar Airport
    - Bhuj - Bhuj Airport
    - Jamnagar - Jamnagar Airport
    - Keshod - Keshod Airport
    - Porbandar - Porbandar Airport
    - Rajkot - Rajkot Airport
  - Karnataka
    - Bangalore - Bangalore Airport
    - Belgaum - Belgaum Airport
  - Kerala
    - Kochi - Willingdon Island Airport
  - Madhya Pradesh
    - Indore - Devi Ahilyabai Holkar Airport
    - Gwalior - Gwalior Airport
  - Maharashtra
    - Mumbai - Juhu Aerodrome Hub
    - Pune - Pune International Airport
  - Uttar Pradesh
    - Kanpur - Kanpur Airport
    - Lucknow - Amausi International Airport
- Pakistan
    - Karachi - Karachi Airport

== Incidents and Accidents ==
On 25 January 1950, a C-47 (VT-CPQ), carrying cargo crashed on take-off at Shella Airport. There were no casualties.

On 9 May 1953, a C-47 (VT-AXD), crashed on take-off at the Juhu Aerodrome causing the aircraft to be written off. The undercarriage was retracted before the aircraft became airborne on its takeoff roll causing the aircraft to drop back on its belly. There were no casualties.
