= Lalgarh Airport =

Airport of Rajasthan, India

Sri Ganganagar Airport
- IATA: none; ICAO: none

Summary
- Airport type: Public
- Operator: Rajasthan Government
- Serves: Sri Ganganagar
- Location: Sri Ganganagar, India
- Elevation AMSL: 178 m / 584 ft
- Coordinates: 29°50′59″N 074°01′28″E

Map
- Location of the airport in Rajasthan Sri Ganganagar Airport (India)

Runways
Direction	Length		Surface
Direction	m	ft	Surface
06/24	1,300	4,266	Asphalt

Sri Ganganagar Airport is located at Lalgarh jattan, 20 kilometres South-East of Sri Ganganagar, in the state of Rajasthan, India. It is owned and operated by the State Government of Rajasthan. The airport is spread over 65 acres, has a 1300 metre long runway and a 4410 square metre apron for two small aircraft. A 125 square metre rest house serves as a terminal building.

The district administration plans to expand the airport at a cost of 28.5 crore to enable the operation of larger aircraft. The State Civil Aviation Department signed a memorandum of understanding (MoU) with the Indian Army in November 2017, allowing the Army to use the airstrip for 10 years.
