= Mistri Airways =

Mistri Airways, later known as Indian Overseas Airlines, is a defunct airline, which was based in India.

The airline started operations in 1946 (80 years ago) using Douglas DC-3s and later also ordered for a Martin 2-0-2.

The airline was started by one 29-year-old Parsi businessman, Rusi Mistri, who owned his personal Beech D17S.

Mistri Airways operated flights between Mumbai, Nagpur and Calcutta, in addition to charter work. In 1947, it changed its name to Indian Overseas Airlines. In 1949, it also got license to operate flights for air-mail services and also started operating on other routes like Nagpur -Hyderabad -Bangalore - Madras and Nagpur- Jabalpur - Allahbad -Kanpur -Lukhnow. The night air mail services' first license was granted to Indian Overseas Airlines but the airline closed by end of year 1950 (76 years ago) due to financial problems.
