= Premier Airways =

Premier Airways Limited
- Founded: August 2005; 20 years ago
- Headquarters: Chennai, Tamil Nadu
- Key people: Umapathy Pinaghapani, CMD

Premier Airways Limited was a planned low-cost, high-quality airline based in Chennai, Tamil Nadu, India. It had proposed to launch low-cost regional scheduled services, for which it received a No Objection Certificate (NOC) from the Ministry of Civil Aviation in July 2014.

The Public Limited company was founded in August 2005 by a group of Non Resident Indian (NRI) entrepreneurs.

Premier Airways Ltd, was promoted by US-based Umapathy Pinaghapani, and was to be a low-cost carrier similar to Southwest Airlines and IndiGo. The airline planned to purchase 40 Airbus A320neo aircraft worth $4.3 billion and aimed to start in the last quarter of 2015 or the first quarter of 2016 with leased aircraft. The NOC expired before the airline could start operations. Despite all the challenges caused by vested corporate rivalries, Premier Airways is poised to revive in 2025.
