= Chhattisgarh Air Link =

IATA	ICAO	Call sign
—	—	—
- Commenced operations: December 2012; 13 years ago
- Ceased operations: before April 2019; 7 years ago
- Operating bases: Swami Vivekananda Airport (Raipur)
- Fleet size: 8
- Headquarters: Raipur
- Website: cgairlink.com (defunct)

Chhattisgarh Air link was a private non-scheduled airline based in Chhattisgarh, India. It was a subsidiary of Chhattisgarh Aviation Academy. It flew non-scheduled and scheduled flights operated on a charter and individual ticket basis. The airline started operations in December 2012. As of April 2019, the airline's website is defunct.

== Destinations ==
The airline flew to the following destinations-

- Raipur – Swami Vivekananda Airport (Base)
- Jamshedpur – Sonari Airport
- Bhubaneshwar – Biju Patnaik International Airport
- Rourkela – Rourkela Airport
- Jharsuguda – Jharsuguda Airport
- Bilaspur – Bilaspur Airport
- Raigarh – Raigarh Airport
- Jagdalpur – Jagdalpur Airport

== Fleet ==
Chhattishgarh Airlink's fleet consists of:

Aircraft	In fleet	Passengers
Fixed wing c-90	1	6/8
Islander BN2T	2	8
Bell 412	2	8/10/12
Bell 407	3	6
Total	8	
