= Damania Airways =

Indian airline

Damania Airways LTD.
IATA	ICAO	Call sign
D2	DAM	—
- Founded: 1992; 34 years ago
- Commenced operations: 1993; 33 years ago
- Ceased operations: 1997; 29 years ago
- Hubs: Chhatrapati Shivaji International Airport
- Fleet size: 5
- Headquarters: Vakola, Bombay
- Key people: Parvez Damania, Vispi Damania

Damania Airways was an Indian airline headquartered in Mumbai that operated from 1993 to 1997. It was founded by brothers Parvez and Vispi Damania. Parvez later played a vital role for Sahara India Pariwar in their venture Air Sahara and then went on to become the Executive Director of Kingfisher Airlines. Vispi later became the VP of Finance at Kingfisher Airlines.

== History ==
Damania Airways was founded in 1992 and began flying on 10 March 1993 with two Boeing 737 aircraft leased from TAP Air Portugal. With its base in Bombay, the airline had a regular schedule of flights to Delhi, Calcutta, Madras, Bangalore, Goa and Indore. An additional two aircraft were leased later.

This was an extremely competitive period for domestic Indian aviation as the domestic aviation sector had been reopened to private participation after many decades, and the government-owned monopoly of Indian Airlines ceased. The government designated the new airlines as 'air taxis.' Some of the prominent airlines of that time were Jet Airways, East-West, ModiLuft, and Continental.

Parvez Damania's intention to bring an international standard of flying to domestic Indian aviation made the airline a big draw among domestic flyers. The airline was extremely successful and its superior in-flight service soon became the standard for domestic Indian aviation. By the end of 1993, the airline had carried over 200,000 passengers even though they accounted for just two per cent of traffic. In 1994, the Indian Government granted scheduled domestic airline status to nine private air-taxi operators including Damania Airways. Damania Airways was the first domestic airline to utilise permission granted by the Aviation Ministry and offer alcohol in-flight.

In 1995, under pressure from Indian Airlines to ensure a level playing field, the Aviation Ministry mandated that the private airlines must fly a certain number of flights on secondary routes to qualify to fly the major, profitable routes. The Aviation Ministry also delayed approvals to the private airlines to obtain smaller aircraft for the secondary routes. This completely altered the financials of flying and many airlines succumbed to the impossible stipulations. Damania Airways' superior draw helped the airline stay aloft for longer than most other airlines, but the delay in permissions to bring in smaller aircraft and the restrictions of destinations became a punishing two-pronged pressure.

The Chennai-based Khemka-owned NEPC group, promoters of the Skyline NEPC airline, acquired management control of the airline in May 1995. Skyline NEPC's existing fleet was composed entirely of Fokker turboprop aircraft and their network covered only small towns. This fleet profile, when combined with the 737 fleet of Damania Airways, would have allowed the airline to claim credit for the flights flown between the secondary towns while reserving the 737 jets for the major cities. With a view to capitalising on the Damania Airways brand draw, Skyline NEPC flew the Damania Airways aircraft with the original Damania Airways livery. Within a few months, the entire airline was renamed Skyline NEPC.
NEPC Airlines and its subsidiary, Skyline NEPC, were grounded 2 years later in 1997. The International Air Transport Association (IATA) suspended them for non-payment of dues, following which they were taken off the computerised reservation system (CRS).
