= Lalgarh Jattan =

Village in Sri Ganganagar, Rajasthan, India

Lalgarh Jattan The Red City
- Municipality
- Nickname: Lalgarh
- Location in Rajasthan, India
- Coordinates: 29.84094°N 74.02602°E
- Country: India
- State: Rajasthan
- District: Sri Ganganagar
- Established: 1902
- Founder: Lal Singh (Villager)
- Named for: Lal Singh (Villager)

Government
  - Type: State Government
  - Body: Government of India

Area
  - Total: 520 km^{2} (200 sq mi)
- Elevation: 164 m (538 ft)

Population (20 march 2023)
  - Total: 1.1500 cr
  - Rank: N/A

Languages
  - Official: Hindi
- Time zone: UTC+5:30 (IST)
- PIN: 335037
- Telephone code: 01503
- Website: Official website (2017 archive)

Lalgarh Jattan is a municipality located in India, in the district of Sri Ganganagar and state Rajasthan. According to the 2011 total population calculation of 8LLG, Lalgarh has the highest population in the district of Sri Ganganagar, with a total of 11,361 residents and 2,380 homes. Lalgarh's 2010 total vote calculation was 8500, and the village's total female population is 2,300.

== History ==
Lalgarh Jattan is a municipality in Sri Ganganagar district of Rajasthan, established approximately two hundred years ago. After some time, in 1902, Haryanvi people came to the village. Because they were Jats, the village took the name "Lalgarh Jattan". At the time, the villager life cycle was very short due to the limited resources of the area. There was very little water for drinking. In 1961 this village connected to a link road. In 1964, a local water system was created. In 1968, the first bus was run between Sriganganagar to Hanumangarh. Electricity came in 1964 and a post office opened in 1950. In 1976, the post office branch changed into a sub post office. On 31 January 1972, the state banks of Bikaner and Jaipur opened branches there, followed by the first The Ganganagar kendriya Sahakari Bank, opened in 1982.

== Culture ==
The population of Lalgarh Jattan predominantly consists of the elderly. The most common languages in the village are Baagri (rajasthani) and Hindi. Many members of the village's working class are engaged in fieldwork or other areas. The population is also generally religious, the predominant religion being Hinduism, although traditional temples and prayers are present as well. The village currently has a birth-based caste system which does not restrict one's profession.
