= Air Carnival =

Indian airline based in Coimbatore

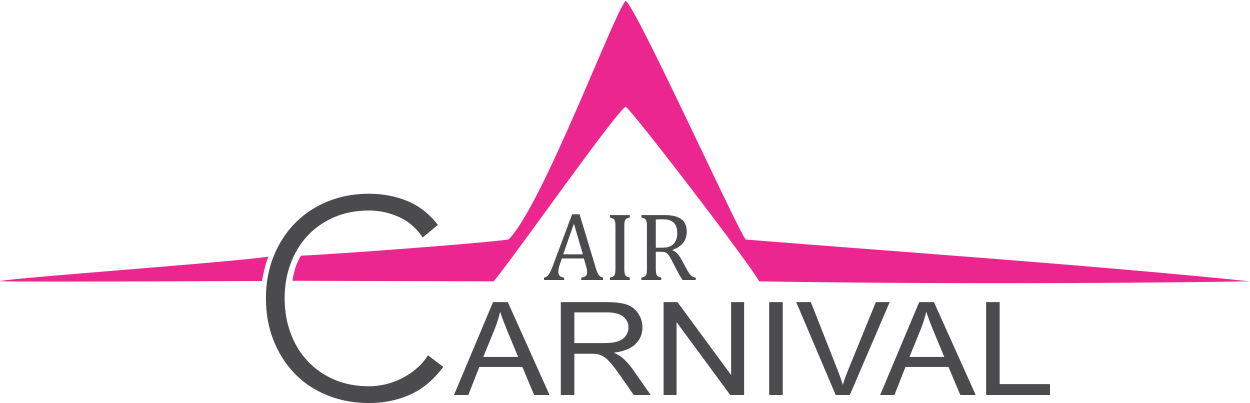
IATA	ICAO	Call sign
2S	ACV	CARNAIR
- Founded: 2013; 13 years ago
- Commenced operations: 18 July 2016; 10 years ago
- Ceased operations: 6 April 2017; 9 years ago
- Operating bases: Coimbatore International Airport
- Hubs: Chennai International Airport
- Fleet size: 1 (March 2017)
- Destinations: 4 (March 2017)
- Headquarters: Coimbatore, Tamil Nadu, India
- Key people: Manish Kumar Singh, CEO; S. I. Nathan, founder and Chairman
- Website: aircarnival.in(defunct)

Air Carnival was an Indian regional airline based at Coimbatore International Airport with a hub at Chennai International Airport. Air Carnival was promoted by the Coimbatore Marine College (CMC) Group. It was founded in 2013 as a charter airline but transitioned to scheduled operations within South India, which were launched in July 2016.

The airline ceased operations on 6 April 2017. The Indian Directorate General of Civil Aviation suspended its air operator's permit in June 2017. In November 2017, the Chennai bench of the National Company Law Tribunal (NCLT) ordered the corporate insolvency resolution process against the airline and ordered liquidation of the company in January 2019.

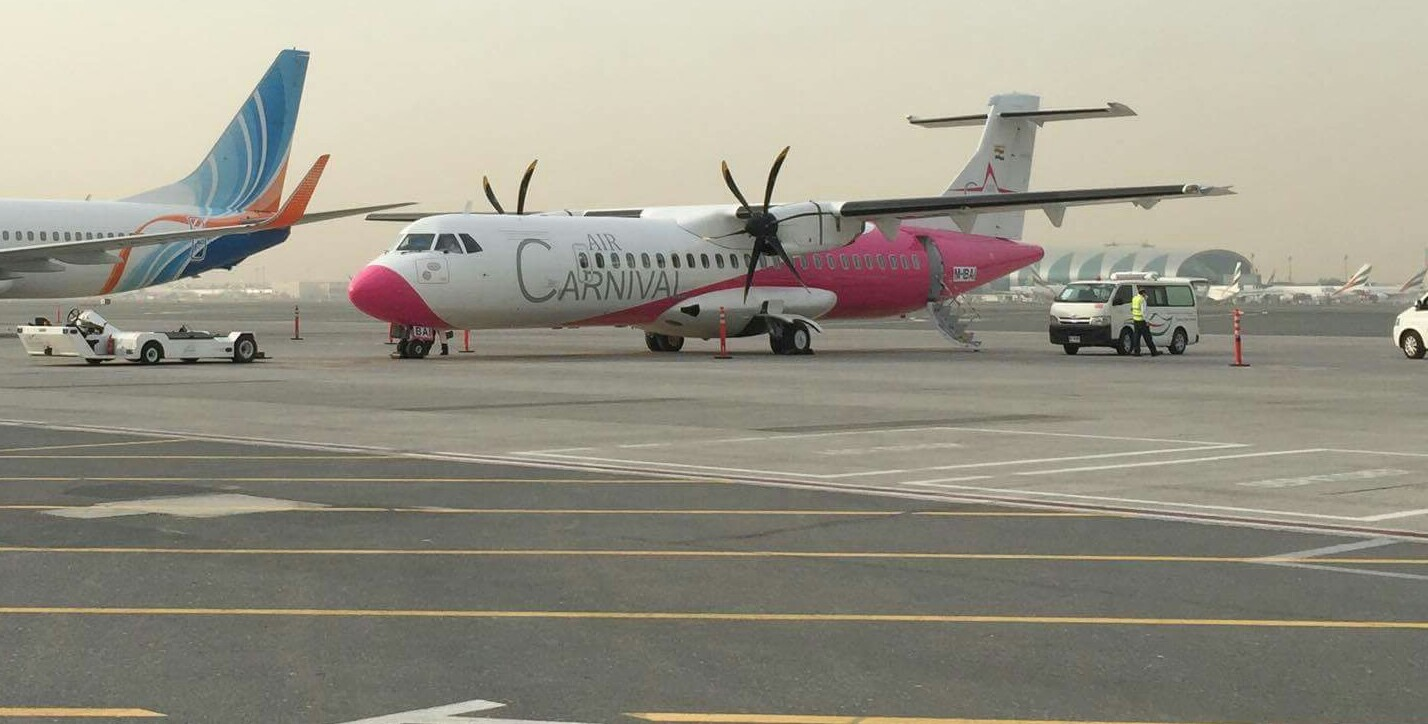
An Air Carnival ATR 72-500 at Dubai International Airport awaiting delivery

== History ==
The company was founded in 2013 by S.I. Nathan of the CMC group, as Air Carnival Charter Services, a charter airline based in Delhi. The group later shifted the focus of Air Carnival to short-haul routes within South India. Coimbatore was selected as the base for its aircraft in order to offer optimum flight timings to the city's business community.

Manish Kumar Singh was chief executive officer; and S. I. Nathan, who is also the director of CMC Group, was the founder and chairman.

The airline was positioned as a small-town carrier, with a fleet of two aircraft. The plan was to operate on short-haul routes where it could fly profitably with a focus on unserved and poorly served markets. The airline received its no-objection certificate from the Directorate General of Civil Aviation in June 2014 to operate on regional routes in South India. Air Carnival received its first aircraft, an ATR 72-500, in April 2016 and its air operator's certificate in July 2016. The airline commenced operations on 18 July 2016 with a flight from Coimbatore to Chennai.

The promoters ran into funding issues within nine months of operations. Efforts to acquire two more aircraft did not materialise as promoters failed to raise funds. The promoters attempted to sell their stake in the airline in April 2017. However, by then the airline had ceased operations after the airline's engineers demanding wages went on a two-day strike, resulting in the grounding of its lone aircraft. The Directorate General of Civil Aviation suspended Carnival's air operator's certificate in June 2017 after the airline failed to satisfy the regulator in its response to a show-cause notice.

In November 2017, the Chennai bench of the NCLT ordered the corporate insolvency resolution process against the airline and, after finding no investors to revive the airline, ordered liquidation of the company in January 2019.

== Destinations ==
Air Carnival was flying to the following destinations in India prior to ceasing operations:

State	City	Airport	Notes
Tamil Nadu	Chennai	Chennai International Airport	
Tamil Nadu	Coimbatore	Coimbatore International Airport	—
Tamil Nadu	Tuticorin	Tuticorin Airport	—
Tamil Nadu	Tiruchirappalli	Tiruchirappalli International Airport	—

== Fleet ==
Prior to ceasing operations, Air Carnival operated a single ATR 72-500

== See also ==
- List of airlines of India
