= Himalayan Aviation =

Indian airline

Himalayan Aviation हिमालयन एविएशन
- Founded: 1948; 78 years ago
- Ceased operations: 1953; 73 years ago (Indian Airlines merger)
- Headquarters: Calcutta, India

Himalayan Aviation (Hindi: हिमालयन एविएशन) was an airline based in India that operated in the northern parts of the Indian subcontinent until its nationalisation and merger into Indian Airlines in 1953.

== History ==
On 20 February 1950, Himalayan Aviation ran the first ever international flight from Nepal, from Gauchar, Nepal, to Calcutta, India.

Himalayan Aviation began with chartered flights. Over time, it expanded to night-mail services and scheduled passenger flights. In order to maximize revenue, it began taking on passengers on its night-mail flights as well.

On 7 December 1951, Pakistan detained a Himalayan Aviation flight from Ahmedabad, India, to Kabul, Afghanistan, at the stopover point in Karachi. Pakistan had previously denied use of the direct Delhi-Kabul air-corridor that overflew the North West Frontier Province. India and Pakistan had worked out an alternative Ahmadabad-Karachi-Zahedan (Iran)-Kabul route.

== Fleet ==
The fleet mostly consisted of Douglas DC-3 aircraft.
