= Deccan Airways =

Airline based in Hyderabad, India

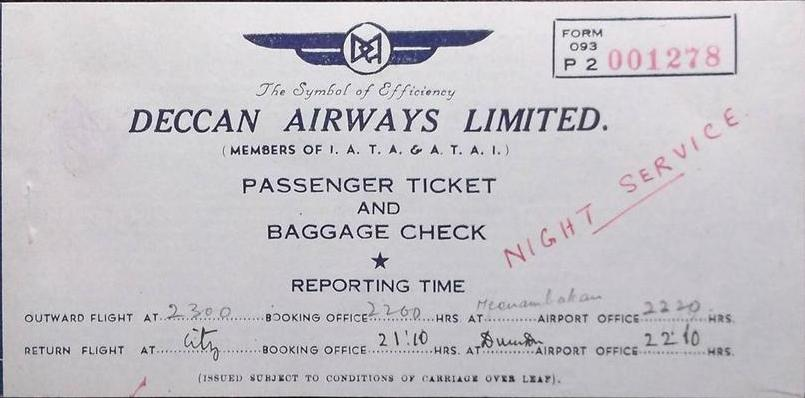
- Founded: September 1945; 81 years ago
- Commenced operations: July 1946; 80 years ago
- Ceased operations: 1953; 73 years ago
- Hubs: Begumpet Airport
- Headquarters: Hyderabad

Deccan Airways Limited was a commercial airline based at Begumpet Airport in the former Hyderabad State in India. It was owned by the Nizam of Hyderabad and Tata Airlines.

== History ==
Founded in 1945, Deccan was one of the nine airlines that existed in India during independence. The airline was a joint venture of Nizam Government of the Hyderabad State and Tata Airlines. 71% of Deccan Airways was owned by the Nizam's Government and the rest by Tata Sons and others. Commercial operations were launched with a fleet of three aircraft in July 1946, operating a biweekly service between Madras and Delhi via Hyderabad, Nagpur, Bhopal, and Gwalior. It also flew a biweekly Hyderabad-Bangalore flight. By March 1947, the airline had seven aircraft in its fleet and was operating the Madras-Delhi flight daily as well as a daily Hyderabad-Bombay flight. Between July 1946 and May 1947, the airline had carried more than eleven thousand passengers, 51 tonnes of freight, and almost seven tonnes of mail.

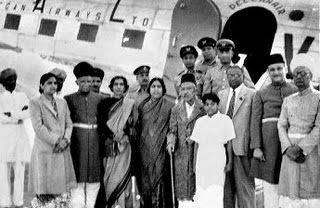
The seventh Nizam, Mir Osman Ali Khan, along with some aides takes his first ride in a Deccan Airways Dakota from Begumpet airport

== Post-Annexation ==
After the September 1948 Operation Polo, a military operation through which India annexed Hyderabad State, the airline was owned by the Government of India. By 1952, the Government of India held 78% of the shares of Deccan Airways. The shares were acquired from the Hyderabad Government & Nizam State Railways. 13% of the shares was still held by Tatas & 9% by the general public.

== Nationalisation ==
In 1953, Deccan Airways Limited, along with seven other airlines under the Air Corporations Act, were merged to form a single domestic carrier, Indian Airlines. On 10 October 1953, Deccan Airways resigned its associate membership of IATA.

== Fleet ==
When Deccan was merged with Indian Airlines in 1953, it had a fleet of thirteen Douglas DC-3 'Dakota' aircraft. The DC-3 aircraft were brought from US Air Force at a throw away price after they were left unused in Assam after World War II.

== Accidents and incidents ==
- 5 April 1950: A Deccan Airways C-47A (registration VT-CJD) crashed at Hatiara while attempting to return to Dum Dum Airport after an engine failed, killing all three crew;
- 21 November 1951: A Deccan Airways C-47A (registration VT-AUO) crashed near Dum Dum Airport while attempting to land in extremely poor visibility conditions, killing all four crew and 12 of 13 passengers.
- 19 February 1952: A Deccan Airways C-47A (registration VT-AXE) crashed on landing at Sonegaon Airport due to pilot error and possible misread altimeter, killing three of 16 on board.
- 30 April 1952: A Deccan Airways C-47A (registration VT-AUN) crashed at Safdarjung Airport, Delhi, due to engine failure, killing four crew and five passengers.

== See also ==
- Category:Establishments in Hyderabad State
