= Keshod Airport =

Domestic airport in Keshod, Gujarat, India

- IATA: IXK; ICAO: VAKS

Summary
- Airport type: Public
- Operator: Airports Authority of India
- Serves: Junagadh, Keshod and Veraval
- Location: Keshod, Gujarat, India
- Elevation AMSL: 167 ft (51 m)
- Coordinates: 21°19′01″N 070°16′13″E
- Website: Keshod Airport

Map
- Location within Gujarat Location within India

Runways
Direction	Length		Surface
Direction	ft	m	Surface
05/23	4,500	1,372	Asphalt

Statistics (April 2025 – March 2026)
- Passengers: 4,798 (▼75.2%)
- Aircraft movements: 428 (▼19.5%)
- Cargo tonnage: 0 ( 0%)
- Source: AAI

Keshod Airport (IATA: IXK, ICAO: VAKS) is a domestic airport serving the cities of Junagadh, Keshod and Veraval in the state of Gujarat, India. Spread over an area of 450 acres, it is located at Keshod, 39 km (24 mi) south-west of Junagadh, 4 km (2.5 mi) north-east of Keshod and 50 km (31 mi) north of Veraval.

== History ==
The airport was built by the Nawab of Junagadh, Mahabatkhanji III, for his private use, by acquiring land from the Kotadias and Vanpariya's Patel community in the early 1930s. The airport was refurbished and revived in the late 1980s to facilitate scheduled operations. The last airline to fly here was Jet Airways, which ceased flying in 2000. It hosted its last scheduled commercial flight in October 2000. After the launch of the government's UDAN Scheme, the airport was selected to develop it as a commercial airport, and after the completion of the passenger terminal, apron, runway, and necessary facilities, it began commercial operations from 12 March 2022, after the Directorate General of Civil Aviation (DGCA) granted license for the airport to start operations in March 2021, with Alliance Air operating regular flights to Mumbai.

== Upgrade ==
The Gujarat State Government signed a memorandum of understanding (MOU) with Airports Authority of India (AAI) in December 2023, agreeing to provide 205 Acres for the development of Keshod Airport.

AAI invited tenders for the civil construction contract of Phase 1 in December 2024. Twenty six firms submitted bids. The redevelopment is estimated to cost Rs. 363 crore and includes the construction of a 6500 square metre new terminal building, expansion of its existing runway to 2500 metres x 45 metres, construction of a new air traffic control (ATC) tower and an apron to handle up to 3 Airbus A320/ Boeing B737 narrow-body aircraft. In Phase 1, Runway 05/23 will be strengthened and extended. A link taxiway, a 701 metre long Parallel Taxi Track, an apron, an isolation bay, a perimeter road, and an operational boundary wall will also be constructed as part of Phase 1. The expansion is expected to be completed by January 2027.

== Airlines and destinations ==
Airlines	Destinations
Alliance Air	Ahmedabad, Diu, Mumbai, Porbandar,

== See also ==
- List of airports in Gujarat
