= Indian Airlines =

Airline of India (1953–2011)

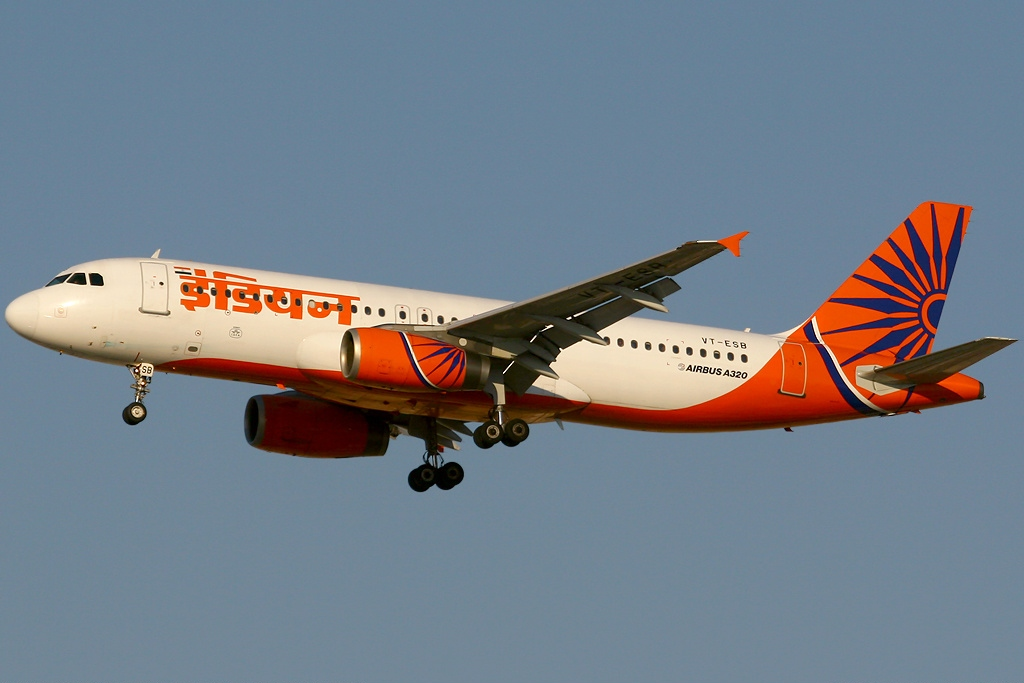
- An Indian Airlines Airbus A320-200
IATA	ICAO	Call sign
IC	IAC	INDAIR
- Founded: 1953; 73 years ago
- Commenced operations: 1 August 1953; 73 years ago
- Ceased operations: 27 February 2011; 15 years ago (Air India merger)
- Hubs: Mumbai; Delhi
- Secondary hubs: Bangalore; Chennai; Thiruvananthapuram; Kolkata
- Focus cities: Ahmedabad; Hyderabad; Kochi
- Frequent-flyer program: Flying Returns; InterMiles
- Fleet size: 55
- Destinations: 63
- Parent company: Air India Limited
- Headquarters: New Delhi
- Key people: Rajiv Bansal (Chief Managing Director)
- Website: airindia.com

Indian Airlines was a state-owned airline in India that later became a division of Air India Limited before ultimately ceasing operations. It was based in Delhi and focused primarily on domestic routes, along with several international services to neighbouring countries in Asia and limited flights to the Middle East and Southeast Asia. It was a division of Air India Limited after the merger of eight pre-Independence domestic airlines.

On 10 December 2005, the airline was rebranded as Indian for advertising purposes as a part of a program to revamp its image in preparation for an initial public offering (IPO). The airline operated closely with Air India, India's national overseas carrier. Alliance Air was a fully owned subsidiary of Indian Airlines.

In 2007, the Government of India announced that Indian Airlines would be merged into Air India Limited as its wholly owned subsidiary. As part of the merger process, a new company called the National Aviation Company of India Limited (now called Air India Limited) was established, into which both Air India (along with Air India Express) and Indian Airlines (along with Alliance Air) would be merged. Once the merger was completed on 26 February 2011, the airline – called Air India – would continue to be headquartered in Mumbai and would have a fleet of over 130 aircraft.

== History ==
=== Merger of regional airlines ===
Older orange logo of Indian Airlines until the 2005 rebrand

The airline was set up under the Air Corporations Act, 1953 with an initial capital of ₹32 million and started operations on 1 August 1953. It was established after legislation came into force to nationalise the entire airline industry in India. Two new national airlines were to be formed along the same lines as happened in the United Kingdom with British Overseas Airways Corporation (BOAC) and British European Airways (BEA). Air India took over international routes and Indian Airlines Corporation (IAC) took over the domestic and regional routes.

Eight pre-Independence domestic airlines, Deccan Airways, Airways India, Bharat Airways, Himalayan Aviation, Kalinga Airlines, Indian National Airways, Air Services of India and the domestic wing of Air India, were merged to form the new domestic national carrier Indian Airlines Corporation. International operations of Air India Ltd. was taken over by the newly formed Air India International. Indian Airlines Corporation inherited a fleet of 99 aircraft including 74 Douglas DC-3 Dakotas, 12 Vickers Vikings, 3 Douglas DC-4s and various smaller types from the seven airlines that made it up.

=== Early fleet ===
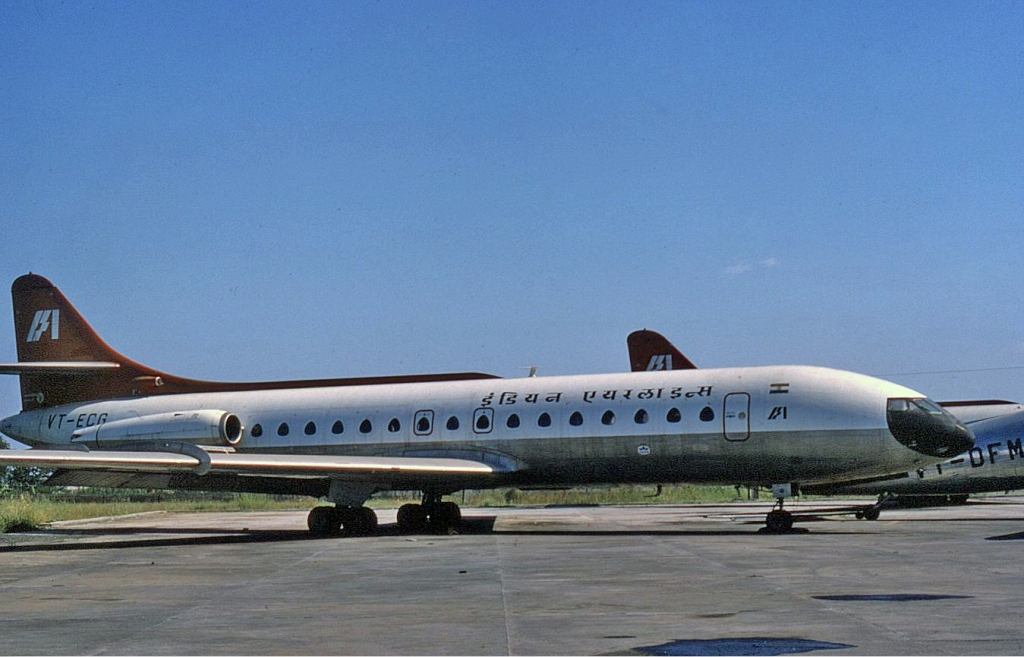
Indian Airlines Sud Aviation Caravelle III parked at Mumbai Airport

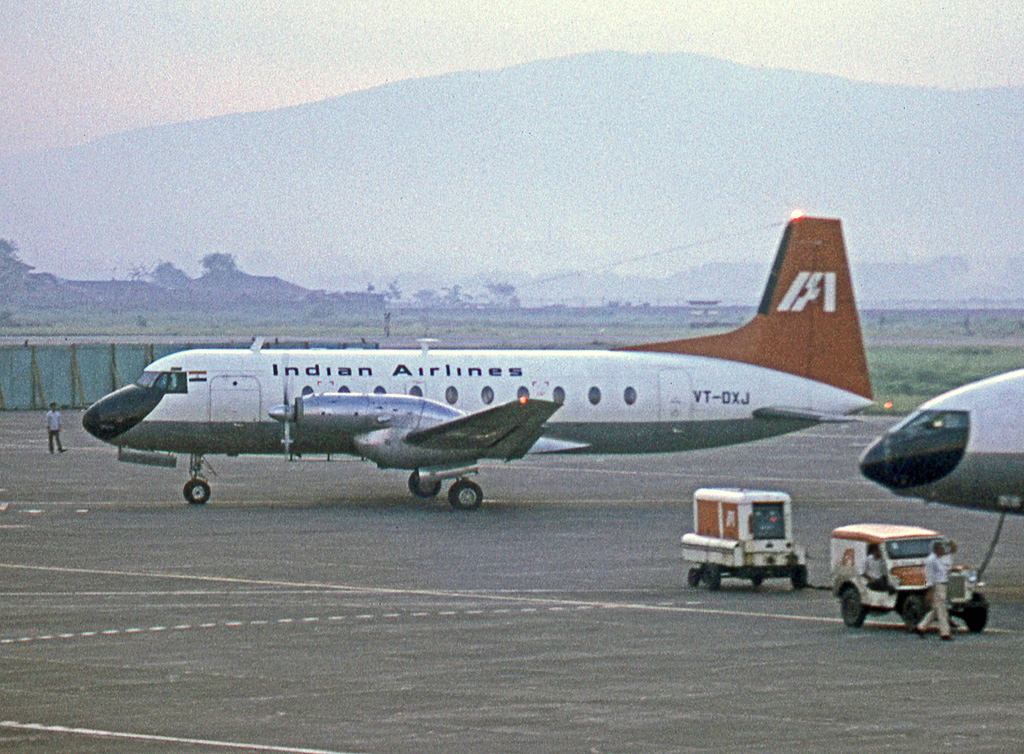
HS 748 built in India, operated by Indian Airlines, at Mumbai Airport in 1974

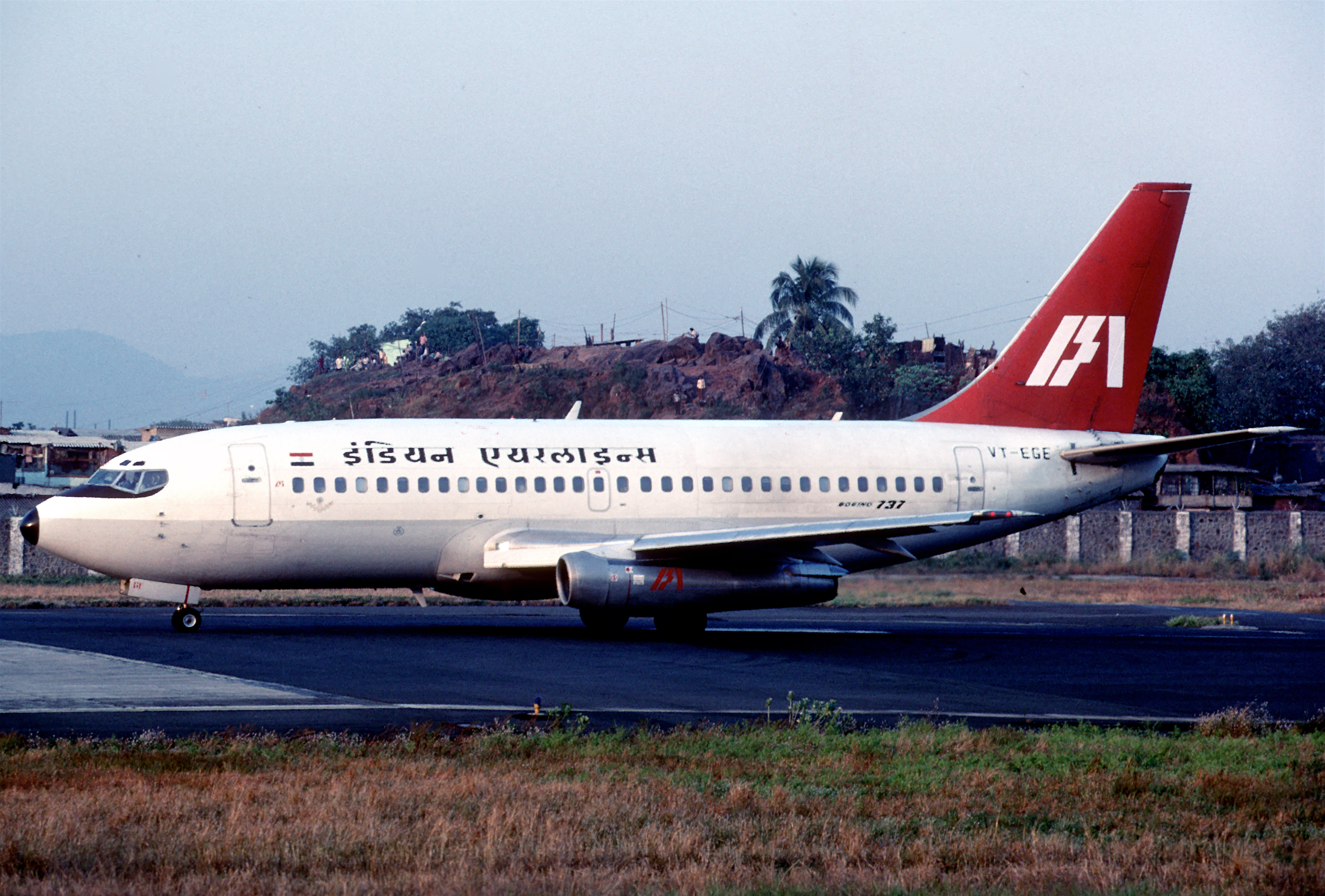
Indian Airlines Boeing 737-200 in 1998

Vickers Viscounts were introduced in 1957 with Fokker F27 Friendships being delivered from 1961. The 1960s also saw Hawker Siddeley HS 748s, manufactured in India by Hindustan Aeronautics Limited, join the fleet. The jet age began for IAC with the introduction of the pure-jet Sud Aviation Caravelle airliner in 1964, followed by Boeing 737-200s in the early 1970s. April 1976 saw the first three Airbus A300 wide-body jets being introduced. The regional airline, Vayudoot, which had been established in 1981, was later reintegrated. By 1988, Airbus A320-200s were introduced. The economic liberalisation process initiated by the Government of India in the early 1990s ended Indian Airlines' dominance of India's domestic air transport industry.

=== Post liberalisation ===
The Indian Government liberalised the private sector in Early 90s and with the emergence of new competitors, Indian Airlines faced tough competition from Jet Airways, Air Sahara, East-West Airlines, Skyline NEPC and ModiLuft. Yet, until 2005, Indian Airlines was the second-largest airline in India after Jet Airways while Air Sahara controlled 17% of the Indian aviation industry. During that time few other domestic carriers like East-West Airlines, Skyline NEPC and ModiLuft discontinued their flight operations.

Also, during 1993, another government-established regional feeder airline called Vayudoot was merged with Indian Airlines, but still operated as a standalone division until 1997 after which its entire flight operations were transferred to Indian Airlines and its employees absorbed into Indian Airlines and Air India.

=== Low-cost carrier era ===
Since 2003, the rise of low-cost domestic competitors Air Deccan, SpiceJet, IndiGo, GoAir and Kingfisher Airlines along with its low-cost arm Kingfisher Red led Indian Airlines to reduce airfares. However, as of 2006, Indian Airlines was still a profit-making airline; in fact during 2004–2005 it made a record profit of ₹656.1 million. Indian Airlines Limited was partly owned by the Government of India (51% of share capital) through a holding company and had 19,300 employees as of March 2007. Its annual turnover, together with that of its subsidiary Alliance Air, was well over ₹40 billions (around US$1 billion). Together with its subsidiary, Alliance Air, Indian Airlines carried a total of over 7.5 million passengers annually.

=== Air India merger ===
In 2007, the Government of India announced the merger of Air India and Indian Airlines. While Indian Airlines’ own branding was replaced with the Air India branding in the public eye by then, the "IC" and "IAC" codes of IATA and ICAO, respectively, and callsign "INDAIR" continued to be used on flights that were operated by the Airbus A320 family aircraft until 26 February 2011, when Indian Airlines ceased operating under its own codes and completed its merger with Air India.

The last plane to bear the final Indian Airlines livery, an Airbus A319 registered as VT-SCF was repainted in the Air India livery in 2018.

== Destinations ==
=== Codeshare agreements ===
Indian Airlines had codeshare agreements with the following airlines:

- Alliance Air
- GMG Airlines
- Gulf Air
- Uzbekistan Airways

== Fleet ==
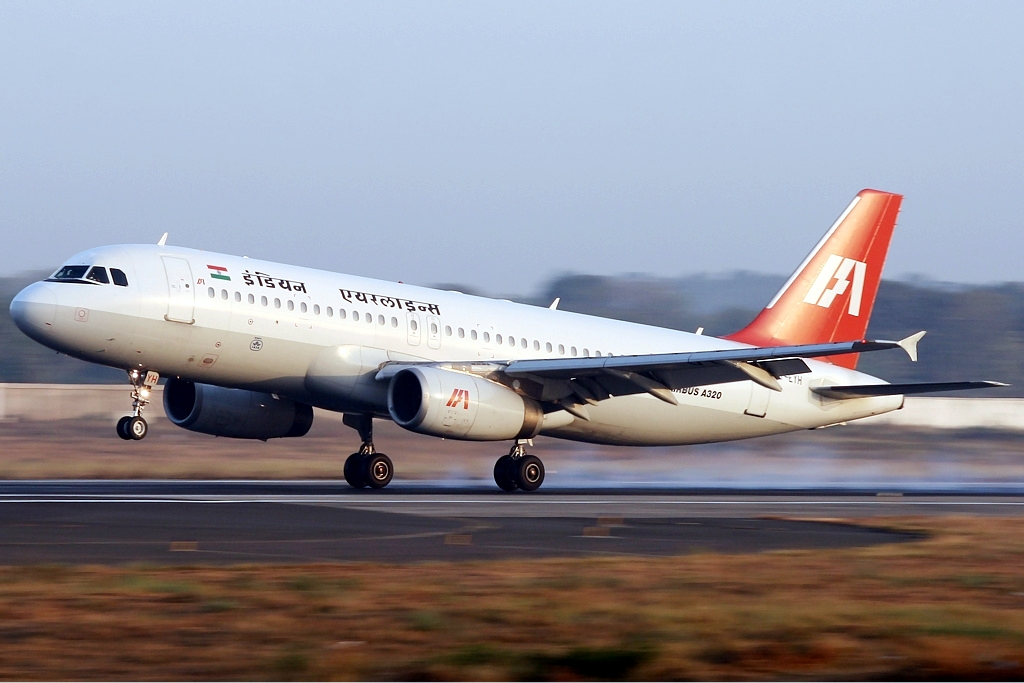
Indian Airlines Airbus A320-200 in its old livery

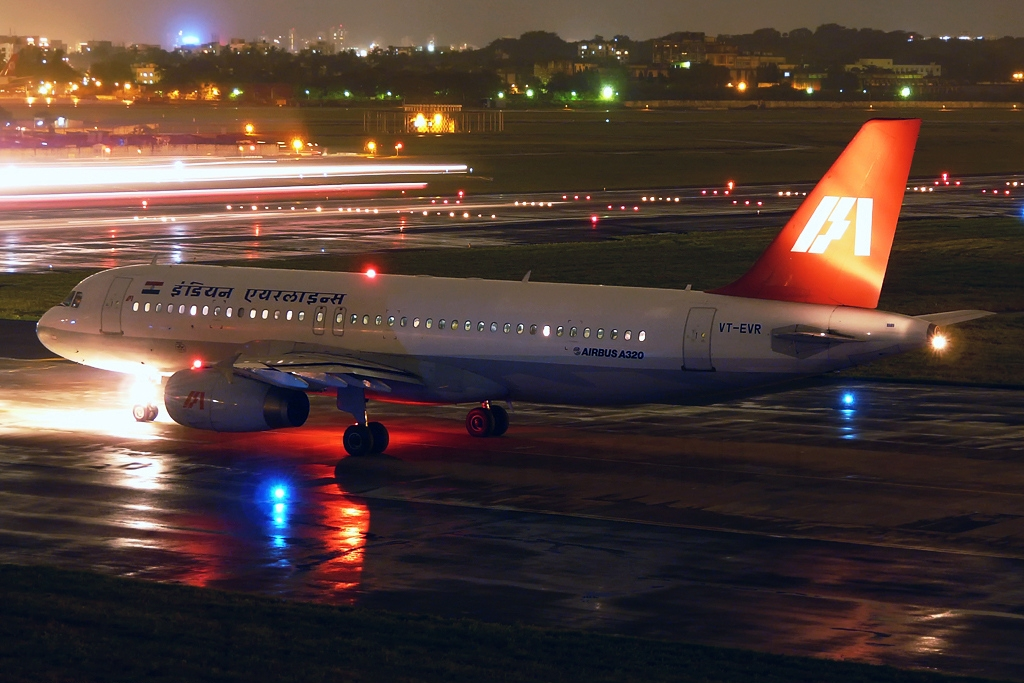
Indian Airlines Airbus A320-231 in its old livery at night

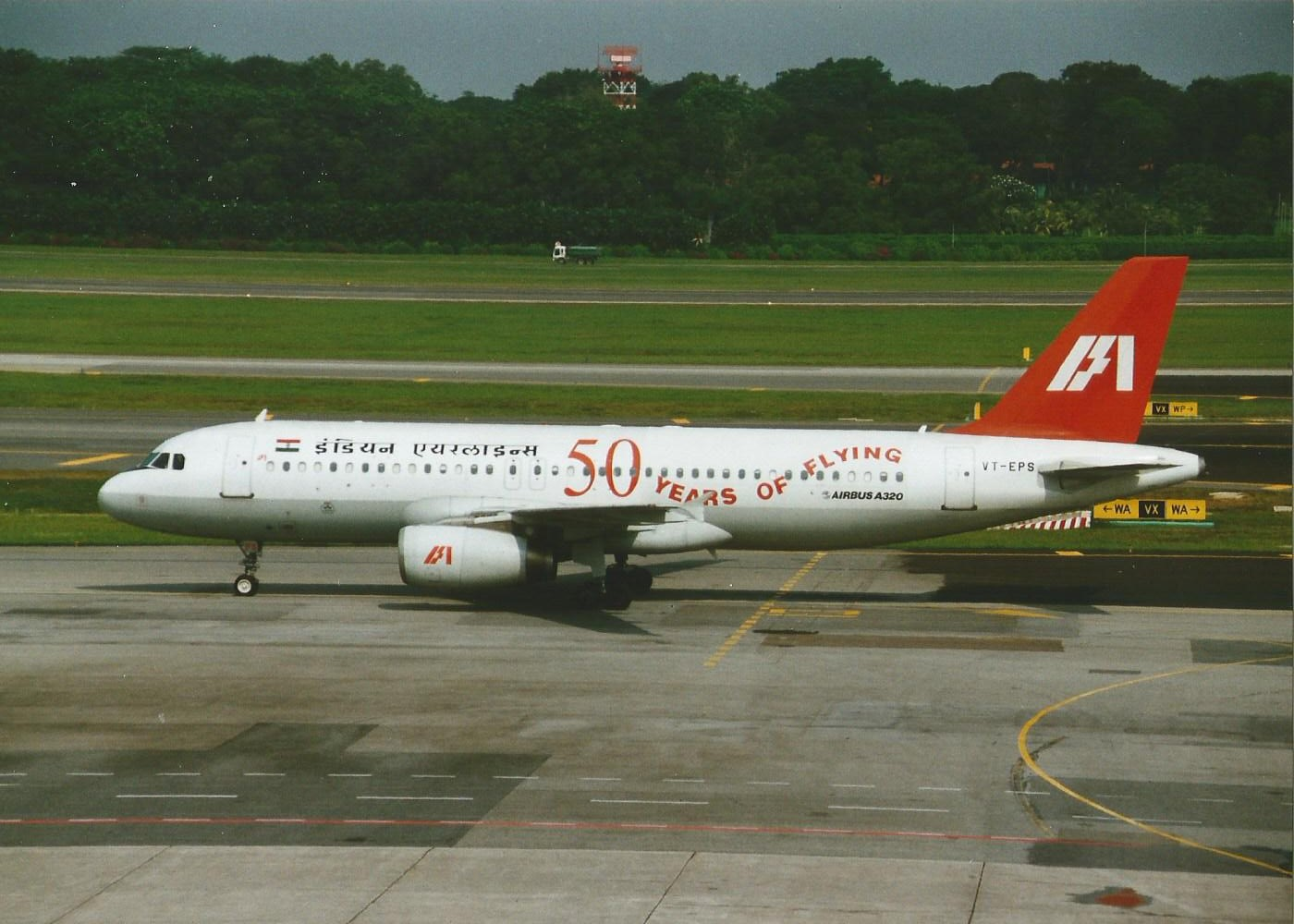
Indian Airlines 50th Anniversary livery in 2003

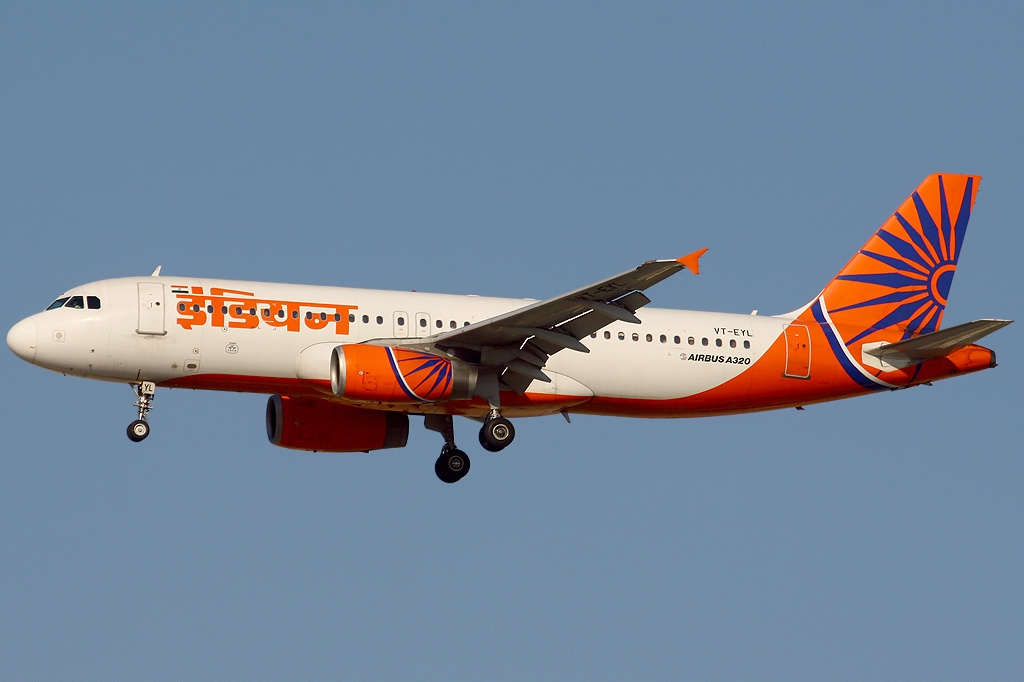
Indian Airlines Airbus A320-200 in the airline's final 2005 livery

As of 2007, Indian Airlines operated an all-Airbus A320 family fleet.

Indian Airlines fleet
Aircraft	In Service	Passengers			Notes
Aircraft	In Service	J	Y	Total	Notes
Airbus A319-100	6	14	106	120	Operated by NACIL
Airbus A319-100	6	8	114	122	Operated by NACIL
Airbus A319-100	6	—	144	144	Operated by NACIL
Airbus A320-200	49	20	126	146	
Airbus A321-200	2	20	152	172	In Air India livery
Total	57				

=== Former fleet ===
Indian Airlines former fleet
Aircraft	Total	Introduced	Retired	Notes
Airbus A300B2-100	10	1976	2003	
Airbus A300B4-200	4	1982	2008	
Beechcraft 17	1	1953	1968	
Beechcraft 18	1	1953	1957	
Boeing 737-200	31	1970	1999	
Boeing 737-200F	5	1980	2008	
de Havilland Heron	8	1955	1968	
Dornier 228	4	1997	2007	
Douglas C-47 Skytrain	53	1953	1978	
Douglas C-54 Skymaster	6	1953	1974	
Fokker F-27 Friendship	17	1961	1994	
Hawker Siddeley HS 748	19	1967	1991	
Lockheed L-749 Constellation	4	1962	1981	Taken from Air India
Sud Aviation Caravelle	12	1963	1976	
Tupolev Tu-154B	1	1989	1990	Leased from Aeroflot
Tupolev Tu-154B	1	1992	1993	Leased from Uzbekistan Airways and written off
Vickers VC.1 Viking	12	1953	1959	
Vickers Viscount 700	16	1957	1974	

== Livery ==
IA logo designed by National Institute of Design

The aircraft livery used while the company was called Indian Airlines was one of the longest in continuous use in the entire airline industry. The logo (IA) and the livery were designed by National Institute of Design, Ahmedabad. Its aircraft were mainly white, with the belly painted in light metallic grey. Above the windows, "Indian Airlines" was written in English on the starboard side and in Hindi on port side. The tail was bright orange, with its logo in white. In most of the aircraft, the logo was also painted on the engines over its bare metal colour. Also, when the company was under the title of Indian Airlines, to celebrate its 50th year of service the airline put the slogan "50 years of flying" in gold on many of their aircraft.

After the name change to Indian, the company's aircraft sported a new look inspired by the Sun Temple at Konark in Odisha. The tail of their aircraft had a partial blue wheel since practically over half of it is cut off. The wheel is over an orange background with the carrier's name "Indian" written in English on one side of the fuselage, and in Hindi on the other. On 15 May 2007, the Government of India released the new merger livery, which was sent to Boeing in Seattle to repaint all the new fleet coming into the new Air India. Most of the old fleets of Air India and Indian Airlines have also been painted in the new livery.

== Service ==
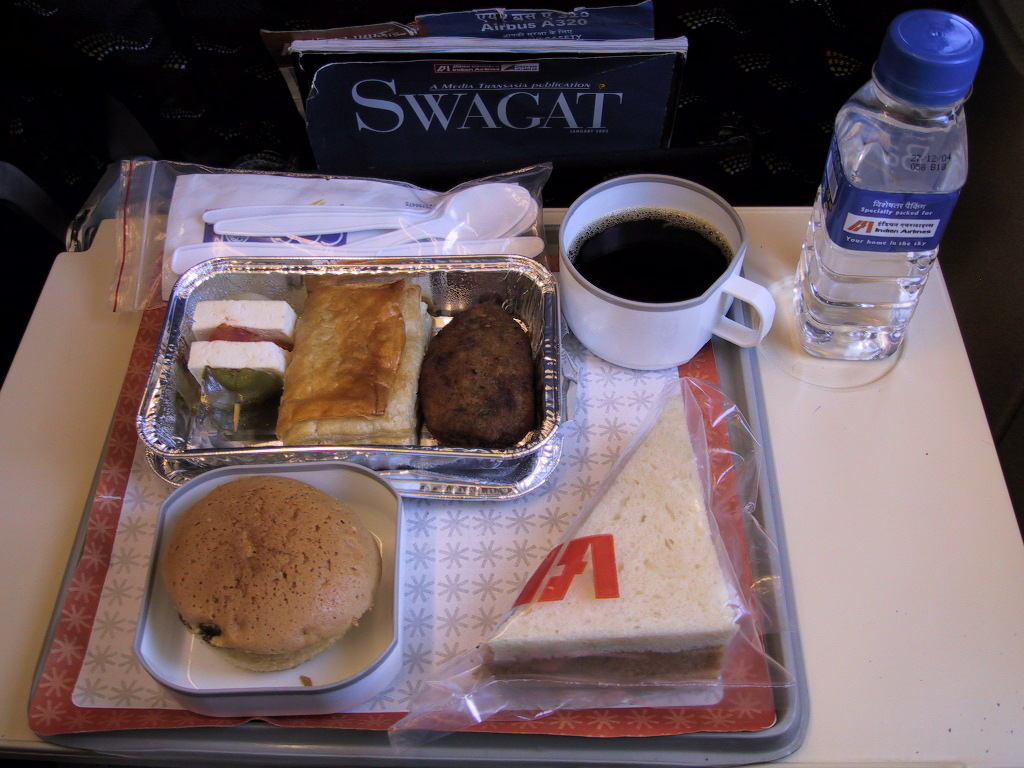
In-flight meal

Indian Airlines operated short-haul Airbus A320 family aircraft. It offered 2 classes on most sectors: Economy Class and Executive Class. Economy Class had the typical 3-3 seating of a narrow-body Airbus aircraft. Passengers were offered complimentary meals. The Executive Class seat configuration was 2–2 with a generous recline. Meals were more lavish.

== Incidents and accidents ==
=== 1950s ===
- On 12 December 1953, Douglas C-47 Skytrain VT-CHF crashed on takeoff from Sonegaon Airport, following loss of engine power and an attempt to return to the airport. Of the 14 people on board, only the captain survived.
- On 2 February 1955, Douglas C-47 Skytrain VT-CVB crashed on climb out after takeoff from Sonegaon Airport while making a turn, all 10 occupants killed.
- On 15 May 1956, Douglas C-47 Skytrain VT-DBA overran Tribhuvan Airport after landing too fast. 14 out of the 33 onboard did not survive, a person on the ground also died.
- On 24 March 1958, Douglas C-47 Skytrain VT-CYN stalled and crash on approach to Tribhuvan Airport following navigational error in poor weather conditions, all 20 occupants killed.
- On 29 March 1959, Douglas C-47 Skytrain VT-CGI experienced structural failure and crashed while on approach to Silchar Airport in bad weather, all 24 onboard died.

=== 1960s ===
- On 15 November 1961, Vickers Viscount VT-DIH was damaged beyond economic repair when the co-pilot retracted the undercarriage during landing at Ratmalana Airport, Colombo, Ceylon.
- On 3 June 1963, Douglas DC-3 VT-AUL crashed after takeoff from Pathankot Airport, breaking up in midair after jammed rudder. None of the 29 passengers and crew onboard survived.
- On 11 September 1963, Vickers Viscount VT-DIO crashed 51 kilometres (32 mi) south of Agra, killing all 18 people on board.
- On 7 February 1966, Fokker F27 Friendship PH-SAB chartered by Schreiner Airways struck the mountain range of Pir Panjal in Banihal Pass following navigational error, all 33 onboard killed.
- On 18 February 1969, Douglas DC-3 VT-CJH crashed on take-off from Jaipur – Sanganer Airport on a scheduled passenger flight. The aircraft was overloaded and take-off was either downwind or with a crosswind. All 30 people on board survived.
- On 21 April 1969, a Fokker F27 Friendship plane crashed in a thunderstorm while crossing East Pakistan (now Bangladeshi) airspace on its flight from Agartala to Calcutta, killing all 44 people on board.

=== 1970s ===
- On 29 August 1970, a Fokker F27 flew into high terrain near Silchar shortly after takeoff, killing the five crew members and their 34 passengers.
- On 30 January 1971, in the 1971 Indian Airlines hijacking, a Fokker F27 on a scheduled flight from Srinagar to Jammu was hijacked to Lahore by Ashraf and Hashim Qureshi, two Kashmiri terrorists. Passengers were returned to India on 2 February, but the hijackers destroyed the aircraft. India and Pakistan, blaming each other's intelligence services, each banned the other country's overflights and India-Pakistan flights until 1976.
- On 9 August 1971, a Vickers Viscount VT-DIX was damaged beyond economic repair when it overran the runway at Jaipur Airport. The aircraft was landed with a tailwind on a wet runway.
- On 9 December 1971, a Hawker Siddeley HS 748 near Chinnamanur was descending into Madurai when it flew into high terrain about 50 mi (80 km) from the airport, killing the four crew members and all 17 passengers. The accident occurred in reduced visibility during daylight hours.
- On 11 August 1972, a Fokker F27 at New Delhi lost altitude and crashed after aborting a landing. The four crew members and the 14 passengers were killed.
- On 15 March 1973, a HAL 748-224 Series 2 (VT-EAU) crashed near Begumpet Airport during a training flight, killing all three crew on board and one person on the ground. The pilots were drunk.
- On 31 May 1973, Flight 440, a Boeing 737 (registered VT-EAM), crashed and burned during landing at New Delhi, killing five of the seven crew members and 43 of the 58 passengers.
- On 12 October 1976, Flight 171, a Sud Aviation SE 210 Caravelle, had its right engine catch fire shortly after takeoff from Bombay. The crew attempted to return, but fuel flow to the engine was not stopped. When the fire spread through the fuselage and the hydraulic system failed, the aircraft controls failed before landing. All six crew members and their 89 passengers were killed.
- On 17 December 1978, a Boeing 737-2A8 (VT-EAL) slid off the runway at Begumpet Airport following a wheels-up landing when the leading edge devices failed to deploy on takeoff, killing one of 132 on board and another three on the ground.
- On 4 August 1979, a HAL 748-224 Series 2 (VT-DXJ) aircraft was approaching Bombay Airport at night and in poor weather when it flew into high terrain approximately 6 mi (9.7 km) from the airport, killing the four crew members and their 41 passengers.

=== 1980s ===
- On 19 August 1981, Flight 557, a HAL 748 (VT-DXF) overshot the 5,783 feet (1,763 m) runway at Mangalore Airport in wet weather. The aircraft came to a halt just beyond the runway edge. While there were no fatalities, the aircraft was damaged beyond repair and was written off. One of the passengers on board was Veerappa Moily, the then Finance Minister of Karnataka.
- On 24 August 1984, Seven young hijackers demanded an Indian Airlines jetliner IC 421, on a domestic flight from Delhi to Srinagar with 100 passengers on board, be flown to the United States. The plane was taken to Lahore, Karachi and finally to Dubai where the defense minister of UAE negotiated the release of the passengers. This hijack was related to the secessionist struggle in the Indian state of Punjab. The hijacker was subsequently extradited by UAE authorities to India, who handed over the pistol recovered from the hijacker.
- On 29 September 1986, an Airbus A300B2-1C (registered VT-ELV) overrun the runway at Chennai International Airport during aborted takeoff caused by bird strike. None of 196 people on board were injured but the aircraft was damaged beyond repair.
- On 19 October 1988, Flight 113, a Boeing 737 (registered VT-EAH) hit an electric mast 5 mi (8.0 km) out on approach to Ahmedabad in poor visibility, killing the six crew members and all but two of the 129 passengers.

=== 1990s ===
- On 14 February 1990, Flight 605, an Airbus A320 crashed on final approach at HAL Airport, Bangalore. 92 people on board were killed and 54 survived.
- On 16 August 1991, Flight 257, a Boeing 737 (registered VT-EFL) crashed on its descent into Imphal, killing all 69 occupants. The flight operating on the Calcutta-Imphal sector crashed into Thangjing Hills, about 20 nautical miles (40 km) south-west of the Imphal airport. The aircraft had taken off from Calcutta and began a descent into Imphal airport with the visibility at that time being seven kilometers. However, the aircraft lost contact with Imphal airport on the Instrument Landing System. The search and rescue efforts were hampered by bad weather conditions and a slushy terrain. The probable cause of the accident was attributed to an "error on the part of the Pilot-in-Command in not adhering to the operational flight.
- On 26 April 1993, Flight 491, a Boeing 737 (registered VT-ECQ) started its takeoff from Aurangabad's runway 09 in hot and humid temperatures. After lifting off almost at the end of the runway, it heavily collided with a lorry on a highway at the end of the runway. The left main landing gear, left engine bottom cowling and thrust reverser impacted the left side of the truck at a height of nearly seven feet from the level of the road. Thereafter the aircraft hit the high tension electric wires nearly 3 km North-East of the runway and hit the ground, causing 63 Injuries and 55 fatalities.
- On 15 November 1993, Indian Airlines Flight 440, an Airbus A300 (registered VT-EDV) executed a missed approach at Hyderabad's Begumpet Airport due to poor visibility, but the flaps failed to retract. After trying to solve the problem while flying in the vicinity of Hyderabad, the crew eventually diverted the aircraft to Chennai. The delay in diverting, and the need to fly slower due to the extended flaps, resulted in the aircraft running out of fuel on the way. The aircraft force-landed in a paddy field and was damaged beyond repair. All 262 people on board survived. Telugu actors Chiranjeevi and Bala Krishna and Allu Ramalingaiah survived this crash attracting widespread attention.
- On 24 December 1999, Flight 814, an Airbus A300B2-101 (registered VT-EDW) was hijacked just after taking off from Kathmandu, Nepal to Delhi. The plane flew around different points in the subcontinent and the Middle east. It finally landed in Kandahar, Afghanistan, as officials of the government of India and the Taliban negotiated. One passenger was killed and some were released. On 31 December 1999, the rest of the hostages were freed in exchange for the release of Mushtaq Ahmed Zargar, Ahmed Omar Saeed Sheikh and Maulana Masood Azhar. Indian Airlines, India's sole domestic airline up to 1993, was hijacked 16 times, from 1971 to 1999.

== Financials ==
Given below is a chart of trend of profitability of Indian Airlines as published in the 2004 annual report by Ministry of Civil Aviation with figures in millions of Indian Rupees.

Year	Operating Revenues	Operating Profit (Loss)
2002	Rs. 41,015 million	Rs. 1,347 million
2003	Rs. 46,498 million	Rs. 1,251 million
