= Keshod =

- Town
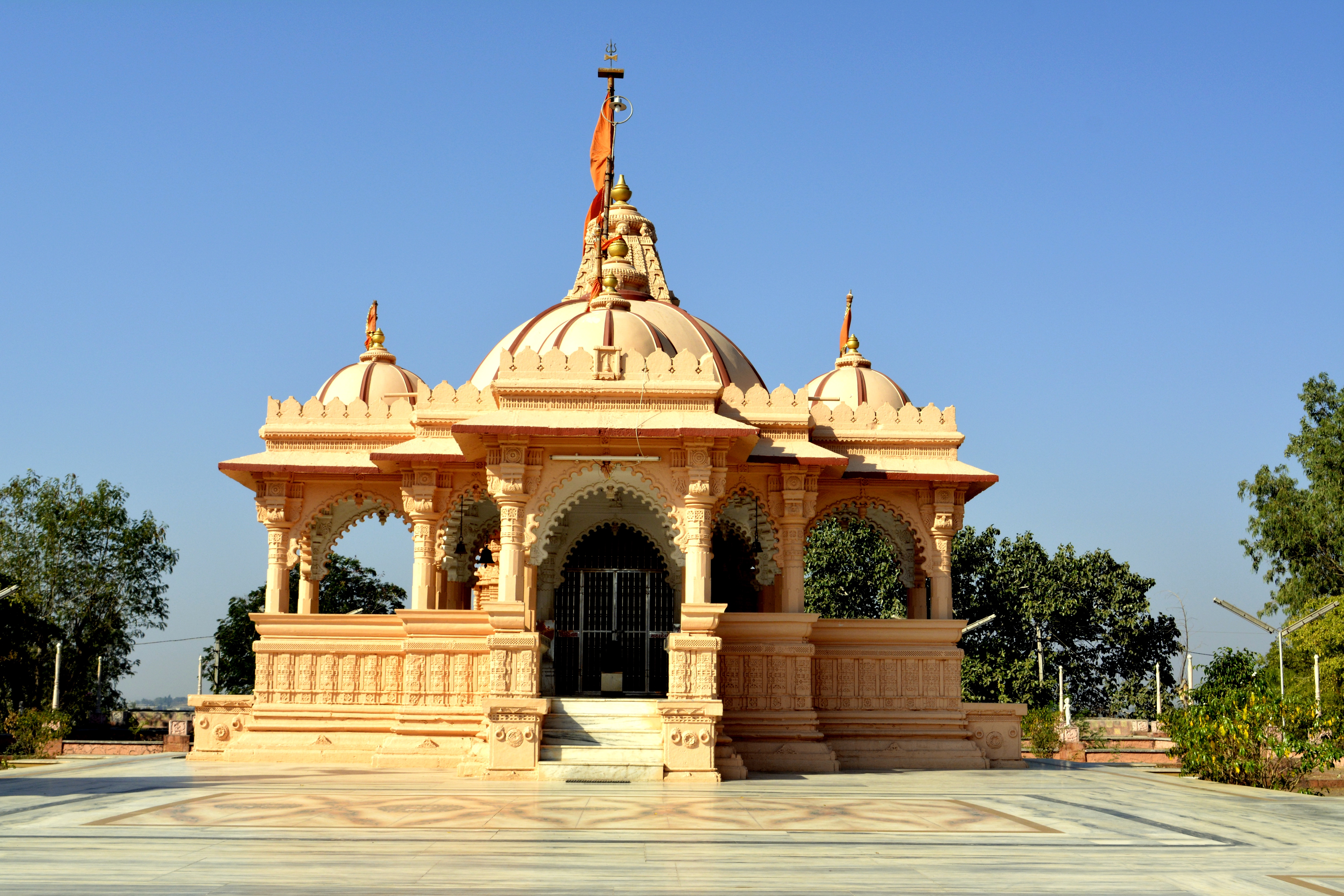
- Shiv Temple - Akshaygadh, Keshod

- Location in Gujarat, India
- Coordinates: 21.301290°N 70.249772°E
- Country: India
- State: Gujarat
- District: Junagadh

Government
  - Type: Municipal Corporation
  - Body: Keshod Nagarpalika
- Elevation: 42 m (138 ft)

Population (2014)
  - Total: 76,193

Languages
  - Official: Gujarati, Hindi
- Time zone: UTC+5:30 (IST)
- PIN: 362220
- Telephone: 02871
- Vehicle registration: GJ-11

Keshod is a town and a Taluka in Junagadh District, which is located in Gujarat

== Infrastructure ==
Keshod Airport serves Junagadh District, which was used by Nawab of Junagadh, Muhammad Mahabat Khanji III while escaping to Pakistan.

== Transportation ==
Keshod has a government bus station and private buses as well, with connections to Junagadh, Somanath, Veraval, Rajkot, Ahmedabad, Jamnagar, Gandhinagar and other big cities.

Also Keshod railway station which connect to western railways. to Somnath->Junagadh->Rajkot->Porbandar->Ahmedabad->Jabalpur->Mumbai->Pune.

Keshod Airport is a public airport located in Keshod, It primarily serves the cities of Junagadh and Veraval and the surrounding region.

== Terrain ==
Keshod's landscape is mostly dry. It is 30 kilometres from the sea. During the monsoon months it often rains heavily in and around Keshod but the searing heat means that for a lot of the year there are problems with receiving running water. There are a few small rivers including Sabri which provides water to the city of the Keshod, while Ozat River flows through south western part of the Taluka and serves areas of Ghed (ઘેડ) with its water. There is a mountain called Akshaygadh mountain which is around 3 km away from the city and has a height of around 250 meters. Some of the villages of Keshod falls under Gir region which is famous for Lions and Gir Kesar Mango as well. Farming is the largest employer with groundnut and cotton being the most popular crop grown.

== Industries ==
Gujarat's biggest TB Hospital located in Keshod. There is a 150+ Groundnut oil factory in Keshod. Keshod is also famous for Chhakado rickshaw Manufacturing. Keshod is Also Known for its furniture manufacturing industries around 300 small and big manufacturing unit are working. Keshod is also known for its Kapada (cloth) bazaar in the retail sector.

== Climate ==
Climate data for Keshod Airport (1991–2020, extremes 1969–2020)
Month	Jan	Feb	Mar	Apr	May	Jun	Jul	Aug	Sep	Oct	Nov	Dec	Year
Record high °C (°F)	37.0 (98.6)	39.5 (103.1)	43.9 (111.0)	44.4 (111.9)	45.5 (113.9)	42.8 (109.0)	37.2 (99.0)	38.0 (100.4)	39.4 (102.9)	41.8 (107.2)	39.2 (102.6)	37.2 (99.0)	45.5 (113.9)
Mean daily maximum °C (°F)	29.2 (84.6)	31.9 (89.4)	35.7 (96.3)	37.6 (99.7)	36.9 (98.4)	34.9 (94.8)	31.2 (88.2)	30.1 (86.2)	32.0 (89.6)	35.4 (95.7)	33.8 (92.8)	30.8 (87.4)	33.3 (91.9)
Mean daily minimum °C (°F)	12.0 (53.6)	14.2 (57.6)	17.8 (64.0)	21.6 (70.9)	25.4 (77.7)	26.8 (80.2)	25.7 (78.3)	24.7 (76.5)	23.7 (74.7)	21.1 (70.0)	17.3 (63.1)	13.3 (55.9)	20.1 (68.2)
Record low °C (°F)	3.6 (38.5)	4.4 (39.9)	8.8 (47.8)	14.3 (57.7)	17.4 (63.3)	20.1 (68.2)	21.7 (71.1)	22.0 (71.6)	18.8 (65.8)	13.6 (56.5)	9.0 (48.2)	4.9 (40.8)	3.6 (38.5)
Average rainfall mm (inches)	0.7 (0.03)	0.5 (0.02)	0.0 (0.0)	0.0 (0.0)	1.1 (0.04)	138.0 (5.43)	372.8 (14.68)	200.1 (7.88)	134.0 (5.28)	31.5 (1.24)	5.3 (0.21)	0.1 (0.00)	884.1 (34.81)
Average rainy days	0.1	0.1	0.0	0.0	0.2	4.8	12.6	10.4	5.2	1.4	0.1	0.0	34.9
Average relative humidity (%) (at 17:30 IST)	31	29	30	35	49	64	77	77	67	45	30	29	46
Source: India Meteorological Department

== See also ==
- Keshod Airport
- Keshod Railway Station
- Keshod Assembly Constituency
