= Begumpet Airport =

Airport in Hyderabad, India

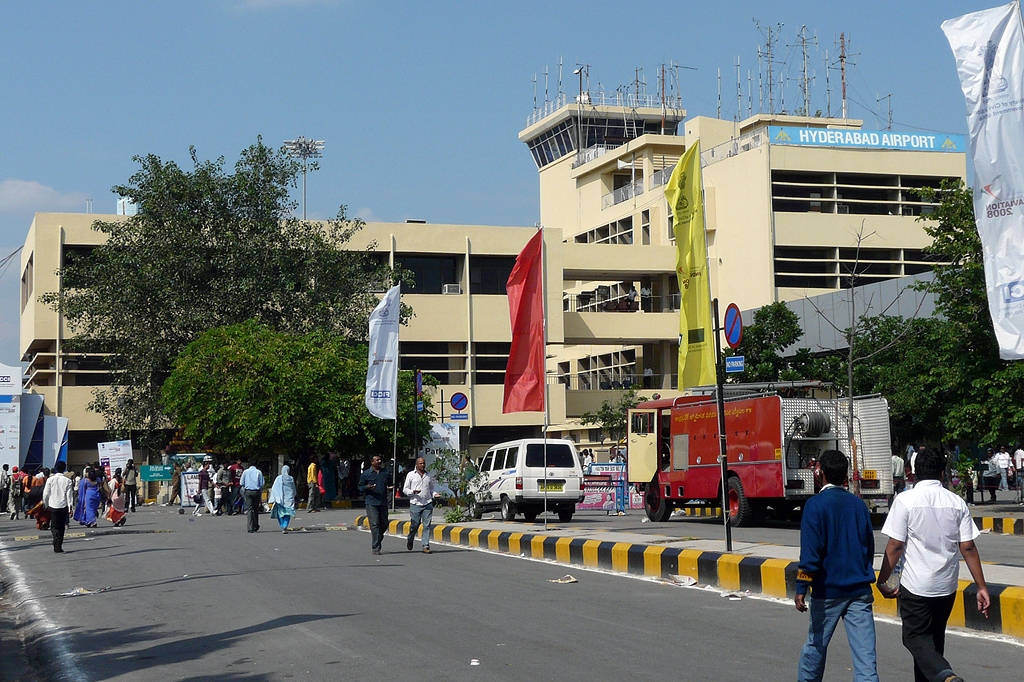
- IATA: BPM; ICAO: VOHY

Summary
- Airport type: Military/Public
- Owner/Operator: Airports Authority of India
- Serves: Hyderabad
- Location: Begumpet, Telangana, India
- Opened: June 1936
- Passenger services ceased: 23 March 2008
- Elevation AMSL: 532 m (1,745 ft)
- Coordinates: 17°27′11″N 078°28′03″E
- Interactive map of Begumpet Airport

Runways
Direction	Length		Surface
Direction	m	ft	Surface
09/27	3,230	10,597	Macadam

Statistics (April 2025 – March 2026)
- Passengers: 10,369 (▼34.5%)
- Aircraft movements: 2,928 (▼30.9%)
- Cargo tonnage: 0 ( 0%)
- Source: AAI

Begumpet Airport (IATA: BPM, ICAO: VOHY) is an airport that serves Hyderabad in Telangana, India. It is located in Begumpet and caters to general and military aviation. The airport is home to the Begumpet Air Force Station of the Indian Air Force. Begumpet was built by the Princely State of Hyderabad in the 1930s and served as the city's commercial airport for several decades. It eventually became overcrowded, with little room for expansion. After the opening of Rajiv Gandhi International Airport in Shamshabad on 23 March 2008, Begumpet ceased all commercial operations.

== History ==
In 1934–1935, Mir Osman Ali Khan, the last nizam of the Princely State of Hyderabad, decided to establish an airport in Begumpet on the outskirts of Hyderabad. The Hyderabad State Aero Club was inaugurated at Begumpet in June 1936, and Princess Dürrüşehvar laid the foundation stone for a terminal building five months later. In 1937, Tata's service from Karachi to Madras began operating via Begumpet instead of the Hakimpet airfield. In April 1940, the Nizam's State Railway Air Department introduced flights to Madras via Bangalore. The route ceased in July; the airline's fleet was turned over to the government of India amid the Second World War. The airport was among the most developed in India at the time of the war.

During the war, the state government granted control of Begumpet to the Directorate of Civil Aviation. The Royal Air Force took over and set up a flying school in 1942. In May 1946, the maiden flight of Deccan Airways from Begumpet to Bangalore took place. The airline operated India's first Hajj flight from the airport five months later. As of 1948, civilian flights to Hyderabad landed at Hakimpet while expansion work was underway at Begumpet. In May 1950, commercial airlines moved to Begumpet.

Work on the runway to enable it to handle Caravelle jets was finished in 1965. In the 1970s, Indian Airlines linked Hyderabad to seven cities in the country and used Caravelles on flights to Bombay. A new terminal was completed in 1972, and Begumpet handled 250,000 passengers in 1975. The airport had international flights to Sharjah and Kuwait in the 1990s.

In the 1990s, the government of Andhra Pradesh decided to build a new airport for Hyderabad. Officials ultimately chose a site in Shamshabad, 30 kilometres (19 mi) from the city. Passenger counts were climbing quickly at Begumpet, and the terminal was inadequate. There was little room to expand the airport as the development of the surrounding areas meant that Begumpet was now in the middle of the city. The growth of Hyderabad's information technology and pharmaceutical industries added more pressure to construct a new airport. In 2004, the Indian government signed a concession agreement with the consortium building the Shamshabad airport that required commercial operations at Begumpet to cease when the new airport opened.

In February 2005, Lufthansa commenced a nonstop flight between Hyderabad and Frankfurt, and Air Sahara opened a hub at the airport. The Airports Authority of India responded to the rising traffic by adding another jet bridge and five parking stands. Between April 2006 and March 2007, 5.8 million travellers passed through the airport, a 44% increase over the previous year. The final passenger flight to take off from Begumpet was a Thai Airways International flight to Bangkok at 00:25 on 23 March 2008. Rajiv Gandhi International Airport opened the same day. When scheduled service ended, Begumpet was the sixth busiest airport in India and was served by 10 Indian and 13 foreign airlines.

== Facilities and operations ==
The airport has one runway named 09/27. It measures 3,230 by 45 metres (10,597 ft × 148 ft) and is made of macadam.

Begumpet is used for flight training and houses an air force station. Businesspeople, politicians, and others fly into the airport on their private aircraft. Begumpet also hosts Wings India, the country's first civilian air show. The biennial event is organised by the Ministry of Civil Aviation, Federation of Indian Chambers of Commerce and Industry, and Airports Authority of India. It was first held in October 2008 under the name India Aviation.

During the period of commercial operations, Begumpet was officially called Hyderabad Airport and had two terminals. The domestic terminal was named for N. T. Rama Rao; the international one, for Rajiv Gandhi.

== Accidents and incidents ==
- On the night of 12 January 1978, an Indian Airlines Boeing 737-200 operating a flight from Bombay to Hyderabad had just touched down when the crew saw a man on the runway. The aircraft struck him, and he died on the way to a hospital. The investigation determined that the man had breached security at Begumpet Airport.
