= ASU =

ASU, asu, or Asu may refer to:

== Languages ==
- Asu language (Nigeria), spoken in Western Nigeria
- Asu language (Tanzania), spoken by the Gweno people in the Kilimanjaro Region of Tanzania. Also called Pare.

== Universities ==
=== Bahrain ===
- Applied Science University (Bahrain)

=== Egypt ===
- Ain Shams University

=== India ===
- Allahabad State University

=== Japan ===
- Aichi Sangyo University
- Aichi Shukutoku University

=== Lithuania ===
- Aleksandras Stulginskis University

=== Mongolia ===
- American School of Ulaanbaatar

=== Philippines ===
- Aklan State University

=== Russia ===
- Altai State University

=== United States ===
- Arizona State University, Tempe, Arizona
- Appalachian State University, Boone, North Carolina
- Alabama State University, Montgomery, Alabama
- Angelo State University, San Angelo, Texas
- Albany State University, Albany, Georgia
- Alcorn State University, Lorman, Mississippi
- American Sentinel University, Denver, Colorado
- American Sports University, San Bernardino, California
- Arkansas State University, Jonesboro, Arkansas
- Augusta State University, Augusta, Georgia
- Adams State University, Alamosa, Colorado

== Places ==
- Asu or Asow (Persian: اسو) may refer to several places in Iran:
  - Asu, Gilan
  - Asu, Hormozgan
  - Asu, Razavi Khorasan
  - Asu, South Khorasan
- Asu Temple, a Hindu temple in Central Java, Indonesia
- Asunción, Paraguay, also known as Asu

== Other uses ==
- ASU-57, Soviet airborne support gun
- ASU-85, Soviet airborne support gun
- Aikido Schools of Ueshiba
- Air separation unit, a device used in air separation
- Airport Security Unit (disambiguation)
- Army Service Uniform
- Asu Rito, a fictional character from the video game Yandere Simulator
- Australian Services Union
- Active service unit, individual units with the Provisional Irish Republican Army
- Arab Socialist Union (disambiguation), the name of a number of political parties in the Arab world
- Asian Skating Union
- Asu (film), a 2021 Sri Lankan drama film directed by Sanjeewa Pushpakumara
- Arbitrary Strength Unit, a performance metric for mobile phone signals
- ASU, an IATA code for the Silvio Pettirossi International Airport in Luque, near Asunción, Paraguay
- Tocantins Asurini language, an ISO 639-3 code
