= Civil aviation in India =

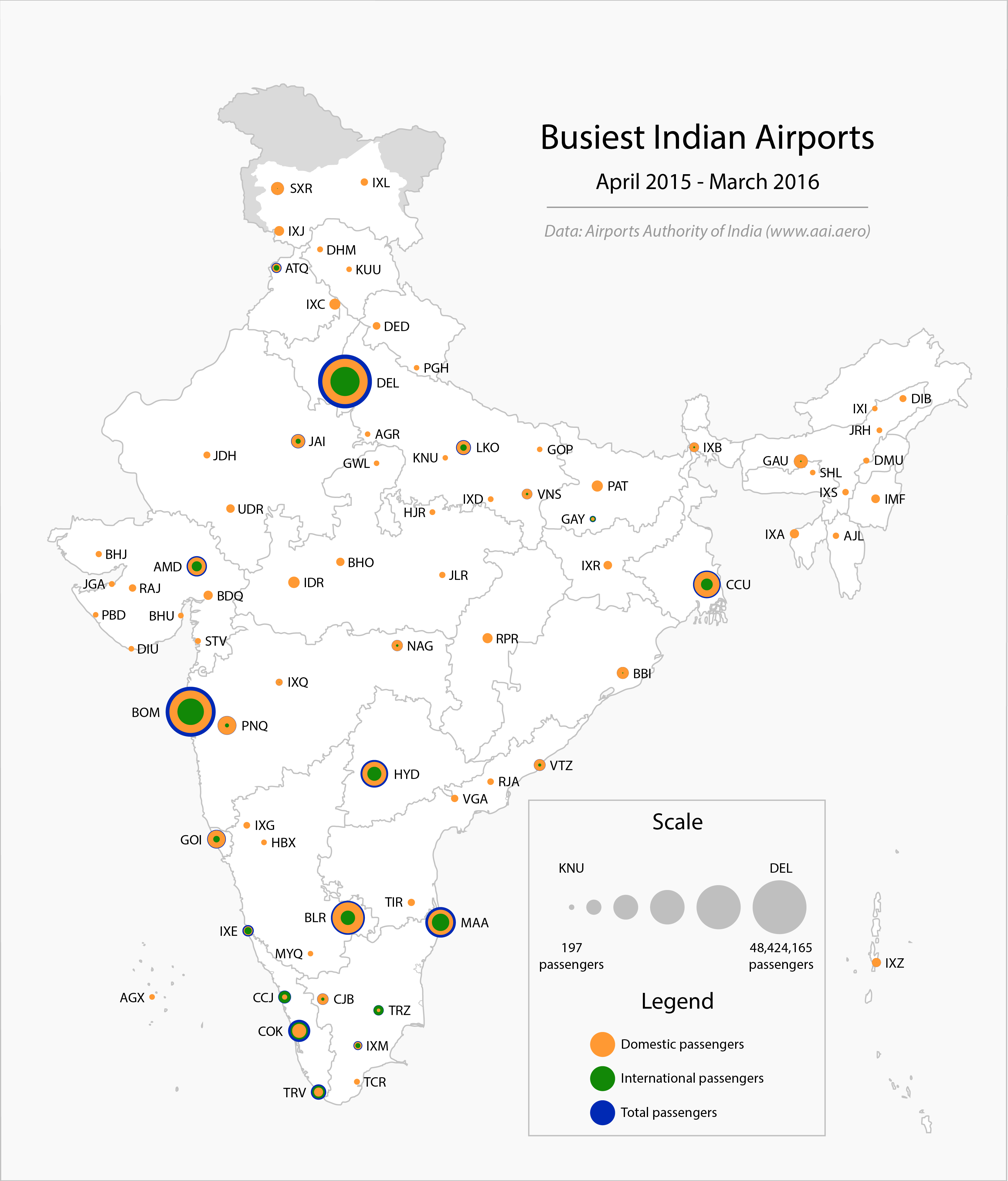
The busiest Indian airports (2015–16)

Civil aviation in India, the world's fastest growing domestic air traffic market (6.9%) and third-largest civil aviation market (4.2% of global air traffic) in 2024 behind USA (18%) and China (16.7%), contributes nearly US$54 billion in circular economy and nearly US$6 billion in direct economy to the GDP of India with nearly 370,000 direct and 7.7 million indirect jobs created. In the 2024 fiscal year, India had 376 million air passengers, including 306 million domestic passengers, and the largest airline by international passenger traffic was Air India with 23.6% of total international passenger traffic in and out of India, followed by Indigo (17.6%) and Emirates (8.3%). Low-cost carriers (LCC) dominate the Indian market with 71% scheduled seats dominated by IndiGo (54%), Air India (12%), and Air India Express (8.6%). Due to the expansion of LCCs, the inflation-adjusted domestic fares have fallen 21% and international fares by 38% since 2011, while commercial aircraft fleet has more than doubled in last 10 years with 860 aircraft in service (2.4% of the global fleet) with order book of another 739 over next five years, with 7.3 years average aircraft age compared to the 14.8 years global average. India's aviation market continues to evolve at remarkable speed, with a dynamic mix of domestic resilience and international expansion. As of July 2025, the market features 85 airlines and 117 airports, reflecting the country's pivotal role in connecting millions of passengers both domestically and globally.

The origin of civil aviation India dates back to 1911, when the first commercial civil aviation flight took off from a polo ground in Allahabad carrying mail across the Yamuna river to Naini. Air India is India's national flag carrier, having merged with Indian Airlines in 2007 and plays a major role in connecting India with the rest of the world. IndiGo, Air India, Air India Express, Akasa Air, and Spicejet are the major carriers in order of their market share. These airlines connect more than 80 cities across India and also operate overseas routes after the liberalisation of Indian aviation. Several other foreign airlines connect Indian cities with other major cities across the globe. However, a large section of country's air transport potential remains untapped, even though the Mumbai–Delhi air corridor is ranked the world's third-busiest route.

== History of civil aviation ==
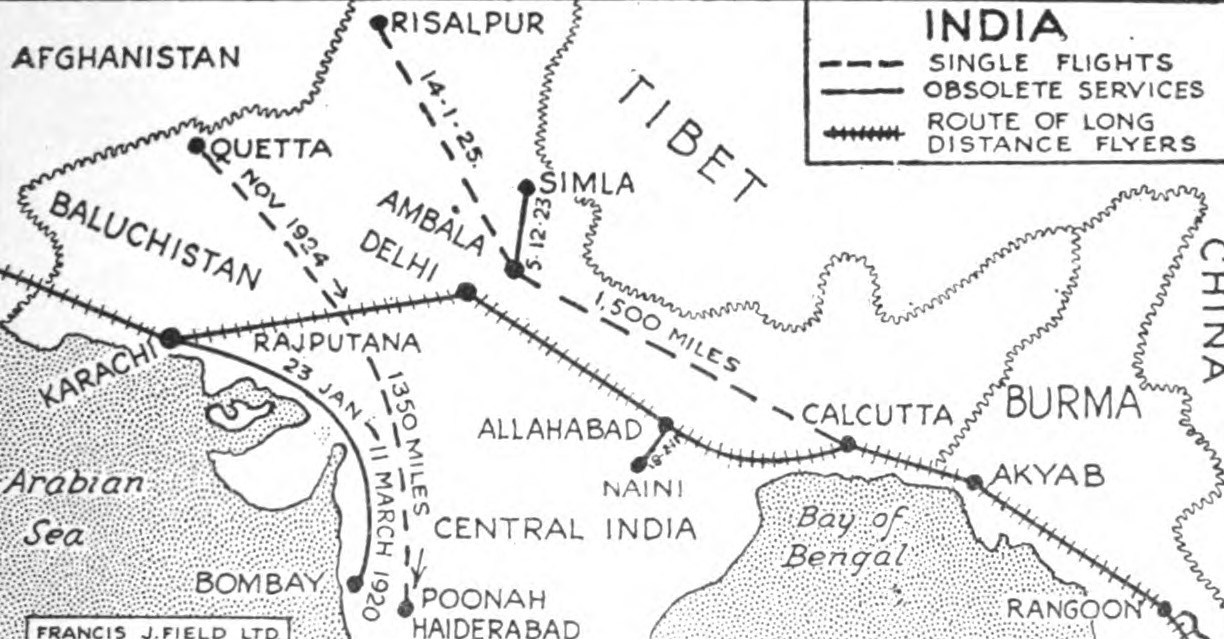
Air routes of British India in 1925

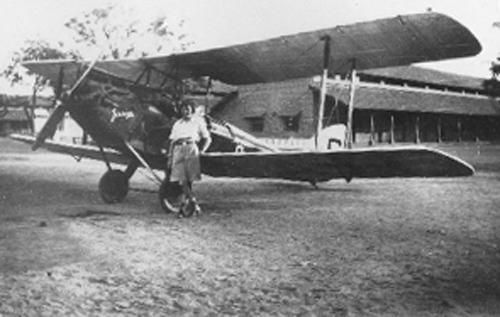
Photograph of Amy Johnson with Jason (Moth) aircraft at Jhansi in India (c. 1930).

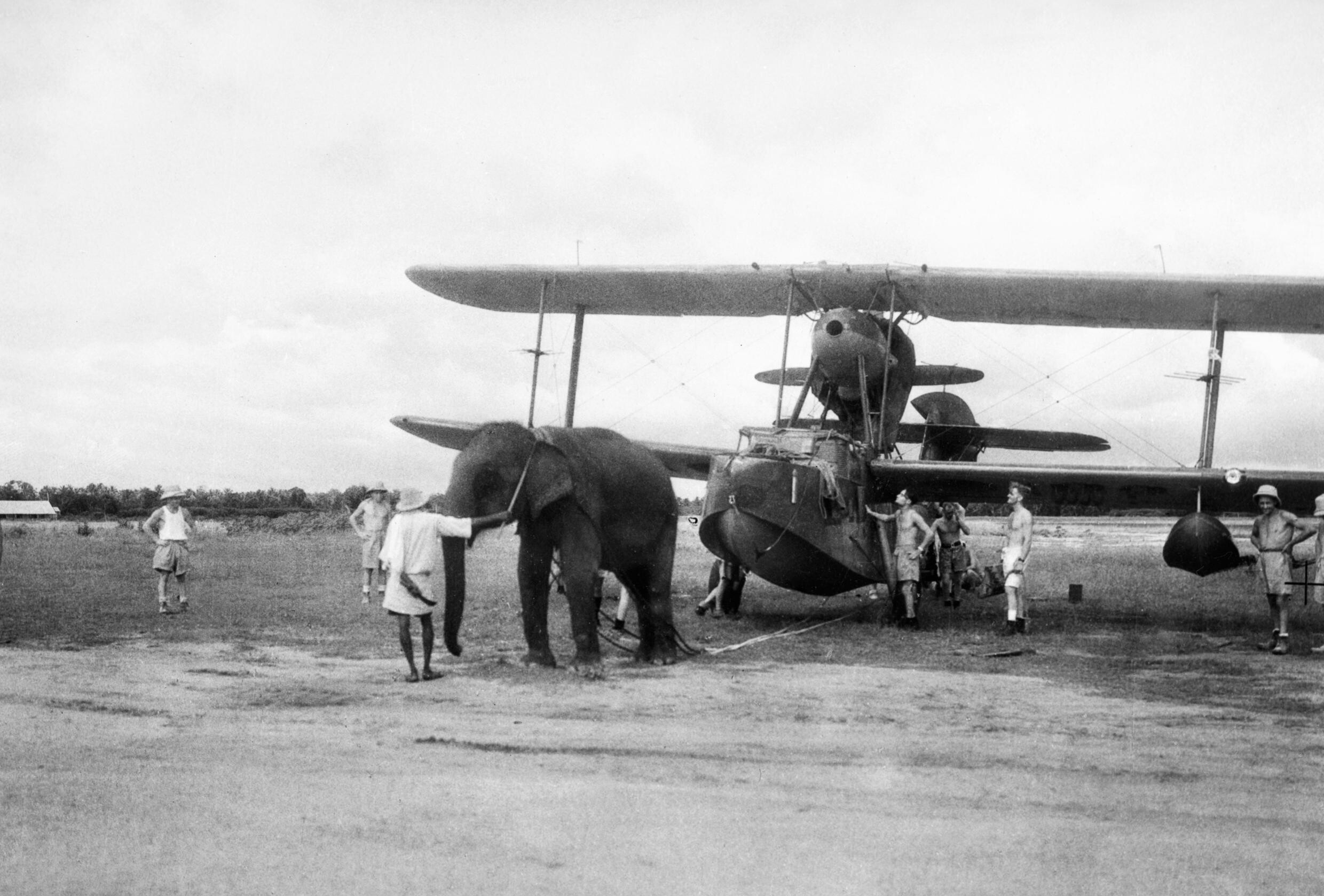
An elephant pulling a Supermarine Walrus aircraft into position at a Fleet Air Arm station in India (c. June 1944).

Modern civil Aviation in India traces back to 18 February 1911, when the first commercial civil aviation flight took off from Allahabad for Naini over a distance of 6 miles (9.7 km). During the Allahabad Exhibition, Henri Pequet, a French aviator, carried 6,500 pieces of mail on a Humber biplane from the exhibition to the receiving office at Allahabad. This is the world's first official airmail service. The first commercial airline in present-day India was Handley Page Indo-Burmese Transport. On 15 October 1932, J. R. D. Tata flew a consignment of mail from Karachi to Juhu Airport. His airline later became Air India.

In March 1953, the Indian Parliament passed the Air Corporations Act. India's airline industry was nationalised and the eight domestic airlines operating independently at that time – Deccan Airways, Airways India, Bharat Airways, Himalayan Aviation, Kalinga Airlines, Indian National Airways, Air India and Air Services of India – were merged into two government-owned entities. Indian Airlines focussed on domestic routes and Air India International on international services. The International Airports Authority of India (IAAI) was constituted in 1972 while the National Airports Authority was constituted in 1986. The Bureau of Civil Aviation Security was established in 1987 following the tragic crash of Air India Flight 182. Pushpaka Aviation operated scheduled international passenger flights from Bombay to Sharjah, as an associate carrier of Air India from 1979 to 1983.

East-West Airlines was the first national-level private airline to operate in the country after the government de-regularised the civil aviation sector in 1991. The government allowed private airlines to operate charter and non-scheduled services under the 'Air Taxi' Scheme until 1994, when the Air Corporation Act was repealed and private airlines could now operate scheduled services. Private airlines like Air Sahara, Modiluft, Damania Airways and NEPC Airlines among others commenced domestic operations during this period.

Air India placed orders for more than 68 jets from Boeing for US$7.5 billion in 2006 while Indian placed orders for 43 jets from Airbus for US$2.5 billion in 2005. IndiGo announced orders for 100 Airbus A320s worth US$6 billion during the Paris Air Show, the highest by any Asian domestic carrier. Kingfisher Airlines became the first Indian air carrier on 15 June 2005 to order Airbus A380 aircraft worth US$3 billion.

More than half a dozen low-cost carriers entered the Indian market in 2004–05. Major new entrants included Air Deccan, Air Sahara, Kingfisher Airlines, SpiceJet, GoAir, Paramount Airways and IndiGo. But Indian aviation industry struggled due to economic slowdown, rising fuel and operation costs. This led to consolidation, buy outs and discontinuations in the Indian airline industry. In 2007, Air Sahara and Air Deccan were acquired by Jet Airways and Kingfisher Airlines respectively. Paramount Airways ceased operations in 2010 and Kingfisher shut down in 2012. AirAsia India, a low-cost carrier operating as a joint venture between Air Asia and Tata Sons launched in 2014. Vistara, another carrier was established as a joint venture between Tata Sons and Singapore Airlines. As of 2013–14, only IndiGo and GoAir were generating profits. GoAir ceased operations in May 2023.

== Aviation economy ==
=== Market size ===
India is the world's third-largest civil aviation market (as of June 2024). It recorded air traffic of 131 million passengers in 2016. Airlines in India are also estimated to add 600 planes to their fleets in the next 5 years.

In 2015, Boeing projected India's demand for aircraft to touch 1,740, valued at $240 billion, over the next 20 years in India. This would account for 4.3 per cent of global volumes. According to Airbus, India will be one of the top three aviation markets globally in the next 20 years. Airbus is expecting an annual growth rate of over 11 per cent for the domestic market in India over the next ten years, while the combined growth rate for domestic and international routes would also be more than 10 per cent.

The table shows the air passenger traffic in India with the financial year ending in March:

	2010	2011	2012	2013	2014	2015	2016	2017	2018	2019	2020	2021	2022
Total passengers	77.4	88.9	98.9	98.2	103.8	115.8	135	158.4	183.9	204.2	202	62.1	105.4
Domestic passengers	45.3	53.8	60.8	57.9	60.7	70.1	85.2	103.7	123.3	140.3	141.2	53.3	84.2
International passengers	32.1	35.1	38.1	40.3	43.1	45.7	49.8	54.7	60.6	63.9	60.8	8.8	21.2

This is the domestic market share of airlines across India in March 2026 by passengers carried:

Domestic market share of airlines across India in March 2026
1. IndiGo (63.3%)
2. Air India & Air India Express (26.2%)
3. Akasa Air (5.40%)
4. SpiceJet (3.80%)
5. Others (1.30%)

	Domestic market share
IndiGo	63.3%
Air India Group(including Air India Express)	26.2%
Akasa Air	5.4%
SpiceJet	3.8%
Others	1.3%

=== Future ===
==== UDAN-RCS scheme ====
To increase the number of operational airports, number of operational airports with scheduled flights, number of routes, number of flyers and to reduce the cost of flying, the Government of India launched UDAN-RCS scheme from 2016, which increased number of operational airports from 49 to 70 within first round that was awarded in April 2017, several more rounds were awarded in Dec 2017, and many more rounds are planned later in 2018 and 2019 with number of operational airports expected to go to 150 or even more.

==== FDI ====
With a view to aid in modernization of the existing airports to establish a high standard and help ease the pressure on the existing airports, 100% FDI under automatic route has now been allowed in Brownfield Airport projects. This move would also serve in further developing the domestic aviation infrastructure. Further, FDI limit for Scheduled Air Transport Service/ Domestic Scheduled Passenger Airline and regional Air Transport Service has been raised from 49% to 100%, with FDI up to 49% permitted under automatic route and FDI beyond 49% through Government approval. For Non-Resident Indians (NRI's), 100% FDI will continue to be allowed under automatic route. However, foreign airlines would continue to be allowed to invest in capital of Indian companies operating scheduled and non-scheduled air transport services up to the limit of 49% of their paid up capital and subject to the laid down conditions in the existing policy. Increasing the FDI limit for these aviation services shall not only encourage competition by lowering prices but shall also accord choice to consumers.

==== MRO ====
The civil aviation sector in India, which till now was dependent on foreign countries for maintenance, repair and overhaul (MRO) services, is planning to have indigenous facilities. The Government of India is planning to develop a sustainable air network in over 400 tier-2 cities across India with an estimated expenditure of ₹50 crores.

==== Vision 2040 ====
The Ministry of Civil Aviation released a report entitled "Vision 2040" on 15 January 2019 outlining a roadmap for the future of civil aviation in India. The report projects that air passenger traffic will increase sixfold to 1.1 billion by 2040 including 821 million domestic and 303 million international passengers. The report estimates that a total of 2,359 aircraft would be required to server passengers in March 2040. The government expects air cargo movement to quadruple to 17 million tons in 2040. The Ministry projected that the number of airport in India would rise from 101 in January 2019 to around 190–200 by March 2040 and an estimated 150,000 acres of land and US$40–50 billion of capital would be required for construction. The government proposed creating a $2 billion fund to help support low-traffic airports. The report also targets establishing an aircraft manufacturing base in India by 2040.

== Management ==
=== Regulations ===
The industry is governed by the provisions of Bharatiya Vayuyan Adhiniyam, 2024. According to the '5/20 rule,’ all airlines in India need five years of domestic flying experience and at least 20 aircraft in its fleet in order to fly abroad. The proposal to review or scrap the 5/20 rule had come up during the tenure of former aviation minister Ajit Singh and around the same time when Tata Group evinced interest in investing in airline sector.

Regulations requiring hand baggage tags to be stamped by security personnel at all airports was introduced from 1992. Between 15 and 21 December 2016, the CISF conducted a week-long trial at 6 airports during which all domestic passengers would be exempted from the stamping requirement. Civil aviation security regulator Bureau of Civil Aviation Security (BCAS) announced on 23 February 2017, that stamping baggage tags was no longer required at seven airports – Delhi, Mumbai, Kolkata, Bengaluru, Hyderabad, Ahmedabad and Cochin. The Ministry of Civil Aviation intends to gradually eliminate the requirement from all airports.

=== National Civil Aviation Policy 2016 ===
The Government of India released the National Civil Aviation Policy on 15 June 2016. The NCAP 2016 covers the broad policy areas, such as Regional connectivity, Safety, Air Transport Operations, 5/20 Requirement for International Operations, Bilateral traffic rights, Fiscal Support, Maintenance, Repair and Overhaul, Air-cargo, Aeronautical 'Make in India'. The broad key features of the NCAP are :

- VGF for operation under Regional Connectivity Scheme (RCS).
- Revival of un-served or under-served routes under RCS.
- Introduction of a new Category 'Schedule Commuter Operator' under Commercial Air Transport Operations.
- Rationalization of Category-I routes under Route Dispersal Guidelines (RDGs) on the basis of criteria given in NCAP 2016.
- The requirement of five years and 20 aircraft for international operation was modified to 0 years and 20 aircraft or 20% of the total capacity (in terms of average number of seats on all departure put together) whichever is higher for domestic operations.
- Liberalization of domestic code share points in India within the framework of ASA.

=== Partnerships ===
India's aviation regulator, the Directorate General of Civil Aviation (DGCA), and United States Technical Development Agency (USTDA) signed the Grant Agreement for India Aviation Safety Technical Assistance Phase II on 9 February 2016. Under the agreement, USTDA will partially fund improving systems at the DGCA. While USTDA's assistance will be of $808,327, contractor firm The Wicks Group (TWG) would share the cost of assistance at $75,000.

=== Security ===
The security of Indian airports is ensured by the Central Industrial Security Force (CISF) through its Airport Sector. Three Indian aircraft have been hijacked: 1971 Indian Airlines hijacking (1971), Indian Airlines Flight 427 (1993) and Indian Airlines Flight 814 (1999).

=== Social and environmental responsibility ===
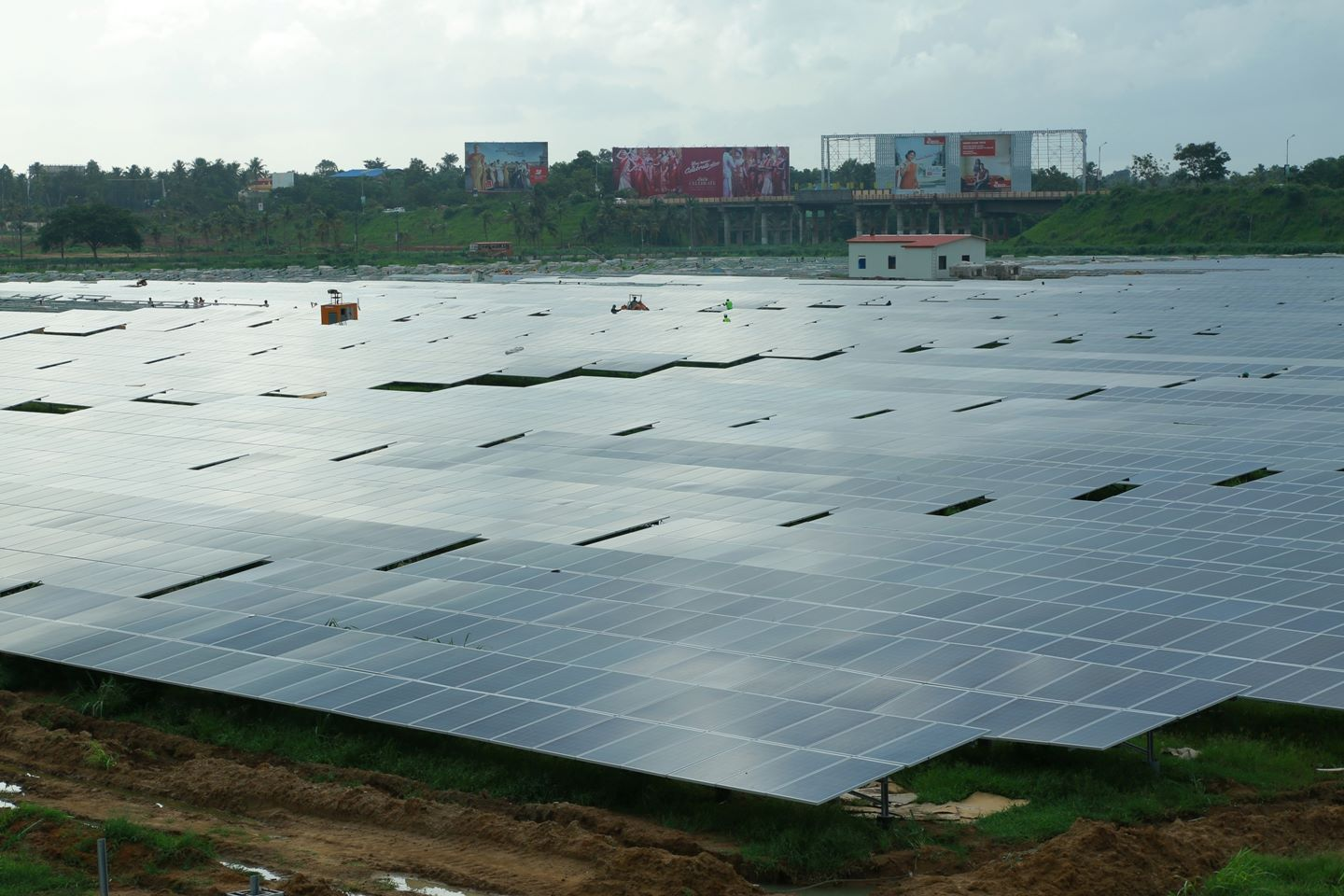
Solar panels at the Cochin International Airport, the world's first airport fully powered by solar energy

Travel by air has significant environmental impacts. Construction of new airports may require land acquisition, and can be mired in controversies, as happened in the case of the Aranmula International Airport.

The world's first airport fully powered by solar energy is at Kochi. Indira Gandhi International Airport at Delhi is a "carbon neutral" airport.

As of October 2016, India is not a signatory to the UN supported 'Carbon Offsetting and Reduction Scheme for International Aviation' (CORSIA). 66 countries contributing more than 85% of international aviation activity has decided to voluntarily participate in this mechanism from the introductory phase itself.

New constructions in some of the airports such as Chandigarh and Vadodara have adopted green building features.

=== Drones ===
India updated its national drone policy in August 2021.

== Organizations ==
=== Ministry of Civil Aviation ===
The Ministry of Civil Aviation (MoCA) of Government of India is the nodal Ministry responsible for the formulation of national policies and programmes for development and regulation of civilian aviation, and for devising and implementing schemes for the orderly growth and expansion of civilian air transport. Its functions extend to overseeing airport facilities, air traffic services and carriage of passengers and goods by air. The Ministry also administers implementation of the 1934 Aircraft Act and is administratively responsible for the Commission of Railways Safety.

The ministry also controls aviation related autonomous organisations like the Airports Authority of India (AAI), Bureau of Civil Aviation Security (BCAS), Indira Gandhi Rashtriya Uran Akademi and Public Sector Undertaking - Pawan Hans Helicopters Limited.

=== DGCA ===
The Directorate General of Civil Aviation (DGCA) is the national regulatory body for civil aviation under the Ministry of Civil Aviation. This directorate investigates aviation accidents and incidents. The government of India is planning to replace the organisation with a Civil Aviation Authority (CAA), modelled on the lines of the American Federal Aviation Administration (FAA).

=== Airports Authority of India ===
AAI's implementation of Automatic Dependence Surveillance System (ADSS), using indigenous technology at Kolkata and Chennai Air Traffic Control Centres, made India the first country to use this technology in the Southeast Asian region, thus enabling air traffic control over oceanic areas using a satellite mode of communication. Performance-based navigation (PBN) procedures have already been implemented at Mumbai, Delhi and Ahmedabad Airports, and are likely to be implemented at other airports in a phased manner. AAI is implementing the GAGAN project in technological collaboration with the Indian Space Research Organization (ISRO), where the satellite-based system will be used for navigation. The navigation signals thus received from the GPS will be augmented to meet the navigational requirements of aircraft.

AAI has four training establishments: the Civil Aviation Training College (CATC) at Allahabad; the National Institute of Aviation Management and Research (NIAMAR) at Delhi; and the Fire Training Centres (FTC) at Delhi and Kolkata. An Aerodrome Visual Simulator (AVS) has been provided at CATC, and non-radar procedural ATC simulator equipment is being supplied to CATC Allahabad and Hyderabad Airport. AAI has a dedicated Flight Inspection Unit (FIU) with a fleet of three aircraft fitted with flight inspection systems to inspect Instrument Landing Systems up to Cat-III, VORs, DMEs, NDBs, VGSI (PAPI, VASI) and RADAR (ASR/MSSR). In addition to in-house flight calibration of its navigational aids, AAI undertakes flight calibration of navigational aids for the Indian Air Force, Indian Navy, Indian Coast Guard and other private airfields in the country.

AAI has entered into joint ventures at the Mumbai, Delhi, Hyderabad, Bangalore and Nagpur airports to upgrade these airports.

== Infrastructure ==
=== Civil Aviation Parks ===
Several Integrated Aviation-industrial parks, for aerospace training, research, manufacturing, Maintenance, repair, and operations (MRO) and Fixed-base Operations (FBO) integrated international aviation hub and aerospace industrial hub, are in the process of being set up, such as in Hisar and Gujarat.

=== Airports ===
While there are 346 civilian airfields in India – 253 with paved runways and 93 with unpaved runways, only 132 were classified as "airports" as of November 2014. Of these, the airports in Delhi, Mumbai, Chennai, Bengaluru, Kolkata, Hyderabad, Kochi, Ahmedabad, Jaipur and Pune handle most of the traffic. The operations of the major airports in India have been privatised over the past five years and this has resulted in better equipped and cleaner airports. The terminals have either been refurbished or expanded.

India also has 33 "ghost airports," which were built in an effort to make air travel more accessible for those in remote regions but became non-operational due to a lack of demand. The Jaisalmer Airport in Rajasthan, for example, was completed in 2013 and was expected to host 300,000 passengers a year but did not see any commercial flights take off till 2017. After the launch of the UDAN – RCS scheme, Jaisalmer Airport got its first commercial flight to Delhi and till now there are around 5 destination connected through Jaisalmer.

Length of runways	Airports with paved runways	Airports with unpaved runways
3,047 m (10,000 ft) or more	21	1
2,438 to 3,047 m (8,000 to 10,000 ft)	59	3
1,524 to 2,438 m (5,000 to 8,000 ft)	76	6
914 to 1,524 m (3,000 to 5,000 ft)	82	38
Under 914 m (3,000 ft)	14	45
Total	253	93

=== Heliports ===
As of 2013, there are 45 heliports in India. India also has the world's highest helipad at the Siachen Glacier a height of 6400 metre (21,000 ft) above mean sea level.

Pawan Hans Helicopters Limited is a public sector company that provides helicopter services to ONGC to its off-shore locations, and also to various State Governments in India, particularly in North-east India.

=== Airlines ===
As of May 2026, there are 5 mainline and multiple regional and cargo airlines operating in India.

== See also ==
- Aviation in India
- CORSIA
- Environmental Impact of Aviation
- Flight Information Region In India
- Transport in India
