= Aviation in India =

Aviation in India can be broadly divided into military and civil aviation. India has an extensive civilian air transportation network and is amongst the fastest-growing aviation markets in the world according to the International Air Transport Association (IATA).

The first commercial aviation flight in India took place on 18 February 1911. In March 1953, the Indian Parliament passed the Air Corporations Act by which the eight domestic airlines operating independently at that time were merged into two government-owned entities. Air India, tracing its origins to 1932, is the flag carrier of India. Directorate General of Civil Aviation (DGCA), established in 1931, is the regulatory body responsible for civil aviation, working under the Ministry of Civil Aviation. Airports Authority of India is responsible for the management of civil aviation infrastructure. As of 2025, there are 33 international, 11 limited international airports and more than 100 domestic and private airports. De-regulation in the 1990s opened the industry to private players who cater to majority of the traffic as of 2025, handling more than 200 million air passengers annually.

The Indian Armed Forces under the Ministry of Defence is responsible for the military operations. Royal Indian Air Force was established on 8 October 1932 with the first squadron commissioned in April 1933. It later became the Indian Air Force in 1950 and is the major military air operator in India. Indian Air Force maintains a fleet of various aircraft and air bases across India. Indian Army, Indian Navy and Indian Coast Guard also maintain air infrastructure in a supporting role.

== History ==
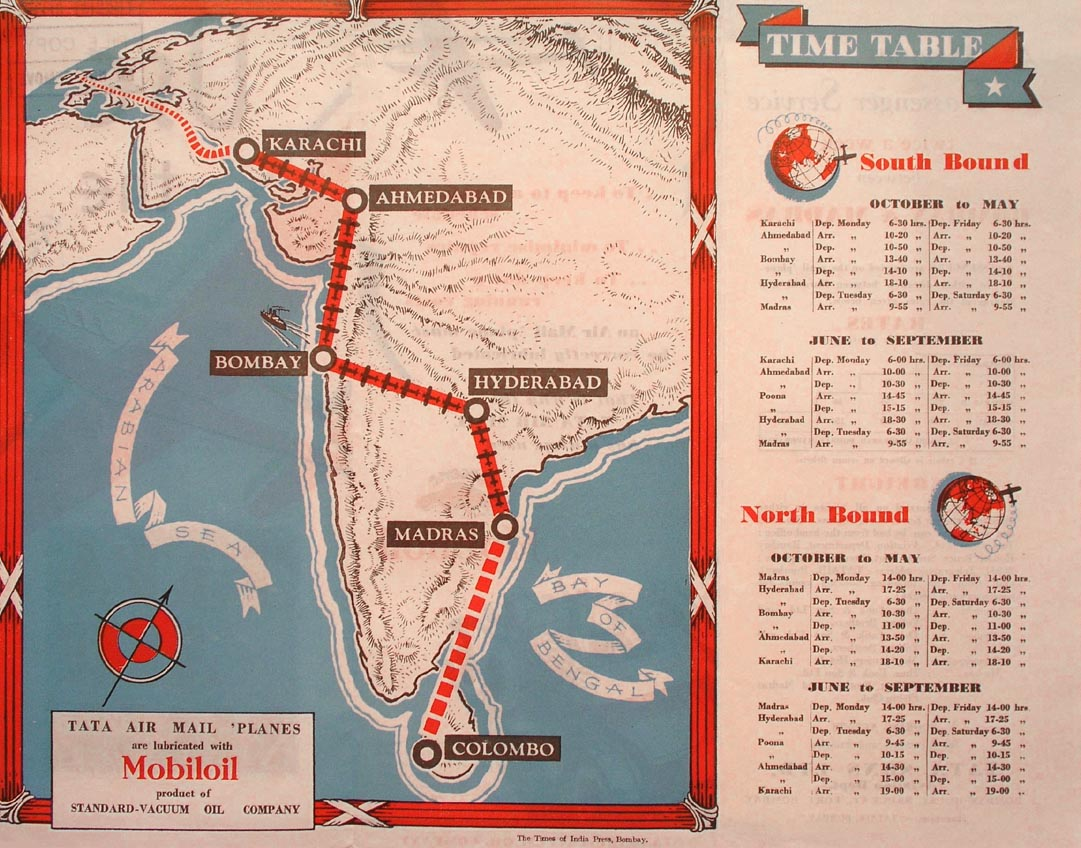
Tata Sons' Airline time-table, c. 1935

The first commercial aviation flight in India took place on 18 February 1911 from Allahabad to Naini, a distance of 9.7 kilometres (6 miles), flown by Henri Pequet using a Humber biplane carrying 6,500 pieces of mail. In December 1912, the Indian State Air services along with the Imperial Airways introduced a London-Delhi flight, the first International flight to India. In 1915, Tata Sons started a regular airmail service between Karachi and Madras marking the beginning of air transportation in the southern part of India. Construction of the first civil airports at Calcutta, Allahabad and Bombay started in 1924. In April 1927, a department of civil aviation was set up with the Directorate General of Civil Aviation (DGCA) set-up in 1931. The Aero Club of India was established in 1927 and the Madras Flying Club in 1930. On 15 October 1932, Indian aviator J. R. D. Tata flew a Puss Moth aircraft carrying mail from Karachi to Juhu aerodrome, Bombay; and the aircraft continued to Madras, marking the beginning of Tata Airlines which later became Air India, the flag carrier in 1946.

The Indian Air Force was established on 8 October 1932 as an auxiliary air force of the Royal Air Force. The enactment of the Indian Air Force Act 1932 stipulated out their auxiliary status and enforced the adoption of the Royal Air Force uniforms, badges, brevets and insignia. On 1 April 1933, the IAF commissioned its first squadron, No.1 Squadron, with four Westland Wapiti biplanes and five Indian pilots. In 1933–34, Indian Trans Continental Airways, Madras Air Taxi Services and Indian National Airways commenced operations. The Indian Aircraft Act was propagated in 1934 and formulated in 1937. In 1940, Hindustan Aeronautics Limited (HAL) was set up at Bangalore and India's first aircraft rolled out for test flight in July 1941. The Indian Air Force took part in the Second World War and was christened as Royal Indian Air Force. In 1950, when India became a republic, the prefix was dropped and it reverted to being the Indian Air Force. In March 1953, the Indian Parliament passed the Air Corporations Act through which the eight independent domestic airlines in existence: Deccan Airways, Airways India, Bharat Airways, Himalayan Aviation, Kalinga Air Lines, Indian National Airways, Air India, Air Services of India were merged into two government owned entities of Indian Airlines and Air India. In 1960, the first jet aircraft was introduced for commercial passenger traffic.

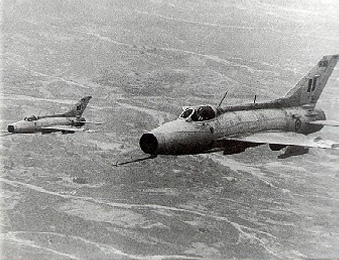
A pair of Indian Air Force MiG-21 during the Indo-Pakistani War of 1971

In 1961, the Indian Air Force provided air support in Operation Vijay as a part of liberation of Portuguese colony of Goa. The Indian Air Force achieved air superiority during the Indo-Pakistani War of 1965. In 1966, the IAF started inducting MiG-21 and Sukhoi Su-7 fighter jets. Indian Air Force played a major part in the Indo-Pakistani War of 1971, carrying out strikes and providing air support for Indian Army and Indian Navy.

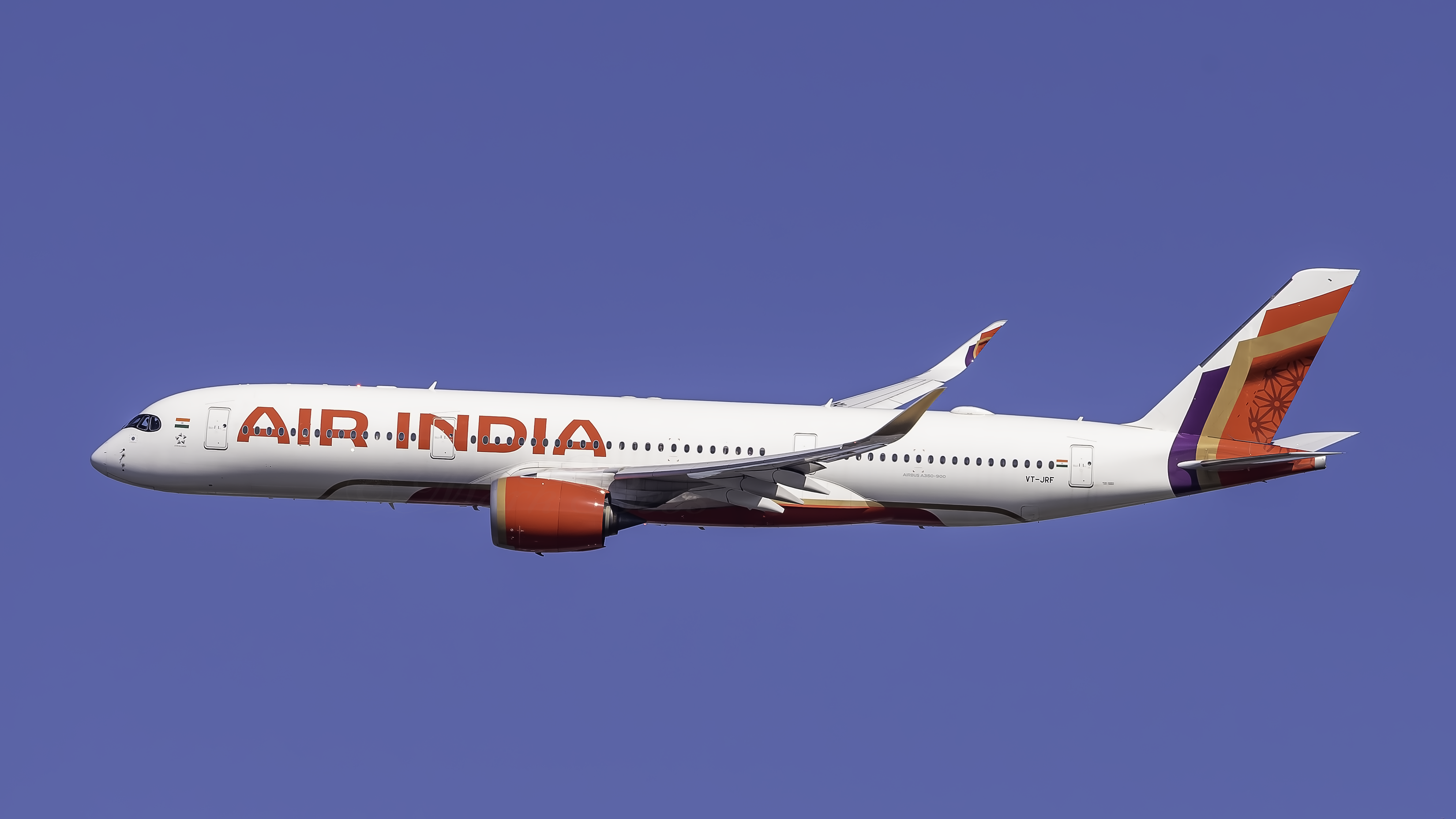
Air India the flag carrier of India's A350-900.

In 1972, the International Airports Authority of India (IAAI) was constituted with the National Airports Authority established in 1986. In 1995, both the agencies were merged to form Airports Authority of India, responsible for the management of civil aviation infrastructure in India. Until 1990, international aviation was restricted to the airports in the four major metros of India, viz., Delhi, Bombay, Calcutta and Madras. In 1991, the aviation industry was de-regulated to allow the entry of private airlines to provide charter services with East West Airlines becoming the first private airline to operate in the country after 37 years. In 1994, private airlines were permitted to operate scheduled services and a number of private airlines commenced domestic operations. On 11 May 1999, the Indian Air Force was called in to provide close air support to the Indian Army at the height of the ongoing Kargil conflict with the use of helicopters. In 2003, low cost airlines entered service in the Indian market with Air Deccan. In 2004, Government of India approved setting up of the first airports with private partnership at Hyderabad and Bangalore. In December 2004, other Indian carriers apart from Air India, with a minimum of 5 years of continuous operations and a fleet of 20 aircraft, were permitted to operate international services. In 2007, the Regional Airlines policy was formulated to allow carriers to operate service within a particular region. The Airports Economic Regulatory Authority (AERA) was set up in 2009.

== Civil aviation ==
The Ministry of Civil Aviation is responsible for civilian aviation, through regulatory oversight by the Directorate General of Civil Aviation (DGCA). The National Civil Aviation Policy 2016 set the guidelines and goals for operations of civil aviation. India is the third largest civilian aviation market with airlines carrying more than 200 million passengers in 2020.

Air passenger traffic (In millions)
Financial year (FY)	2010	2011	2012	2013	2014	2015	2016	2017	2018	2019	2020	2021	2022	2023	2024
Total passengers	77.4	88.9	98.9	98.2	103.8	115.8	135	158.4	183.9	204.2	202	62.1	105.4	190.6	220.4
Domestic passengers	45.3	53.8	60.8	57.9	60.7	70.1	85.2	103.7	123.3	140.3	141.2	53.3	84.2	136	153.7
International passengers	32.1	35.1	38.1	40.3	43.1	45.7	49.8	54.7	60.6	63.9	60.8	8.8	21.2	54.6	66.7

=== Network and infrastructure ===
India has various types of airports namely, designated international airports, customs airports with limited international flights, civil enclaves within airbases, domestic airports and private airports. Airports Authority of India is the nodal authority responsible for the development and maintenance of infrastructure. AAI administers the airports divided into four administrative regions. As of December 2023, there are 33 international and 11 limited international airports apart from 100+ other domestic, private airports and civil enclaves. The UDAN regional connectivity scheme, launched in 2016, planned to develop a sustainable air network in over 400 tier-2 cities across India.

Busiest airports by passenger traffic (2022–2023)
Rank	Name	City	State/UT	IATA Code	Passengers 2022–23	Passengers 2021–22	% Change	Rank Change
1	Indira Gandhi International Airport	Delhi NCR	Delhi	DEL	65,327,833	39,339,998	66.1	0
2	Chhatrapati Shivaji Maharaj International Airport	Mumbai	Maharashtra	BOM	43,930,298	21,747,892	102.0	0
3	Kempegowda International Airport	Bengaluru	Karnataka	BLR	31,911,429	16,287,097	95.9	0
4	Rajiv Gandhi International Airport	Hyderabad	Telangana	HYD	20,996,027	12,429,796	68.9	0
5	Chennai International Airport	Chennai	Tamilnadu	MAA	22,410,000	16,550,000	22.4	0
6	Netaji Subhas Chandra Bose International Airport	Kolkata	West Bengal	CCU	24,68,601	5,12,582	20.8	1

=== Airlines ===
Market share of scheduled domestic airlines of India in August 2026
1. IndiGo (65.0%)
2. Air India Group (including Air India Express) (26.7%)
3. Akasa Air (5.50%)
4. SpiceJet (1.20%)
5. Others (1.60%)

As of September 2026, India has about nine scheduled airlines operating passenger services apart from other cargo carriers. Air India is the flag carrier with IndiGo being the largest carrier in operation with a 65% domestic market share. Air India Express is Air India's low-cost subsidiary.

== Military aviation ==
The President of India serves as the ex-officio commander-in-chief of the Indian Armed Forces, with the Ministry of Defence responsible for policy. The air arms of the armed forces are the Indian Air Force (IAF), commanded by the Chief of Air Staff, and the Indian Naval Air Arm, Army Aviation Corps, and Indian Coast Guard aviation are the agencies involved in the military aviation in India. The Indian Air Force is divided into five operational and two functional commands with bases or stations across various commands. The armed forces operate a fleet of fighter, transport, helicopters, tankers, AWAC, reconnaissance aircraft and Unmanned aerial vehicles.

== See also ==
- Transport in India
- Environmental impact of aviation
- Aerial lift in India
- List of airports in India
