= Airport Security Police =

Airport Security Police may refer to:

- Airport Security Police (Argentina)
- Airport Security Police (Bermuda)
- Airport Sector (CISF), Central Industrial Security Force, India

== See also ==
- Airport Security Unit (disambiguation)
- Airport security
