= Jiangwan Racecourse =

Horse racing venue in Shanghai, China

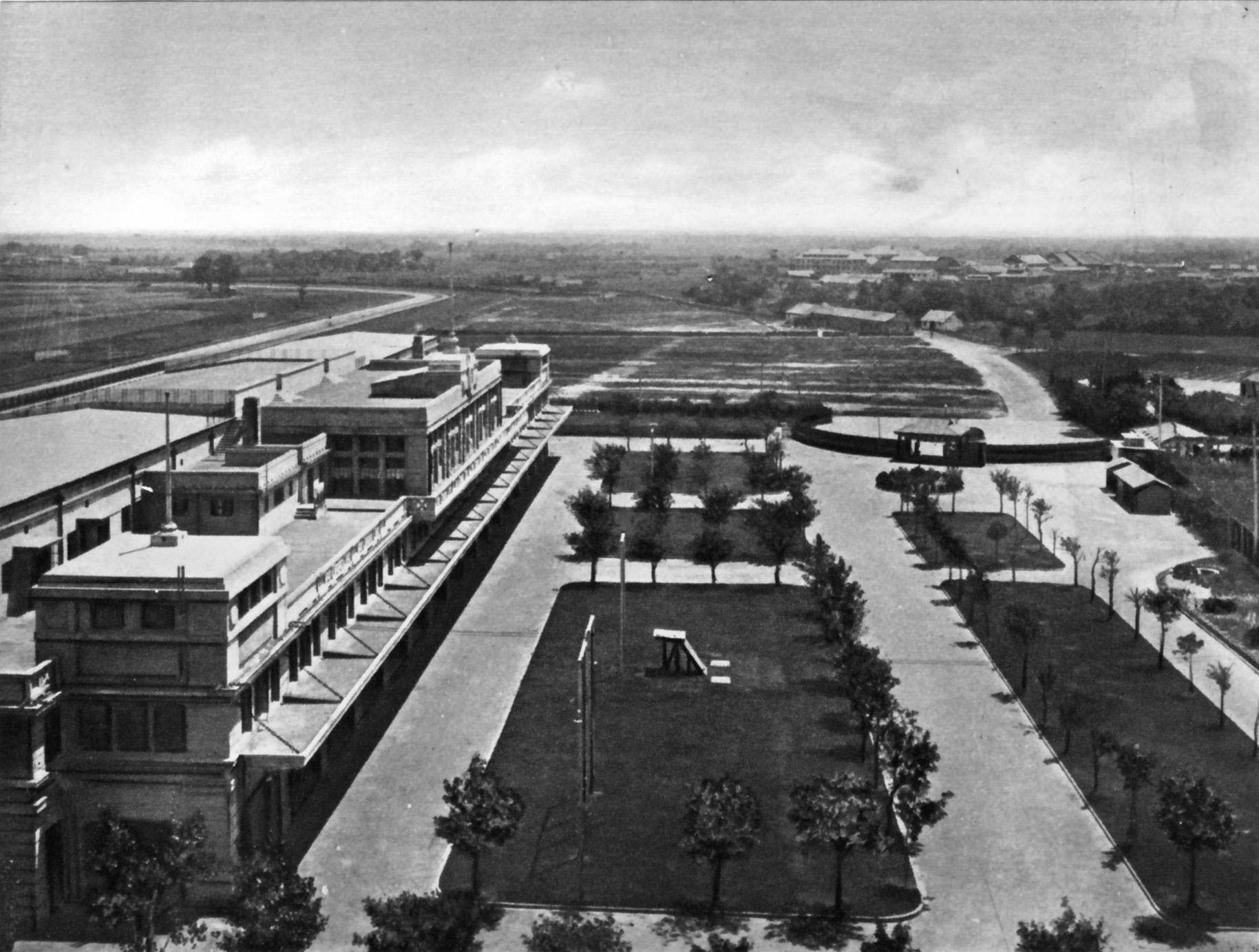
- Aerial view of the Jiangwan Racecourse
- Interactive map of Jiangwan Racecourse
- Location: Shanghai, Republic of China
- Coordinates: 31°18′18″N 121°29′33″E
- Owned by: International Recreation Club
- Date opened: 1911
- Date closed: 1939
- Course type: Flat; 2,200 m (7,200 ft)

The International Stadium, popularly known as the Jiangwan Racecourse (simplified Chinese: 江湾跑马厅; traditional Chinese: 江灣跑馬廳; pinyin: Jiāngwān pǎomǎtīng) or Kiangwan Racecourse, was a horse racing complex located in Shanghai. Established in 1911 as an alternative to the Shanghai Race Club, which did not accept Chinese clientele, the course grew to host more than twenty races a year, as well as a golf course, basketball court, and tennis courts. Beginning in the 1920s, it was taxed, contributing thousands of yuan to the municipal government and stimulating the growth of Jiangwan. The racecourse hosted troops on several occasions, including prisoners taken during the Second Zhili–Fengtian War in 1924 as well as Kuomintang troops during the Northern Expedition. During the Battle of Shanghai in 1937, the Imperial Japanese Army captured the racecourse, which was heavily damaged. The land was subsequently repurposed for agriculture; as of 2000, it is used for housing and industry.

== Description ==
The Jiangwan Racecourse was located in Jiangwan Township, Shanghai, at the intersection of modern-day Wuchuan and Wudong Roads. It extended eastward to modern-day Zhengmin Road, westward to Rende Road, and northward to Zhengli Road. It was accessible from Jiangwan Railway Station along Tiyuhui (now Jinian) Road.

The site consisted of three racecourses, each 2,200 metres (7,200 ft) in length, as well as stands, an eighteen-hole golf course (the "Green House Ball Club" [绿房子拍球会]), a basketball court, and tennis courts. Emulating the Shanghai Racecourse, a four-storey clock tower was installed on the southern side of the stands. To its left was a three-storey building. Also on site were a bar, dance hall, and studio. Eight stables, each containing twelve stalls, were built along the Xiaojipu River to the west. The second clubhouse, completed in 1923, was decorated with teak walls and deep fireplaces.

Outside of the grounds, a 77.64 mu (approx. 5.176-hectare [12.79-acre]) garden containing greenery, rocks, lakes, and waterfalls was provided for visitors to rest between races. This garden, named the Ye Family Garden, was donated to the Shanghai Medical College in 1933. As of 2016, it is the site of the Shanghai Pulmonary Hospital. As of 2020, this garden is the only part of the Jiangwan Racecourse still standing.

== History ==
=== Establishment ===
The Jiangwan Racecourse, intended to be the first such venue to allow Chinese participation, was developed by Ye Yiquan. The son of Ye Chengzhong, a wealthy businessman, Ye had inherited a large sum after his father's death in 1899. Other early proponents of this idea were Zhu Baosan, a local merchant; Xu Lingyun, a compradore; and John Johnstone, a jockey who also headed Jardines. For the site of the new racecourse, a plot of land was selected in Jiangwan township, approximately 5 kilometres (3.1 mi) north of the Shanghai International Settlement. At the time, the city of Shanghai already had one racecourse, operated by the Shanghai Race Club. However, this course was exclusively for international clientele, a situation that the Chinese community found dissatisfying.

Acquisition of land began in 1908 or 1909, when Ye Yiquan began to acquire land from local farmers at a price of 60 yuan (equivalent to ¥6,000 in 2019) per mu (614.4 square metres [6,613 sq ft]); ultimately, some 1,200 mu (approx. 800,000 square metres [8,600,000 sq ft]) of land was acquired. To raise funds for construction, shares in the new racecourse were sold; sources differ as to the amount, with Ye Yiquan's son reporting 50,000 shares at 10 taels of gold each and another shareholder recalling 80,000 shares at 25 taels each (with early investors receiving a price of 5 taels). One early edifice was a clubhouse.

=== Operations ===
Jiangwan was opened in 1911, with a grand gala that featured a Sommer 1910 biplane flown by the French pilot René Vallon. (Note: Vallon put on several aviation performances at Jiangwan, dying when his aircraft crashed at the racecourse on 6 May 1911 (The North-China Herald, 1911-05-13).) The first meeting was attended by more than 5,000 people, and soon members of the Shanghai Race Club were regularly in attendance. The golf club opened on 30 November 1912, and by 1920 was described as Shanghai's best golf course. In its inaugural races for the 1915 season, held between 16 and 18 February, the Jiangwan Racecourse featured twenty-four events with a purse ranging from $50 to $1,000. Facing pressure from the new establishment, in 1911 the Shanghai Race Club began allowing the admission of Chinese nationals, albeit with limitations.

The stands at Jiangwan, 1911

The club's board of directors consisted of Yu Qiaqing as chairman and Ye Yiquan as deputy chairman, with eight other people serving one-year terms under them. Pony owners and jockeys varied; in his history of pony racing in China, Austin Coates notes that "leading European jockeys rode for Chinese owners; Chinese jockeys rode for European owners". Owners included several descendents of Shanghai leaders, including the grandsons of Edward Isaac Ezra and the son of Albert Burkill. In part due to the business brought by the racecourse, Jiangwan township began to expand as new businesses were attracted; several new roads were also installed.

The International Recreation Club, which was also involved in the Shanghai Racecourse, ultimately became a majority shareholder in Jiangwan. Consequently, members of each organization could join the other with prior approval. The facility was also rebranded the International Stadium in 1917, though it continued to be known under its previous name. Several further facilities, including a stadium, were constructed, and the stands were expanded; completed in 1923, they could comfortably hold an audience of 5,000, and even larger audiences were possible. In 1920, plans to implement motorcycle races were announced. By 1924, the International Recreation Club was perceived as highly exclusive, and in November of that year a group of individuals who had been denied entry established the Chinese Jockey Club in Yangpu.

Proceeds from the Jiangwan Racecourse began to be used to subsidize education in 1924, with an amount of 4,000 yuan (equivalent to ¥378,000 in 2019) donated in the first year. Based on the reported tax figures, Chen Yangyang of Sports Research magazine estimates that the course earned some 26 million yuan (equivalent to ¥2,757,000,000 in 2019) in 1926. Consequently, to buttress the area's education system, in 1927 the government of Jiangwan township implemented a tax equivalent to one tenth to one twentieth of the cost of each ticket. This was increased to fifty per cent the following year, a tax implemented because racing was deemed a luxury.

By 1927, the course hosted more than twenty races per annum. These did not stop during the Shanghai Massacre of April 1927, despite urgings from the press, and the meet was reported to be well attended. The course built a new clubhouse, designed by Palmer & Turner, at 722 Nanjing Road W. in 1923. At the time, it was reported to have 1,400 members, sixty per cent of whom were Chinese nationals, thirty per cent were British, and ten per cent were other nationalities. Also recorded were thirty female members. Although the Kuomintang (KMT) government proposed shutting down racing operations as part of the New Life Movement, the taxes contributed by the racecourse ensured its continued survival.

In its downtime, the course was sometimes repurposed; for instance, following the conclusion of Second Zhili–Fengtian War in 1924, the track grounds were used to detain defeated troops from Zhejiang. In 1927, during the Northern Expedition, it hosted a KMT artillery regiment. When a British Army aircraft was forced to land at the racecourse, tensions emerged between KMT forces and British forces at the Shanghai International Settlement. British forces, having retrieved part of the aircraft, were refused access to its wings, and subsequently removed 50 feet (15 m) of railway ties near Jessfield Park. Despite escalating tensions, the incident was resolved without bloodshed.

=== Final years and closure ===
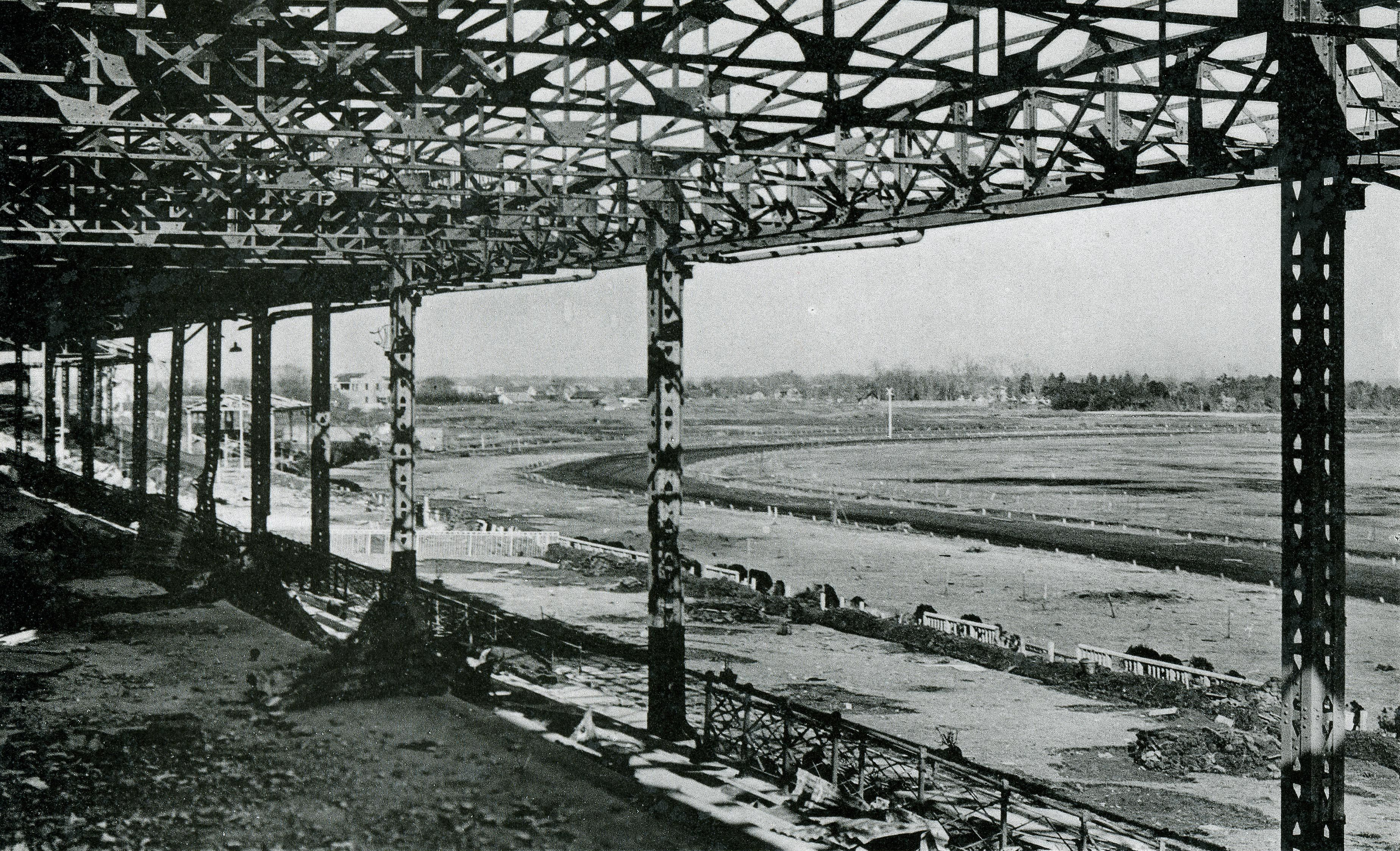
Jiangwan Racecourse after the Battle of Shanghai, 1937

In the 1930s, the racecourse was the site of fighting between Japanese and Chinese forces several times. Following the January 28 incident of 1932, machine-gun fire was reported at the Jiangwan Racecourse as Japanese forces bombed the nearby area. During the Battle of Shanghai, wherein the Imperial Japanese Army sought to capture the city, horse races were stopped. The course was heavily damaged by Japanese shelling in August 1937, and though Chinese forces continued to hold the racecourse through mid-September, after a month of extensive fighting it and Jiangwan fell on 27 October 1937. The Japanese established a military presence in the environs, including a prisoner of war camp located some distance from the track. Held and executed at this camp were three members of the Doolittle Raid: Dean Hallmark, Harold A. Spatz, and William G. Farrow.

Land belonging to the course was subsequently sold to the Japanese-owned Shanghai Hengchan Company (also Nissho Hengchan Co., Ltd.), which converted it into farmland growing soybeans and other vegetables. The company failed to pay the agreed amount, and in the 1950s the International Recreation Club – as the major shareholder – sued Hengchan for monies owing. After the end of the Second Sino-Japanese War, control over the land shifted to the Ministry of Agriculture and Forestry, which used it for a cotton research facility. The land was later subdivided into schools and factories, with the bell tower and main building becoming part of the Jiangwan Machinery Factory. In the early 2000s, these buildings were demolished to make way for Sanxiang Century Flower City, a high-end residential district.

== Works cited ==
- "Aviation Tragedy". The North-China Herald. Shanghai. 13 May 1911. pp. 404–407.
- Bruce, George C. (1938). Shanghai's Undeclared War. Shanghai: Mercury.
- Chen Yangyang (陈洋阳) (5 February 2016). 老上海体育建筑遗存：江湾跑马厅民国时期面貌考 参考网 [Remains of Old Shanghai Sports Buildings: A Study of the Appearance of the Jiangwan Racecourse during the Republic of China Period]. Sports Research (in Chinese). 4. Archived from the original on 21 April 2024 – via Back Issue Magazine Reading Platform and Reference Network.
- "China Marks Time Till Wu Succeeds or Fails". The China Weekly Review. Shanghai. 1 November 1924. pp. 290–291.
- Coates, Austin (1983). China Races. Oxford: Oxford University Press. ISBN 978-0-19-581540-5.
- Darwent, Charles Ewart (1920). Shanghai: A Handbook for Travellers and Residents to the Chief Objects of Interest in and around the Foreign Settlements and Native City. Shanghai: Kelly & Walsh.
- "Doolittle Flyers Executed by Japs". Circleville Herald. Circleville, Ohio. 1 October 1945. p. 8.
- "Firm Action by British Military in Shanghai". The North-China Herald. Shanghai. 20 August 1927. pp. 309–310.
- "Japs Blow Up Chinese Powder Keg Today". Gettysburg Times. Gettysburg. 9 February 1932. p. 2.
- "Kiangwan Race Meeting". The North-China Herald. Shanghai. 20 February 1915. pp. 541–545.
- "Kiangwan Race Course Sold to Japanese". Hong Kong Daily Press. Hong Kong. 15 June 1938. p. 1.
- Liu Enhui (刘恩惠) (3 July 2020). 图考沪城：通往"万国"的体育会路 [Pictures of Shanghai: The Road to "World Sports"]. The Paper (in Chinese).
- Qiao, Zhengyue (22 December 2018). "Honesty Lays Foundation of a "Tudor-style" Shanghai Building". Shanghai Daily. Archived from the original on 24 December 2018.
- "Shanghai Motorcycle Club Formed". The Oriental Motor. Shanghai. March 1920. p. 52.
- 老上海体育建筑遗存：江湾跑马厅民国时期面貌考 参考网 [The No. 1 Racecourse in Shanghai]. Yangpu Times (in Chinese). 12 April 2018. p. 4. Archived from the original on 21 April 2024.
- "The Release of the British Aeroplane". The North-China Herald. Shanghai. 27 August 1927. p. 362.
- Xiong, Yuezhi (2008). "From Racecourse to People's Park and People's Square: The Historical Changes and the Symbolic Meaning". Frontiers of History in China. 3 (1): 101–116. doi:10.1007/s11462-008-0005-4.
- Xu, Haoran (2022). "Respect History, Respond to History. The Historical Evolution of Urban Contexts in Jiangwan Area and the Design Method of KIC Plaza". In Alessandro Camiz; Ilaria Geddes; Nadia Charalambous (eds.). Cities as Assemblages: Proceedings of the XXVI International Seminar on Urban Form 2019, 2-6 July 2019, Nicosia, Cyprus. Vol. 2. Tab Edizioni. doi:10.36158/97888929535675. ISBN 978-88-9295-356-7.
