= Aichi Sangyo University Junior College =

Coordinates: 34°55′13.77″N 137°13′19.80″E

- 愛知産業大学短期大学
- Type: Private
- Established: 1986
- Location: Okazaki, Aichi, Japan
- Website: http://www.asu-tsukyo.jp/col/

Aichi Sangyo University Junior College (愛知産業大学短期大学, Aichi Sangyō Daigaku Tanki Daigaku) is a private junior college in Okazaki, Aichi, Japan.

== History ==
It was established in 1986. Distance course was established in 1994.

== Academic departments ==
- International communication

== See also ==
- List of junior colleges in Japan
- Aichi Sangyo University
