= Amaravati Drone Summit 2024 =

Amaravati Drone Summit
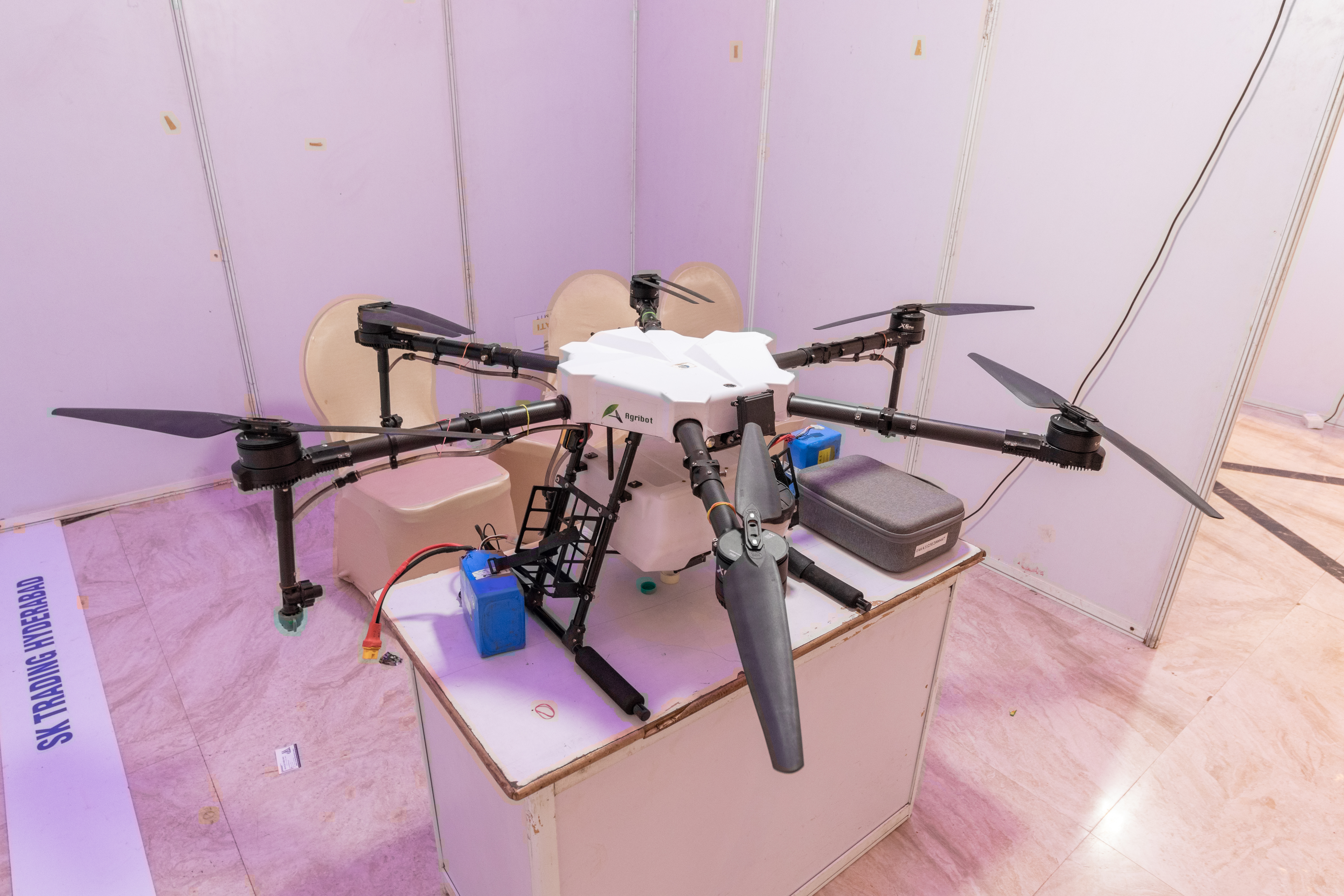
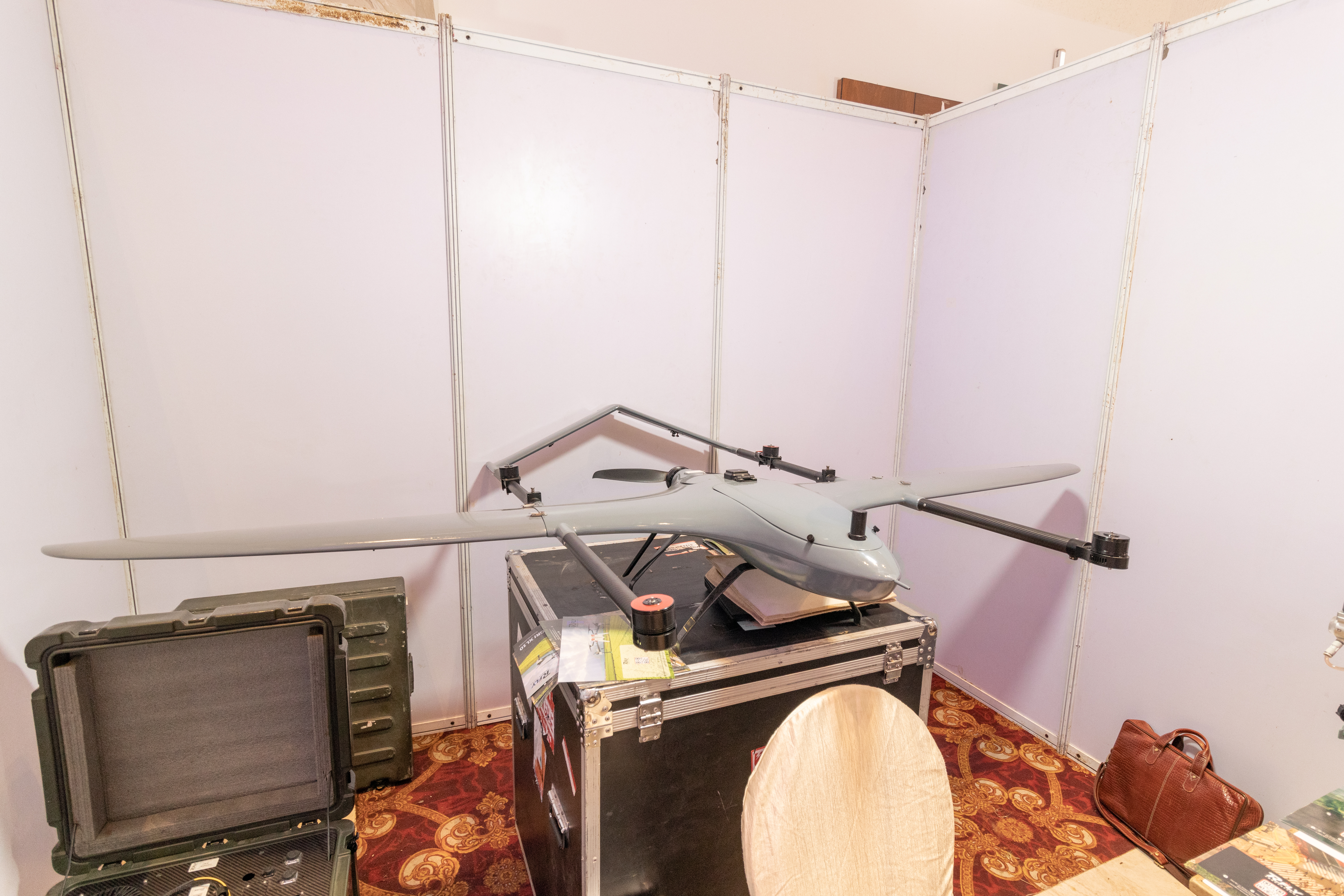
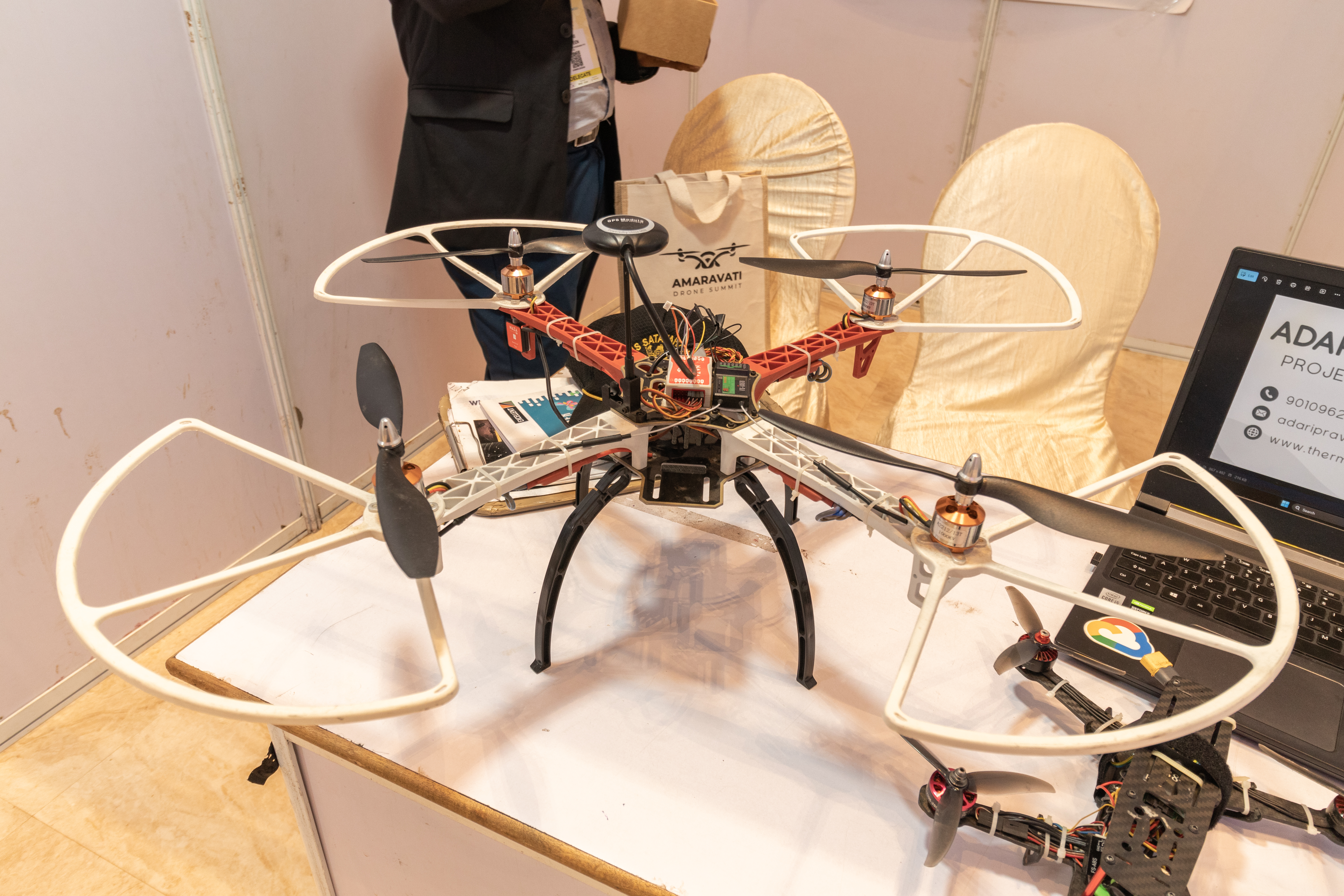
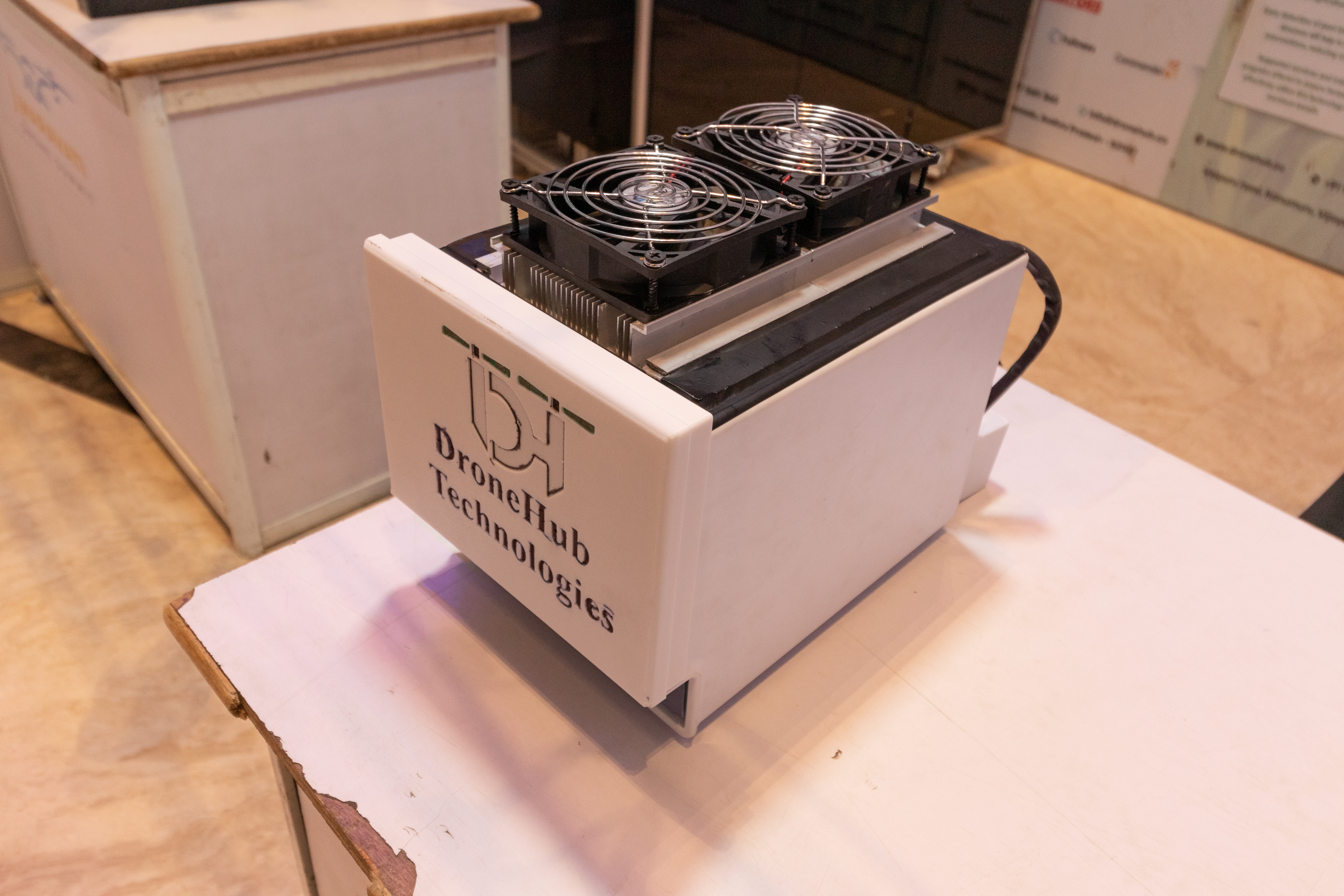
- Host country: India
- Date: 22–23 October 2024
- Motto: Advancing the Future of Flight
- Cities: Amaravati
- Venues: Mangalagiri
- Participants: Government of Andhra Pradesh, Union Civil Aviation Department, The Drone Federation of India
- Chair: N. Chandrababu Naidu, Kinjarapu Ram Mohan Naidu

The Amaravati Drone Summit 2024 took place on 22 and 23 October in Mangalagiri, Andhra Pradesh. It was organized by the Andhra Pradesh Drone Corporation, in collaboration with the Ministry of Civil Aviation and the Drone Federation of India. More than 6,900 participants attended the event, including industry professionals, researchers, and students. According to the organizers, the high attendance reflected increasing interest in drone technology. The summit featured panel discussions, technical workshops, and exhibitions focused on drone applications in areas such as agriculture, logistics, and public services. It also provided a space for interaction between government agencies, academic institutions, and private industries.

A drone display was held at Punnami Ghat in Vijayawada, where over 5,500 drones were used in a coordinated aerial performance. The show included laser projections, fireworks, and music. According to organizers and media reports, the performance was recognized by Guinness World Records for five record-setting achievements, including being the largest drone show held in India to date. The organizers stated that the summit aimed to attract investments of approximately ₹2,000 crore and projected revenue of around ₹6,000 crore over a five-year period. The plans include training over 20,000 individuals as drone pilots, with a target of creating approximately 30,000 job opportunities in the sector.

== Background ==
The Amaravati Drone Summit 2024 was held at Mangalagiri, Andhra Pradesh, as part of an effort to promote drone technology in the state. The event aimed to place Amaravati as a center for drone-related activity and brought together participants from different sectors, including government bodies, private companies, and research institutions. The summit was organized by the Andhra Pradesh Drone Corporation in collaboration with the Union Civil Aviation Department, the Drone Federation of India, and the Confederation of Indian Industry (CII). The two-day event was held at the CK Convention Centre on 22 and 23 October 2024. It drew a wide variety of attendees like students, entrepreneurs, engineers, officials, and others with an interest in drones. Several sessions focused on how drones are currently being used in fields such as agriculture, logistics, healthcare, and emergency services. Some talks also emphasized opportunities for younger participants, including discussions on skill development, education, and startup support.

== Objectives ==
The Amaravati Drone Summit 2024 brought people together to talk about how drone technology can grow in Andhra Pradesh. The Chief Minister, N. Chandrababu Naidu, pointed out that having clear rules is really important if the drone industry is going to take off. During the summit, government officials and industry representatives had conversations about the kind of policies India needs to become a big player in drones by 2030.

Another goal was to encourage cooperation between the government, universities, and the businesses. Representatives from engineering colleges, including IITs, joined to share ideas and promote innovation. The government planned to sign two MoUs during the event: one with the Quality Council of India to allow Andhra Pradesh to issue Drone Remote Pilot License certificates, and another with IIT Tirupati to help with education and training in drone technology. The summit also focused on attracting investment and creating new jobs. The state expects to bring in around ₹2,000 crore in investment and generate ₹6,000 crore in revenue over the next five years. Also a plan to train over 20,000 people as drone pilots, which could lead to about 30,000 new jobs in the state.

== The Summit ==
The Amaravati Drone Summit had exhibitions, workshops, and keynote speeches from experts in the drone industry. Over 6,900 people registered for the event, including 1,711 delegates and 1,306 visitors from a variety of educational and professional backgrounds. This diverse group reflects the growing interest in drone technology and its wide range of applications. Throughout the summit, participants attended sessions covering key topics such as drone regulations, disaster response, agriculture, and logistics. Hackathons were also held, where attendees collaborated to develop innovative ideas and practical solutions to challenges facing the drone sector. The event concluded on 22 October with a large drone show at Punnami Ghat, featuring more than 5,500 drones flying in coordinated formations. The display was executed by BotLab Dynamics and was described as the largest drone show held in India. The evening also included live music, laser light displays, and fireworks, combining entertainment with a demonstration of advances in drone technology.

During the event, the Amaravati Drone Show set five new Guinness World Records. Representatives from Guinness World Records presented certificates to Chief Minister N. Chandrababu Naidu. The records recognized included the largest planet formation, largest landmark creation, largest plane formation, largest national flag display by drones, and the largest aerial logo formation.
