= René Vallon =

French aviator (1880–1911)

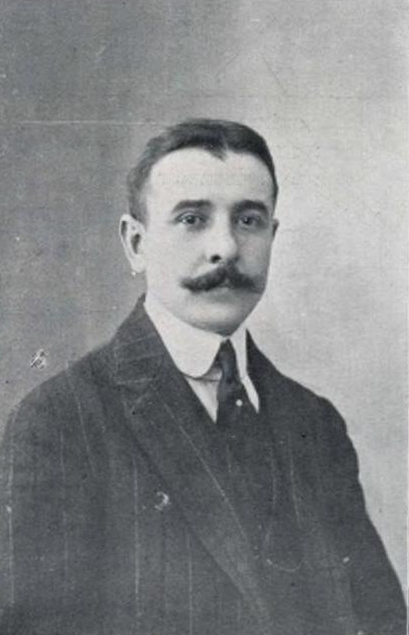
- Born: 2 March 1880; Paris, France
- Died: 6 May 1911 (aged 31); Shanghai, Qing China
- Occupation: Aviator
- Known for: First powered flight in China

René Vallon (2 March 1880 – 6 May 1911) was an early French aviator. Born in Paris, he travelled to Shanghai, China, in 1911 with a group of aviation enthusiasts to promote aircraft sales. He achieved the first aeroplane flight in China on 21 February 1911 at Jiangwan Racecourse, with this and subsequent flights drawing large crowds. He died in an aviation accident less than three months later, resulting in the cancellation of a planned purchase by the Chinese government. Vallon was commemorated with a road and a memorial in the Shanghai French Concession.

== Biography ==
=== Early life ===
Vallon was born in Paris on 2 March 1880, an only son. He took up aviation in early 1910, joining the Aéro-Club de France and receiving Aviator Certificate No. 109 on 21 June 1910. He participated in meetings in Bordeaux, Bern, and Issy-les-Moulineaux. He married c. 1908.

=== Early flights in China ===
Vallon arrived in China on 10 January 1911, part of a group of aviation enthusiasts led by Monsieur Petin and also including Louis Forest. They brought with them two aircraft, a Blériot XI monoplane and a Sommer 1910 biplane, which had been shipped overseas from France. Through their journey, they sought to promote the sale of French aircraft in China.

Vallon and his wife took residence at the Hotel des Colonies in the Shanghai French Concession. Flights were advertised for some days, but due to engine trouble Vallon was forced to delay his exhibition. Damage to the biplane was also reported, resulting in the piano wire being replaced with locally acquired steel wire.

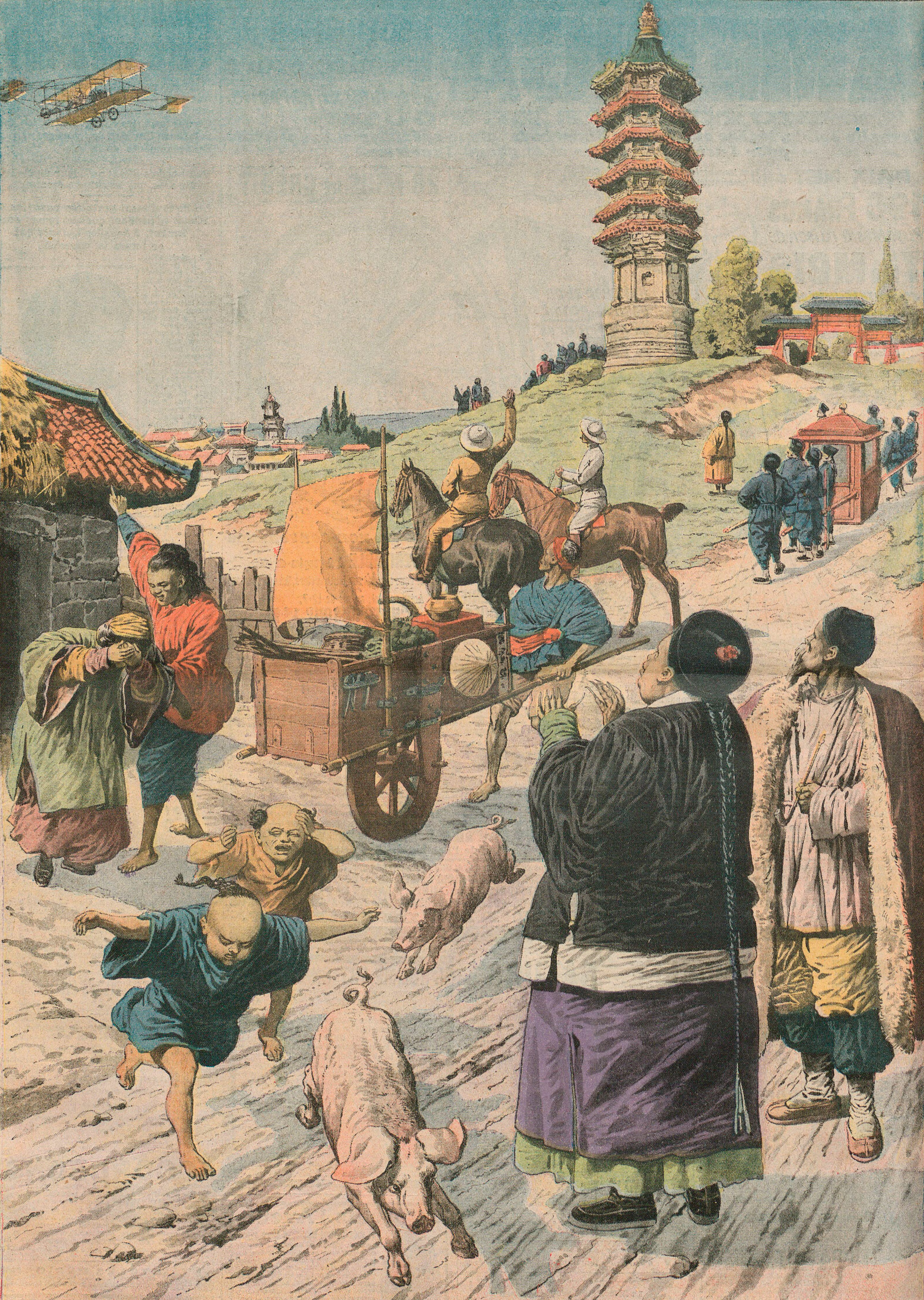
A depiction of Vallon's first flight in China, Le Petit Journal, 16 April 1911

Ultimately, Vallon's first flight for the people of Shanghai was held on 21 February 1911. In the afternoon, Vallon met with a mechanic, and together they tested the wire braces and prepared the motor. Shortly before 4 p.m. local time, the biplane was removed from its storage shed at the Jiangwan Racecourse and Vallon entered the aircraft. As a group of men held the aircraft, the mechanic spun the propeller. As reported by The North-China Herald, "in a few seconds [it] was rotating at such enormous speed that the tornado it created literally swept several of the attendant coolies off their feet".

The biplane subsequently drove forward along the racetrack, achieving lift-off after approximately 40 yards (37 m). Vallon rose above the racecourse, at first following its track before flying over the grandstands. To end his demonstration, Vallon took the aircraft in a figure-eight pattern over the countryside, drawing the attention of people outside the venue. After approximately ten minutes in the air, Vallon returned to the ground. As workers returned the biplane to storage, he received laudatory congratulations.

Over the next two months, Vallon made several flights in the Shanghai area, often from the Jiangwan Racecourse. He regularly reached heights of 250 feet (76 m) in the biplane, and during calm weather would take passengers. Several flights were held in front of General Hau of the Chinese army on 26 March 1911, intended to promote the virtues of aircraft for warfare. Vallon made the journey from Jiangwan to the French Concession on 24 April 1911. Departing from Jiangwan at 6:20 p.m., he made a thirty-five-minute flight that passed over the Bund and Huangpu River before returning to the racecourse. He later received a prize from the French Municipal Council for his achievement.

=== Death ===
The Jiangwan Racecourse held a meet for the weekend of 5–7 May 1911. Vallon was scheduled to make an appearance, but on 5 May the weather conditions were prohibitive. The situation improved the following day, and the organizers announced that Vallon would appear after the races.

At 5 p.m. on 6 May 1911, Vallon lifted off into the mostly still sky in his biplane. He circled Shanghai, passing over the Shanghai International Settlement, and headed toward the Jiangwan Racecourse. Shortly after the conclusion of the "Last Chance Stakes Race", the announcer in Jiangwan called attention to Vallon. As he passed overhead, at an estimated height of 500–900 feet (150–270 m), the crowd cheered his arrival. Vallon crossed the grandstand, circled the track, and made another crossing over the grandstand.

As the aircraft headed toward a designated stand for Chinese audiences, it lurched suddenly. This was followed by a rapid descent, and the aircraft crashed onto the racecourse grounds. Attending police, as well as some of the audience, rushed toward the crash site. As several sailors maintained order, Vallon's body was retrieved from the remains of the aircraft. He was pronounced dead at the scene, and his body put on a stretcher. It was subsequently removed by automobile. His watch was stopped at 5:13 p.m.

The wreckage of Vallon's aircraft

Over the weekend, Vallon's body was held at the morgue. On 8 May 1911 it was escorted to St. Joseph's Church in the French Concession for a Requiem. The procession was witnessed by large crowds, with dozens more joining the procession as it continued. The French consul-general, Marie Joseph Maurice Dejean de La Batie, delivered an address after Mass. It was intended that Vallon's body be sent to France for burial.

Reports following the crash were unable to ascertain its cause, with some blaming air conditions and others deeming it mechanical failure. A planned purchase of Sommer biplanes was cancelled following the crash. At the time of Vallon's death, he had been planning to return to France for other meets. A fund was established to support his widow.

== Legacy ==
Vallon was heralded as "the pioneer of aviation in China", becoming the first person to fly an aeroplane in China; he was also the first to die in an aeroplane accident in the country. Further examples of flight were presented to audiences in Hong Kong and Guangzhou in March 1911, with a Russian aviator bringing flight to other provinces the following year. The first Chinese person to fly an aircraft, Feng Ru, achieved flight in the United States some time prior. Zee Yee Lee later became the first Chinese person to achieve flight in China in 1912.

After his death, Vallon was recognized by the French government. A road in the French Concession was named after him; now known as Nanchang Street, it was home to the St. Andrew's Russian Orthodox Church, French Municipal College, and French Alliance of Shanghai. A monument honouring Vallon was erected in French Park, also in the French Concession, but was removed in 1950. In 2011, a plaque commemorating Vallon's flight was unveiled at Peninsula Hotel, Shanghai. He is known in Chinese as Huan Long (环龙).

== Works cited ==
- Areddy, James T. (22 February 2011). "China Marks 100 Years of Flight". The Wall Street Journal. New York. Archived from the original on 2 July 2022.
- "Aviation". The North-China Herald. Shanghai. 22 April 1911. p. 244.
- "Aviation at Chiangwan". The North-China Herald. Shanghai. 24 February 1911. pp. 423–424.
- "Aviation Tragedy". The North-China Herald. Shanghai. 13 May 1911. p. 406.
- Dépagniat, Roger (1912). Les Martyrs de l'Aviation [The Martyrs of Aviation] (in French). Paris: E. Basset and Co.
- "Fatal Accident to Vallon". Flight International Magazine. 13 May 1911. p. 426.
- "Flight Over Shanghai". The North-China Herald. Shanghai. 29 April 1911. p. 276.
- French, Paul (2010). The Old Shanghai A-Z. Hong Kong: Hong Kong University Press. ISBN 978-988-8028-89-4.
- Rea, George Bronson (March 1911). "Far Eastern Engineering, Construction, Commercial, and Financial News". The Far Eastern Review. pp. 364–367.
- "The Aviation Tragedy". Social Shanghai. XI. Shanghai: North-China Daily: 204–209. 1911.
- "The Vallon Subscription Fund". The North-China Herald. Shanghai. 8 July 1911. pp. 85–86.
