= Airport Security Unit (disambiguation) =

The Airport Security Unit is a branch of the Hong Kong Police Force.

An airport security unit may also refer to:

- Airport Security Unit at Beirut Rafic Hariri International Airport in Beirut, Lebanon
- Rhode Island Airport Police Department at the Theodore Francis Green State Airport in Rhode Island
- Aetos Security Management at the Singapore Changi Airport
- SATS Security Services at the Singapore Changi Airport
- Airport Sector (CISF), Central Industrial Security Force, India

== See also ==
- Airport Security Police (disambiguation)
