= Roger Sommer (aviator) =

French aviator

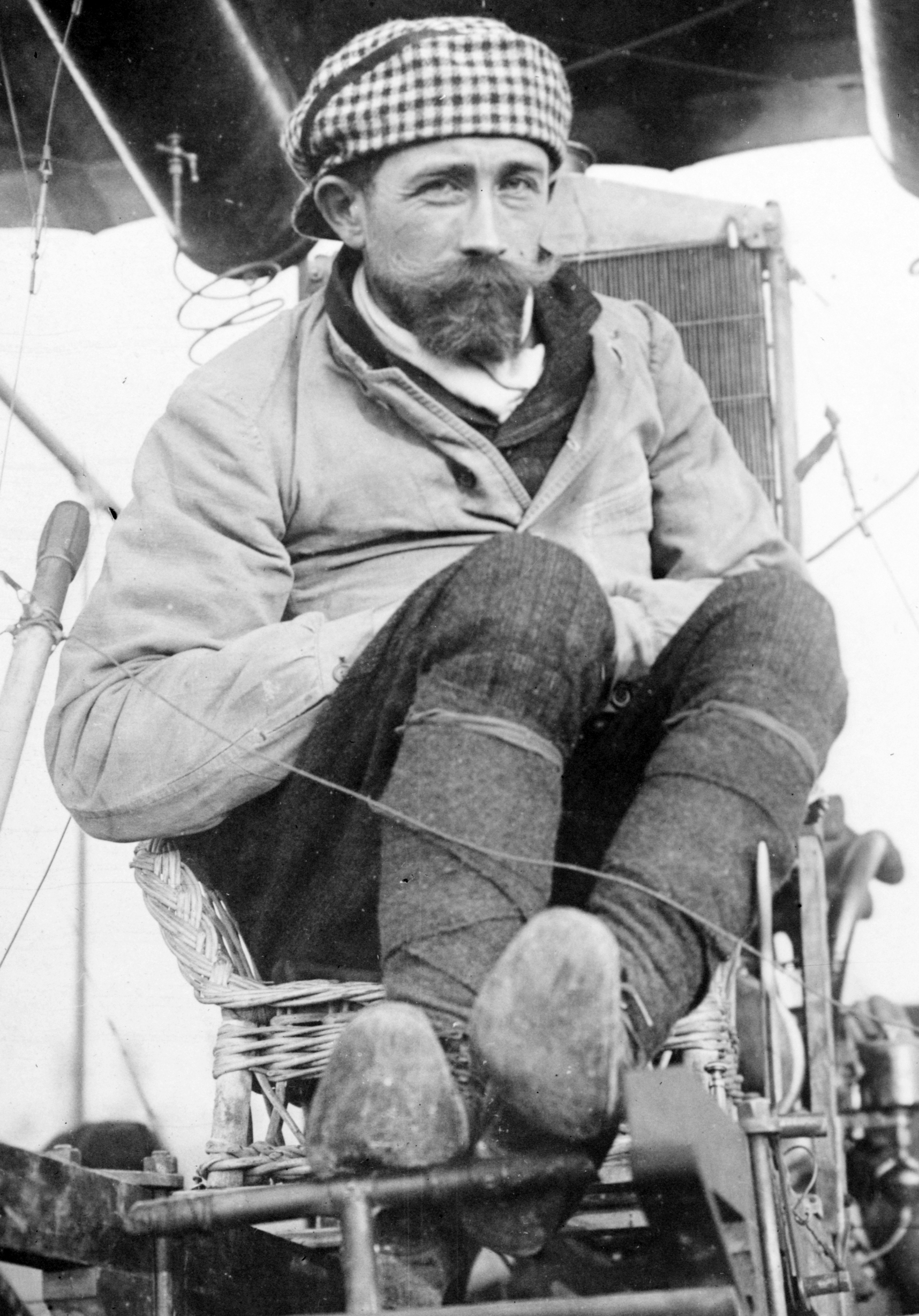
- Roger Sommer in a Farman biplane
- Born: 4 August 1877; Pierrepont, Meurthe-et-Moselle, France
- Died: 14 April 1965 (aged 87); Sainte-Maxime
- Occupations: Aeronautical engineer and pilot

Roger Sommer (4 August 1877 in Pierrepont, France – 14 April 1965 at Sainte-Maxime) was a French aviator. Born to Alfred Sommer, a Belgian industrialist, Roger Sommer became involved with aviation from an early age. He broke the record for flight duration in 1909.

In 1911, Sommer experimented with the effect of different weights on various aircraft's abilities. In February 1911, he made a return journey from Douzy to Romilly carrying five friends; two of the friends were perched on the skids of the aircraft. He then went on to fly with seven, eight, and eventually twelve passengers by 24 March of the same year. At the heaviest weight of 650 kilograms (1,430 lb), he was able to fly just under 1 kilometre (3,300 ft).

After this, Sommer began working on aircraft construction. He constructed 182 aircraft, making him a pioneer in the field. Sommer was a friend of Roland Garros. Sommer's company, named Sommer, is now a part of Sommer-Allibert.

Roger Sommer was the father of former Formula One driver Raymond, and François and Pierre Sommer.

== Patents ==
- 1910 UK patent 13005 (Elastic mountings / shock absorbers)

== See also ==
- Sommer 1910 biplane
