= Asu Temple =

Temple in Central Java, Indonesia

Coordinates: 7°32′S 110°21′E

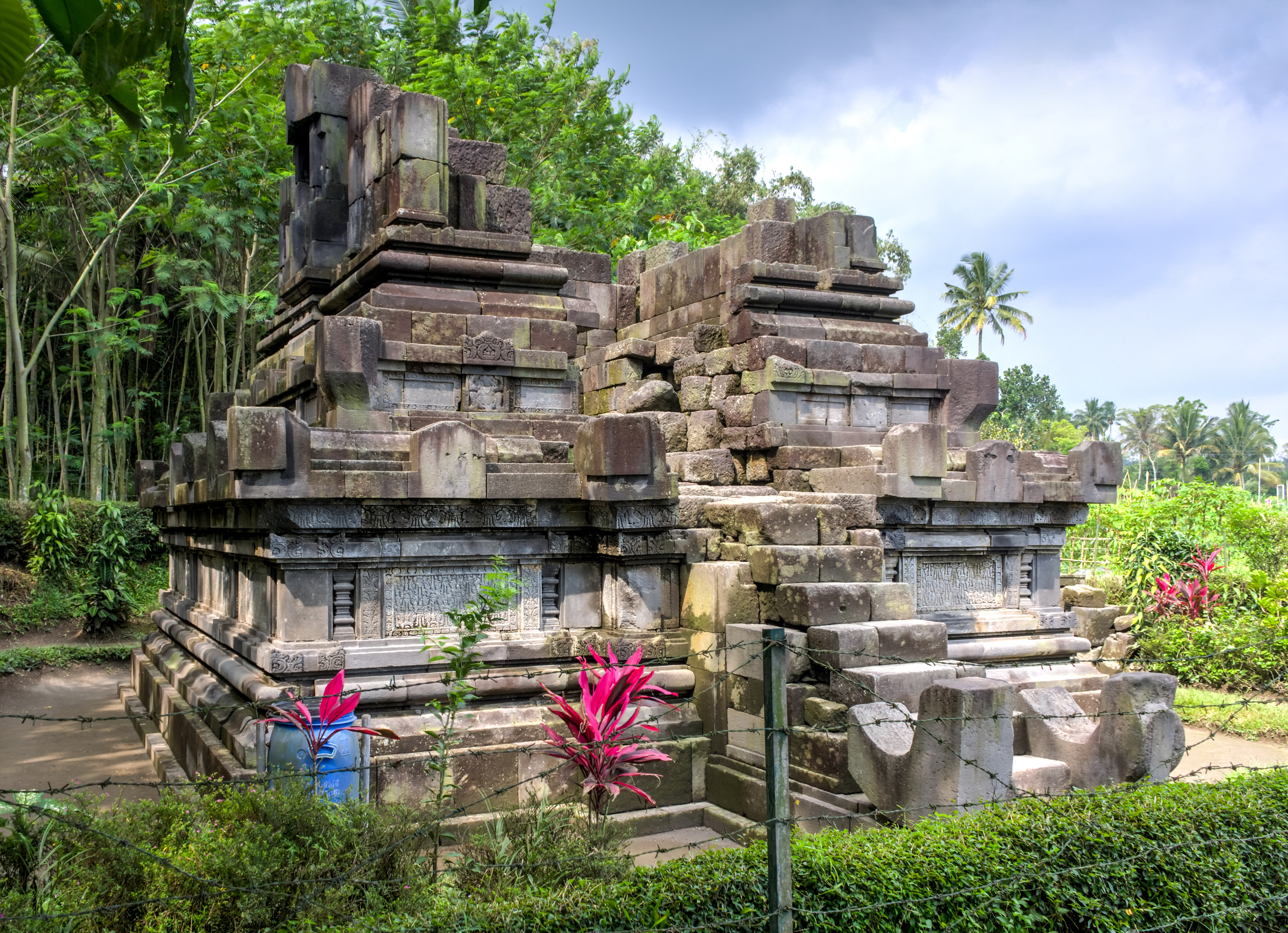
Asu Temple, 2014

Candi Asu is a Hindu temple in Magelang Regency, Central Java, Indonesia, located between Mount Merapi and Mount Merbabu. It forms part of the Sengi temple complex and features a double-wall foundation filled with rocks and earth. It features a distinctive double-wall foundation, with the space between the walls filled with stones and earth. Its structure includes a square base and a western-facing entrance. The temple is also notable for its proximity to ancient inscriptions associated with the Sengi area, which provide evidence of the region's religious and political history during the Medang Kingdom.

== Design ==
An external wall is formed as the base with an internal wall acting as the foundation. Between the two walls, the area has been filled with two meters of rocks and earth, then paved on the top. The remaining space was left for a center statue to be placed. On the western outside wall, a masonry mass was left, forming the stairs.

== Etymology ==
No record gives the temple's original name, and the name Candi Asu was given by local people. "Sengi" comes from the village where the temple stands, while "asu," meaning "dog" in Javanese, is thought to come from a damaged statue of Nandi, Shiva's sacred bull, found when the temple was discovered. The statue looked more like a dog than a bull to local residents. A local blog gives a different explanation, saying the name arose because of the dogs found near the temple, though it also repeats the Nandi account.

== History ==
Several inscriptions were found in the temple area, including the Kurambitan inscription and the Sri Manggala I (874) and Sri Manggala II inscriptions. On the basis of these, the temple is assumed to have been built in 869, during the reign of Rakai Kayuwangi. The Kurambitan inscriptions, found near Candi Asu, record that the temples of the complex were built around that year during Rakai Kayuwangi's rule over the Medang Kingdom. Two of the inscribed stones found nearby are pillar-shaped linga monuments, the Sri Manggala I and II inscriptions.

Candi Asu belongs to the Sengi temple complex together with Candi Lumbung and Candi Pendem, all standing only a few hundred meters from the village of Tlatar. The temple lies on the western slope of Mount Merapi, beside the Pabelan River in Sengi village, Dukun district, about 5 km from the Ketep Pass. It is associated with the Mataram kingdom of the Sanjaya dynasty, often called Hindu Mataram. A local blog about Javanese temples places it roughly 10 km northeast of the Buddhist temple of Ngawen.

== See also ==
- Candi of Indonesia
- Hindu temple
