= Bharatiya Vayuyan Adhiniyam, 2024 =

Act of the Parliament of India

Bharatiya Vayuyan Adhiniyam, 2024 {Indian Aircraft Act, 2024}

Parliament of India
- Long title: An Act to provide for regulation and control of the design, manufacture, maintenance, possession, use, operation, sale, export and import of aircraft and for matters connected therewith or incidental thereto.
- Citation: Act No. 16 of 2024
- Territorial extent: India
- Passed by: Lok Sabha
- Passed: 9 August 2024
- Passed by: Rajya Sabha
- Passed: 5 December 2024
- Assented to by: President of India
- Assented to: 11 December 2024
- Commenced: 1 January 2025

Legislative history

Initiating chamber: Lok Sabha
- Bill title: Bharatiya Vayuyan Vidheyak, 2024
- Bill citation: Bill No. 74 of 2024
- Introduced by: Kinjarapu Ram Mohan Naidu Minister of Civil Aviation
- Introduced: 31 July 2024

Repeals
- The Aircraft Act, 1934
- Status: In force

The Bharatiya Vayuyan Adhiniyam, 2024 (IAST: Bhāratīya Vāyuyān Adhiniyam; lit. 'Indian Aircraft Act, 2024') is an Act of the Parliament of India. This Act provides for regulation and control of the design, manufacture, maintenance, possession, use, operation, sale, export and import of aircraft and for matters connected therewith or incidental thereto.

This Act replaced the Aircraft Act, 1934.

== Timeline ==
- On 31 July 2024, the Bharatiya Vayuyan Vidheyak, 2024, was introduced in Lok Sabha, the lower house of the Parliament of India.
- On 9 August 2024, the Bharatiya Vayuyan Vidheyak, 2024, was passed by Lok Sabha.
- On 5 December 2024, the Bharatiya Vayuyan Vidheyak, 2024 was introduced in Rajya Sabha, the upper house of the Parliament of India.
- On 5 December 2024, the Bharatiya Vayuyan Vidheyak, 2024 was passed by Rajya Sabha.
- On 11 December 2024, the President of India has given assent to the Bharatiya Vayuyan Vidheyak, 2024 making it the Bharatiya Vayuyan Adhiniyam, 2024.

== The Act ==
The Bharatiya Vayuyan Adhiniyam, 2024 is divided into eight chapters, each addressing a distinct aspect of civil aviation governance in India. The structure reflects a shift toward modern regulatory practices, replacing the older Aircraft Act of 1934.

- Chapter I – Preliminary Introduces the Act, defines key terms, and lays out its scope and applicability.
- Chapter II – Regulation of Civil Aviation Details the powers of the Central Government and DGCA in overseeing aviation activities, including licensing and operational standards.
- Chapter III – Aircraft Operations Covers registration, airworthiness, and operational requirements for aircraft flying in Indian airspace.
- Chapter IV – Licensing of Personnel Specifies the qualifications and licensing procedures for pilots, engineers, and other aviation professionals.
- Chapter V – Aerodrome and Navigation Services Regulates the setup and functioning of airports and air navigation infrastructure.
- Chapter VI – Safety and Security Focuses on aviation safety, accident investigations, and security protocols.
- Chapter VII – Enforcement and Penalties Lists offenses and penalties, and outlines enforcement mechanisms including inspections and adjudication.
- Chapter VIII – Miscellaneous Includes transitional provisions, rule-making powers, and repeal clauses.
