= Paramount Airways =

Indian airline

IATA	ICAO	Call sign
I7	PMW	PARAWAY
- Founded: October 2005; 20 years ago
- Ceased operations: August 2010; 16 years ago
- Hubs: Chennai International Airport
- Frequent-flyer program: Paramount Royale
- Fleet size: 0
- Destinations: 0
- Parent company: Paramount Group
- Headquarters: Chennai
- Key people: M. Thiagarajan, MD
- Website: www.paramountairways.com

Paramount Airways was an airline based in Chennai, India. It operated scheduled services, mainly targeting business travellers until it ceased operations in 2010. Its hub was Chennai International Airport and was the first airline in India to launch the New Generation Embraer 170/190 Family series aircraft. The airline started operations in October 2005 with the company headquartered in Madurai. It operated to regional destinations in south and eastern India until early 2010.

== Decline ==
The airline ceased operations when legal issues arose between Paramount Airways and the lessors of their Embraer aircraft. These events caused a gradual termination of all services as the fleet was grounded and seized by the leasing companies.

In November 2010, it was announced that Paramount Airways had won their legal battle and were set to resume services with a fleet of Airbus and Bombardier aircraft. Normalisation of the route network was scheduled for December 2010, but did not materialise. A British court awarded the airline Rs 1,650 crore as compensation in a lawsuit with GECAS in November 2012. Paramount renewed its operating licence from the DGCA in the same month and planned to start afresh, initially concentrating on its earlier stronghold of the southern Indian states and also Mysore, Tuticorin and Puducherry. However, its lenders including Bank of India, State Bank of India, Central Bank of India, Andhra Bank, Indian Bank and IDBI Bank to whom Paramount owed around Rs. 550 Crore, wrote to the DGCA in February 2013, asking the regulator to prevent the airline from restarting operations before it settled its dues.

The airline planned to restart operations by May 2013 with six ATR-72-600 aircraft, however, six banks that had extended loans to the airline wrote to the Directorate General of Civil Aviation asking the regulator to prevent the airline from restarting operations before it settled its dues.

On 6 May 2016, The CBI has registered a case against promoters of Paramount Airways on allegations of defrauding, diverting loan amount, and cheating public sector banks. Searches were being carried out at seven locations at Chennai and Madurai, including residential and office premises of its promoter Thyagrajan and the company functionaries.

== Destinations ==
Paramount Airways mainly provided services to cities in South India. In 2009. it extended services into eastern India, serving the cities of Kolkata, Guwahati, and Agartala.

== Fleet ==
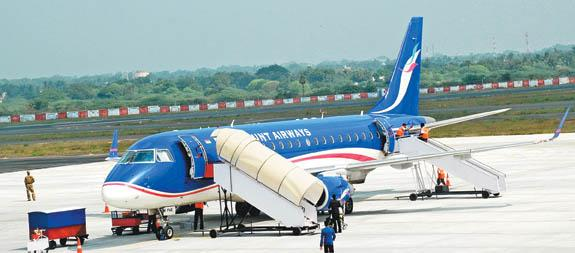
Embraer E170 leased to Paramount Airways, at Chennai Airport

The Paramount Airways fleet consisted of Embraer E170s, and was the first airline in India to operate this aircraft. On 20 June 2009, Paramount Airways signed a MoU to buy ten Airbus A321-200 aircraft with an option for an additional ten. The agreement was concluded at the 48th Paris Air Show and was to be funded by the European Central Bank. It also ordered six Bombardier Dash 8 Q400s. However, the deals did not materialise.

== Awards and recognition ==
- Paramount Airways won the "Arch of Europe" Award in the year 2007 in Frankfurt.
- Paramount Airways was awarded the "Award of Excellence" conferred by the Institute of Economic Studies
