= Airport Sector (CISF) =

Sector of Central Armed Police Force of India

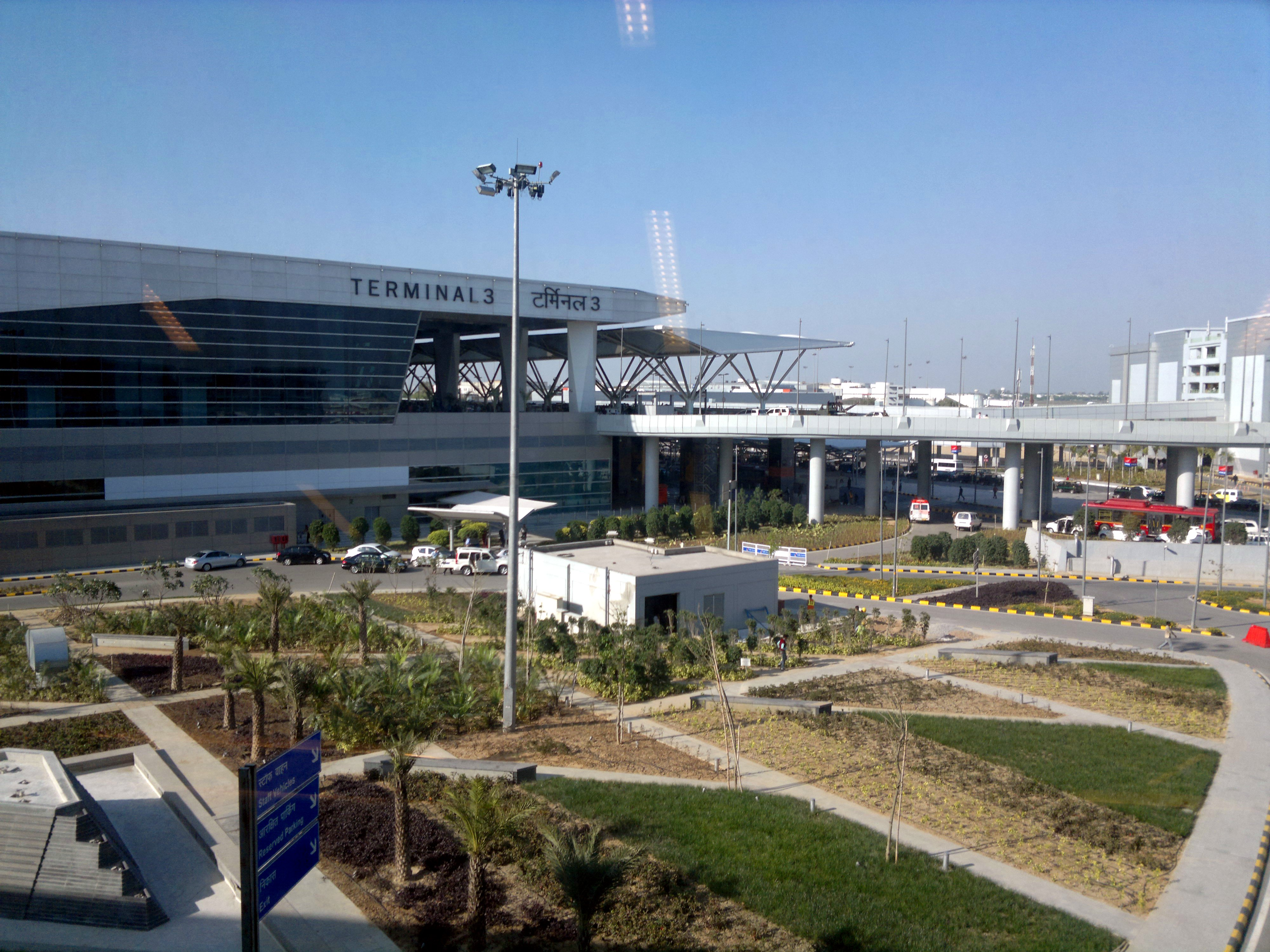
Indira Gandhi International Airport is the busiest airport in India and its security is under CISF

The Airport Sector (abbreviated as the APS) is one of the sectors of the Central Industrial Security Force (CISF), a Central Armed Police Force of India. The sector is responsible for providing security coverage to civil airports in India under the regulatory frame work of the Bureau of Civil Aviation Security, Ministry of Civil Aviation. Headed by an additional director general of police-rank officer and headquartered at New Delhi. Currently Smt Binita Thakur, IPS, is ADG/APS. It is the largest sector of CISF in terms of number of personnel deployed. It provides security coverage to 71 national and international airports in the country.

== History ==
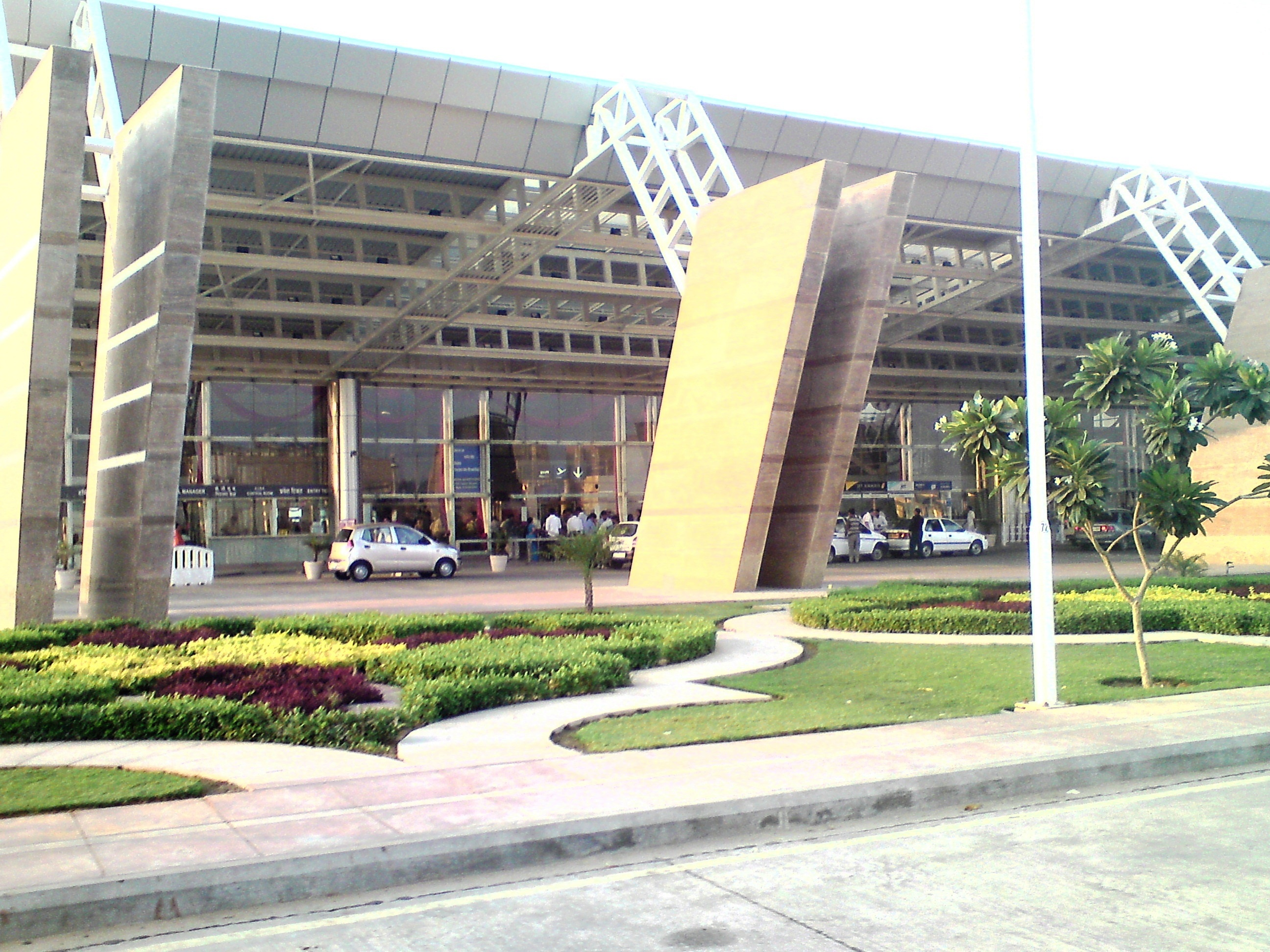
CISF was first inducted at Jaipur Airport.

The security of commercial airports in India was under the control of airport police of respective states where the relevant airports were situated before it was decided that a single agency should hold this responsibility. After the hijacking of Indian Airlines Flight 814 on 7 December 1999, the Government of India decided on 7 January 2000 to hand over the security of airports in the country to the Central Industrial Security Force in a phased manner. The first such induction of CISF happened on 3 February 2000 when it took over the security of Jaipur Airport in Rajasthan. The process of inducting CISF at the different airports was accelerated after the September 11 attacks in the United States in which four passenger aeroplanes were hijacked by terrorists.

== Structure ==
The Central Industrial Security Force is divided into various sectors with each headed by an inspector general-rank officer known as the Sector Inspector General. However, being the largest of all the sectors of CISF comprising the largest deployment of personnel, the Airport Sector is headed by an officer of the rank special director general; this post is currently held by Gyanendra Singh Malik, an Indian Police Service 1993-batch officer from Gujarat -cadre. The sector is further divided into two sub-sectors: Airport Sector-1 (APS-1) headed by Vijay Prakash IPS (UP cadre 1996 batch) with headquarters in New Delhi and Airport Sector-2 (APS-2) headed by Jose Mohan IPS (Rajasthan cadre 2002 batch) with headquarters in Bangalore, each is headed by an inspector general of police. The Airport Sector-1 consists of Airport North Zone with headquarters in New Delhi and Airport East and Northeast Zone with headquarters in Kolkata. Similarly, the Airport Sector-2 is divided into two zones: Airport West Zone with headquarters in Mumbai and Airport South Zone with headquarters in Chennai.

=== Dog Squad ===
In 2021, The DIG of CISF said that the dog squad was 'an important component of the force'. The dogs are trained to sniff and identify IEDs and narcotics. While working with the bomb disposal squad they screen the bags left unattended. As of 2021, the CISF team in charge of Chennai Airport security has a dog squad of 9 dogs.

== Security coverage ==
The Central Industrial Security Force is the "national civil aviation security force" responsible for providing security coverage to 65 commercial airports including the most recent additions to the list Srinagar Airport, Jammu Airport and Surat Airport . It has also taken over the security of Kushok Bakula Rimpochee Airport in Ladakh.The Central Industrial Security Force (CISF) took over the security of the Maharishi Valmiki International Airport in Ayodhya on January 10,2024.
