= Aichi Sangyo University =

University in Aichi Prefecture, Japan

- 愛知産業大学
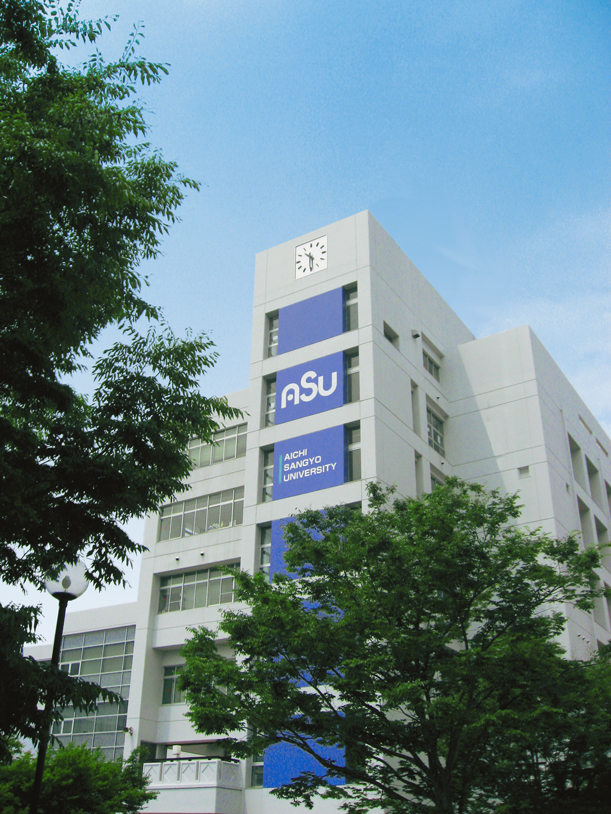
- Other names: 愛産大; ASU
- Type: Private
- Established: 1948
- Location: Okazaki, Aichi, Japan; 34.921°N 137.223°E
- Website: asu-g.net/univ/ (in Japanese)

Aichi Sangyo University (愛知産業大学, Aichi sangyō daigaku) is a private university in Okazaki, Aichi, Japan. The predecessor of the school was founded in 1948, and it was chartered as a university in 1992.
