= Henri Pequet =

French airmail pilot (1888–1974)

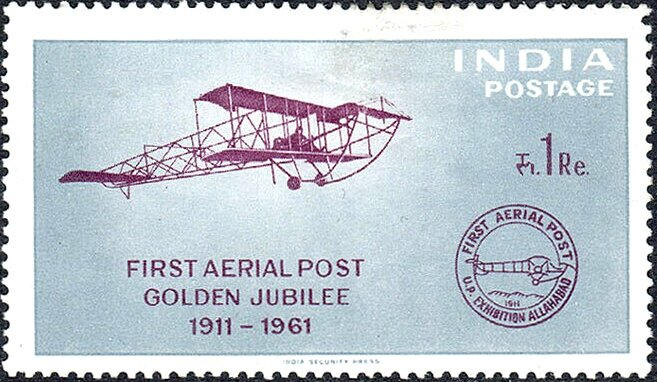
Stamp of India – 1961 – Colnect 238985 – 1 – Pecquet Flying Humber Sommer

Henri Pequet (French: [ɑ̃ʁi pəkɛ]; 1 February 1888 – 13 March 1974) was a pilot in the first official airmail flight on February 18, 1911. The 23-year-old Frenchman, in India for an airshow, delivered about 6,500 letters when he flew from an Allahabad polo field to Naini, about 10 kilometers away. He flew a Humber-Sommer biplane with about fifty horsepower (37 kW), and made the journey in thirteen minutes.

The letters were marked "First Aerial Post, U.P. Exhibition Allahabad 1911."
