= Sommer 1910 biplane =

Sommer 1910 Biplane
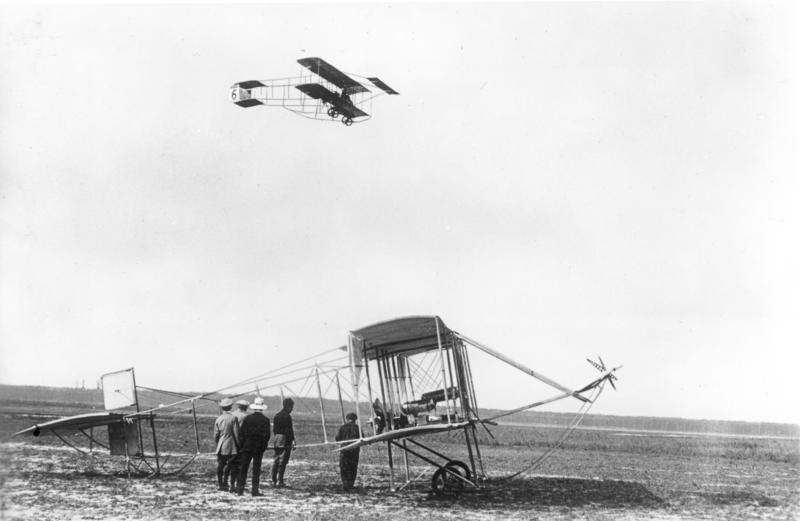

General information
- Type: Trainer, sports aircraft
- National origin: France
- Manufacturer: Roger Sommer
- Designer: Roger Sommer

History
- First flight: 1910

The Sommer 1910 Biplane was an early French aircraft designed by Roger Sommer. It was a pusher configuration biplane resembling the successful Farman III, and was built in large numbers for the time. One was owned by Charles Rolls.

== Background ==
Roger Sommer had previously built an aircraft of his own design in 1908, achieving a few short straight-line flights in early 1909. This was housed at Châlons, where Sommer had a hangar between those occupied by Gabriel Voisin and Henri Farman. In May 1909 Sommer bought a Farman III aircraft, and on 7 August 1909 he gained fame in this by breaking the endurance record held by Wilbur Wright, making a flight lasting 2 hr 27 min 15 sec. Later that year he made a successful appearance at the Doncaster flight meeting, winning the prize for the greatest distance flown during the meeting. Meanwhile, he had started building an aircraft of his own design at Mouzon in the Ardennes, where his family had a felt-making business.

== Design and development ==
The design of the Sommer biplane was derived from that of the Farman III, the aircraft being a pusher configuration equal-span biplane powered by a 50 hp (37 kW) Gnome Omega. Lateral control was affected by D-shaped ailerons on the upper wing. A single elevator was mounted in front of the wings: behind the wings wire-braced wooden booms carried a horizontal surface which was operated independently of the front elevator and was used to adjust the aircraft's trim rather than for control purposes. Early examples had a single large rudder mounted below this: this was later changed to four smaller rudders, two above it and two below, and subsequently changed again to one above and one below. The twin skids of the undercarriage were extended forwards to form part of the supporting structure for the elevator, and a single pair of wheels were mounted on an axle between the skids. A two-seat "Military" version with an extended upper wing was produced later.

== Operational history ==
The prototype was first flown by Sommer on 4 January 1910 at Mouzon, when he managed three flights of over 4 km (2.5 mi) This first machine was sold to a M. Viateaux within two weeks, and by the end of February he had built a replacement and established a flying school at Mouzon. A large number of examples were built: by spring 1910 Sommer had sixty aircraft on order. Sommer had established a flying school at Douzy using his machines.

One example was bought by Charles Rolls, and was exhibited on the Royal Aero Societys stand at the 1910 Aero Show at Olympia

== The Humber-Sommer biplane ==
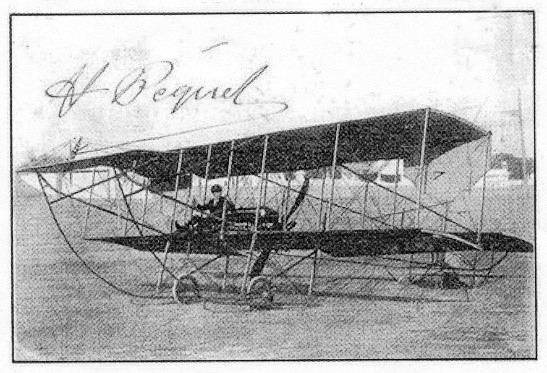
A Humber-Sommer biplane in India, where it undertook the first official air-mail flight

A small number of license-built copies of the Sommer biplane were built in England by Humber. These were of mixed steel and wood construction, and one was used to carry out the world's first official mail-carrying flight, when 6,500 letters were flown by Henri Pequet from the United Provinces Exhibition at Allahabad to Naini. The letters bore an official frank "First Aerial Post, U.P. Exhibition, Allahabad, 1911", the text surrounding a drawing of the aircraft.

== Specifications ==
General characteristics

- Crew: 1
- Capacity: 1
- Length: 12.5 m (41 ft 0 in)
- Wingspan: 10.36 m (34 ft 0 in)
- Wing area: 36 m^{2} (390 sq ft)
- Powerplant: 1 × Gnome Omega 7-cylinder rotary air-cooled, 37 kW (50 hp)
