= Niira Radia =

Chairperson of Nayati Healthcare

- Born: Nira Menon; 19 November 1960 (age 65); Nairobi, Kenya
- Education: Haberdashers' Aske's School for Girls, London; University of Warwick
- Occupations: Corporate lobbyist, Hospital owner and chairperson
- Organisation(s): Nayati Healthcare Pvt. Ltd. Sudesh Foundation
- Known for: Radia tapes controversy

Niira Radia (née Nira Menon; born 19 November 1960) is a former corporate lobbyist whose taped telephone conversations implicated her influence in the allocation of key ministries in the Government of India in 2009. Discussion of the tapes resulted in the Radia tapes controversy, which was a media event that led to the uncovering of the alleged 2G spectrum scam involving former telecommunications minister A Raja. These events led to Raja's resignation and later acquittal by Special CBI court, and Radia's departure from corporate lobbying.

== Early life ==
Niira Radia (née Nira Menon) was born on 19 November 1960 in Nairobi, Kenya in an Indian Punjabi family, her father was businessman Iqbal Narain Menon (the surname is a variant of Manan) and her mother was Sudesh Sharma. In the 1970s the family moved to London where she attended Haberdashers' Aske's School for Girls followed by the University of Warwick. In 1981 she married Janak Radia, a Gujarati businessman, with whom she had 3 sons. In 1994, the Radias divorced and Niira moved to India as a Person of Indian Origin. On the advice of a numerologist, she added an extra letter to her name to make it "Niira".

== Career ==
=== Travel agent ===
Between 1988 and 1993 Niira Radia incorporated a string of travel and aviation related companies in London, in which she and her family members were shareholders and held positions such as company secretary and director. By 1995 these companies had been liquidated, many of them after filing bankruptcy.

=== Aviation consultant ===
In 1994 Radia's father, Iqbal Menon, met an advisor to Sahara Airlines at a party in London who mentioned that the airlines was looking to lease Boeing 737-400 aircraft to expand the business. Menon, who was involved in Radia's aircraft lease business, sent Radia to New Delhi, India to meet Sahara Airlines CEO, Uttam Kumar Bose. Radia helped Sahara negotiate with International Lease Finance Corporation, a Los Angeles based company, for the lease of two Boeing 737-400 aircraft and spare parts.

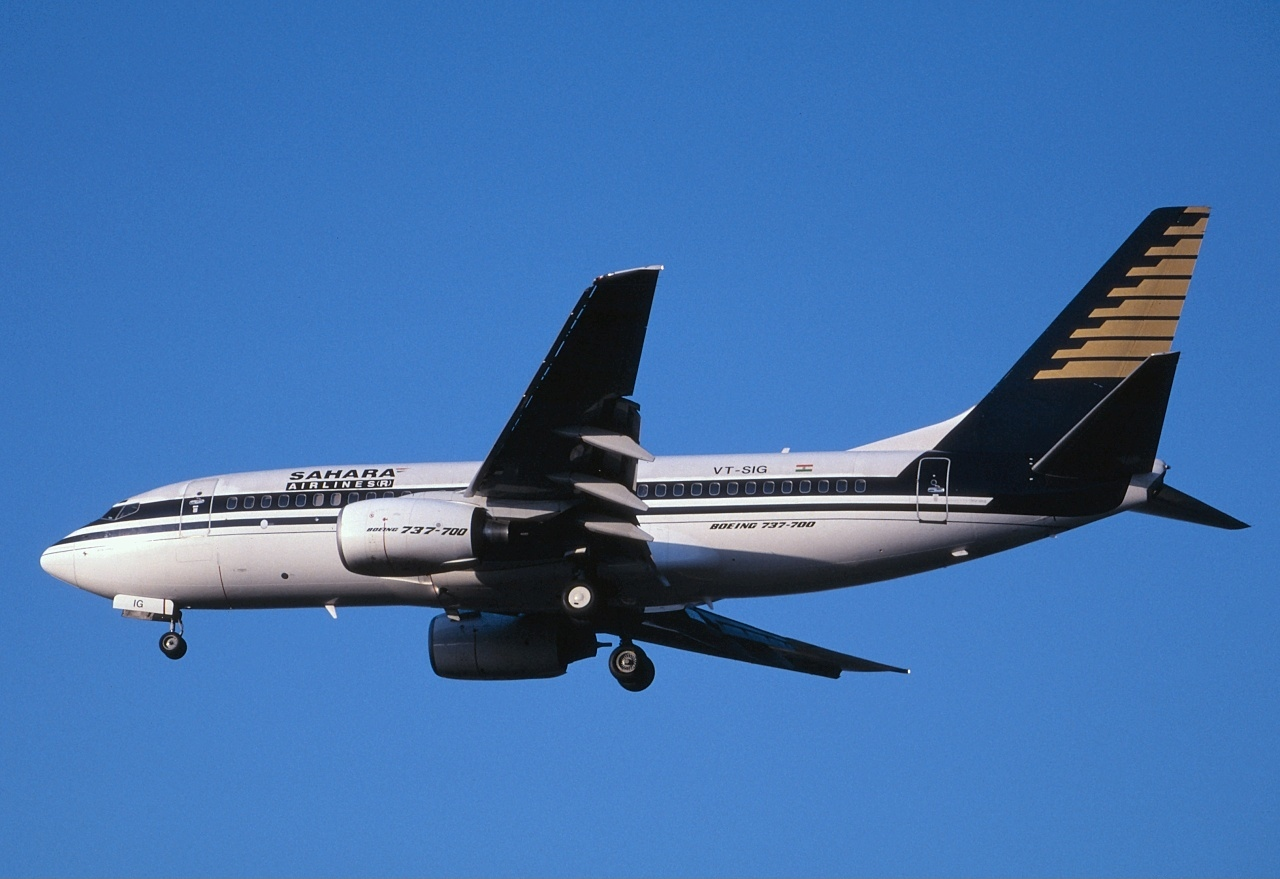
A Boeing 737-700 aircraft operated by Sahara Airlines at Indira Gandhi International Airport, Delhi.

In 1995 Radia rented an office in Vasant Vihar, Delhi. She was hired by the Sahara Group in New Delhi, India as an aviation consultant. Acting as a liaison officer, Radia used her expertise in the areas of travel, aviation, government policies and the Foreign Investment Promotion Board to resolve Sahara Airlines' issues with the commercial department at Indira Gandhi International Airport, Delhi. During these negotiations, Radia met Rao Dheeraj Singh, a traffic supervisor with Sahara Airlines, and grandson of former Haryana Chief Minister Rao Birender Singh.

In March 1996 Radia persuaded Singh to quit Sahara Airlines and join her as a business partner in Mumbai. At the behest of part-owner Chandu Panjabi, Radia was to work on getting foreign hotel management companies interested in the restoration of Hotel Sea Rock, Bandra that had been damaged in the 1993 Bombay bombings.

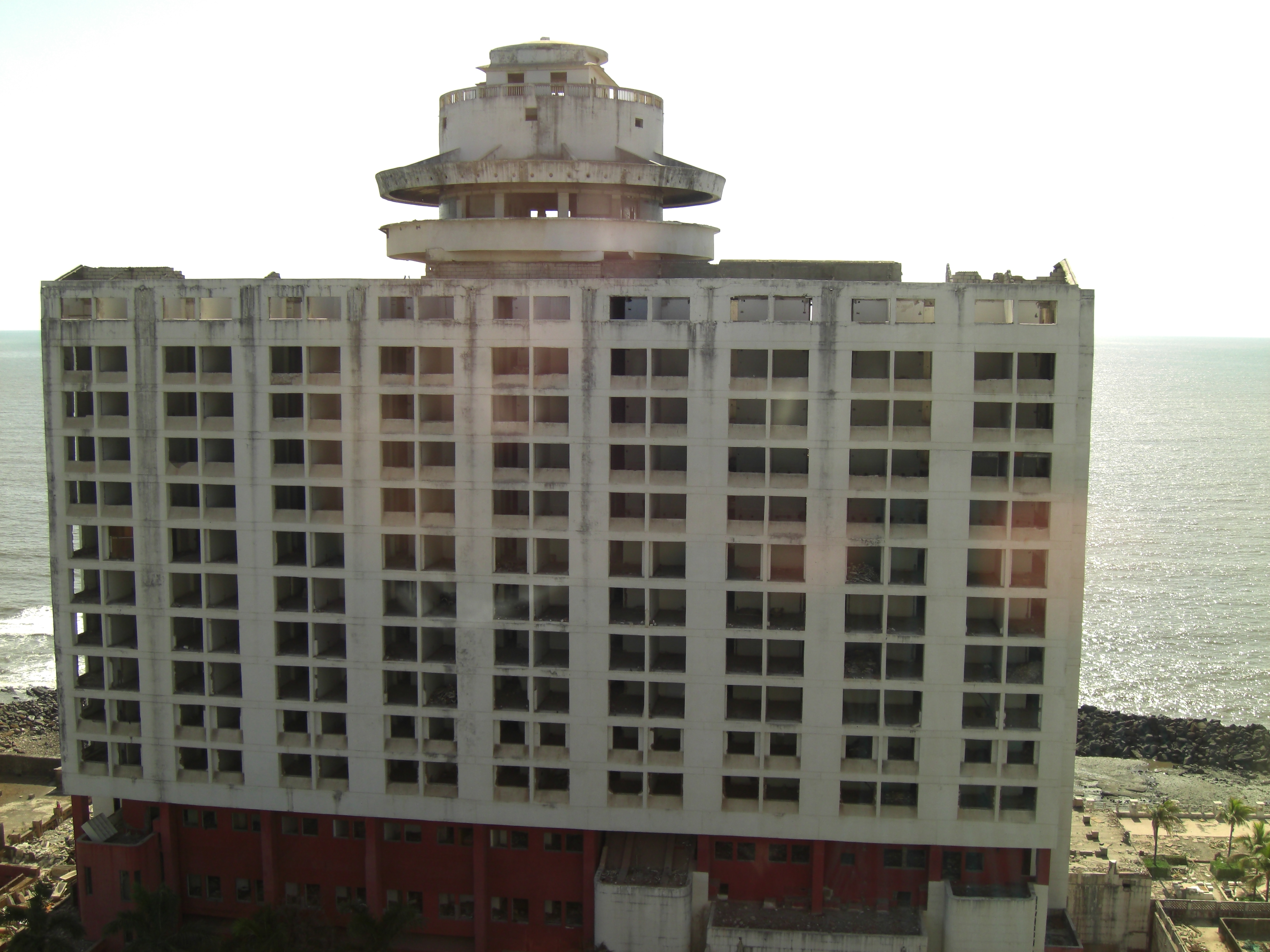
Hotel Sea Rock, Bandra as seen in 2008. It was abandoned after the 1993 Bombay bombings.

While in Mumbai, Radia also arranged funding for Agni Sakshi (1996), a Hindi film produced by Chandu Panjabi's friend, Binda Thackeray, Bal Thackeray's son. In early 1997, Radia and Singh moved back to New Delhi. Acting as aviation consultants, they traveled to Bahrain with Sahara Airlines CEO, Uttam Kumar Bose, to negotiate the purchase of helicopters from Eurocopter.

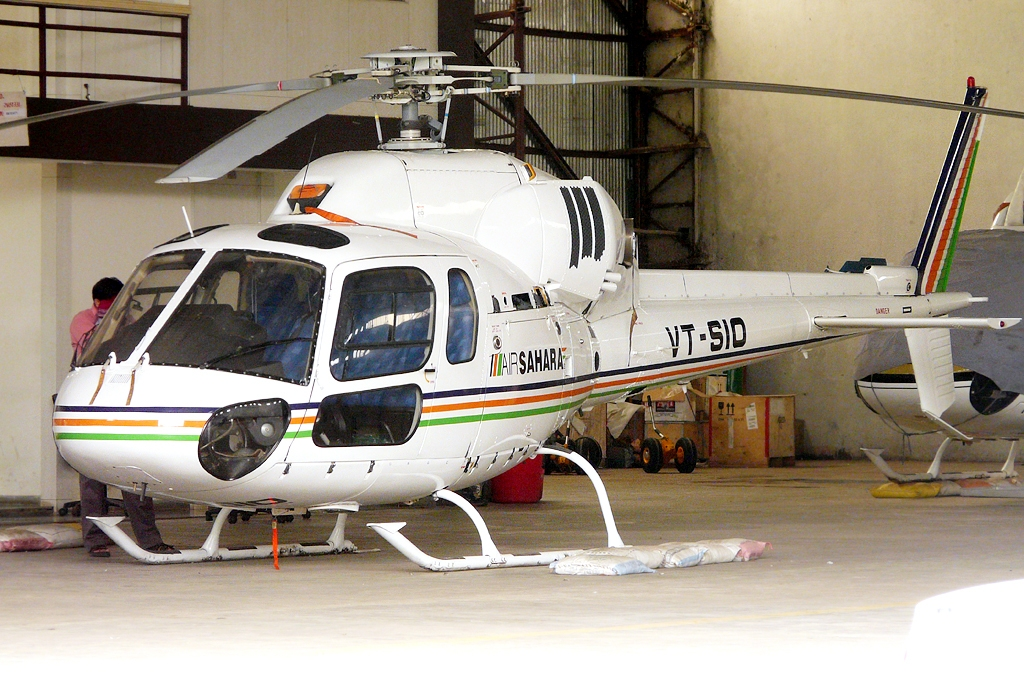
Eurocopter AS-355N operated by Air Sahara as part of its helicopter charter service.

After a successful negotiation, Sahara Airlines placed a $25 million order for four helicopters – three AS-355Ns and one AS-365N Dauphin. The deal netted Radia and Singh a huge commission that they routed through Sofema, a company created the same year for guiding the foreign sales of large French aeronautic and defence groups. To bring the money into India, Radia and Singh made several trips to London and Dubai together.

Following the trip to Bahrain, Singh and his wife, Anjum, had an acrimonious divorce. Radia moved from a rented flat in Safdarjung Development Area to a residential estate in Asola. She arranged for her three sons and her sister to come from London and live in India with her. Singh also moved in with her and Radia began introducing herself as Singh's wife on social occasions. She also certified herself as Singh's spouse in legal papers.

After the 1998 Indian general election, the Bharatiya Janata Party (BJP)-led coalition known as the National Democratic Alliance (NDA) formed a government under Prime Minister Atal Bihari Vajpayee for a year. On 19 March 1998 Ananth Kumar, representing the Bangalore South Lok Sabha constituency in Karnataka, became the Minister of Civil Aviation. Radia became emotionally close to Anantha Kumar. Kumar introduced Radia to Swami Vishwesha Teertha, who became her spiritual guru.

In July 1998 Radia incorporated Crownmart International (India) and became its CEO. KLM uk hired Crownmart to handle the legal formalities involved in the return of two aircraft leased to ModiLuft by AirUK in 1996.

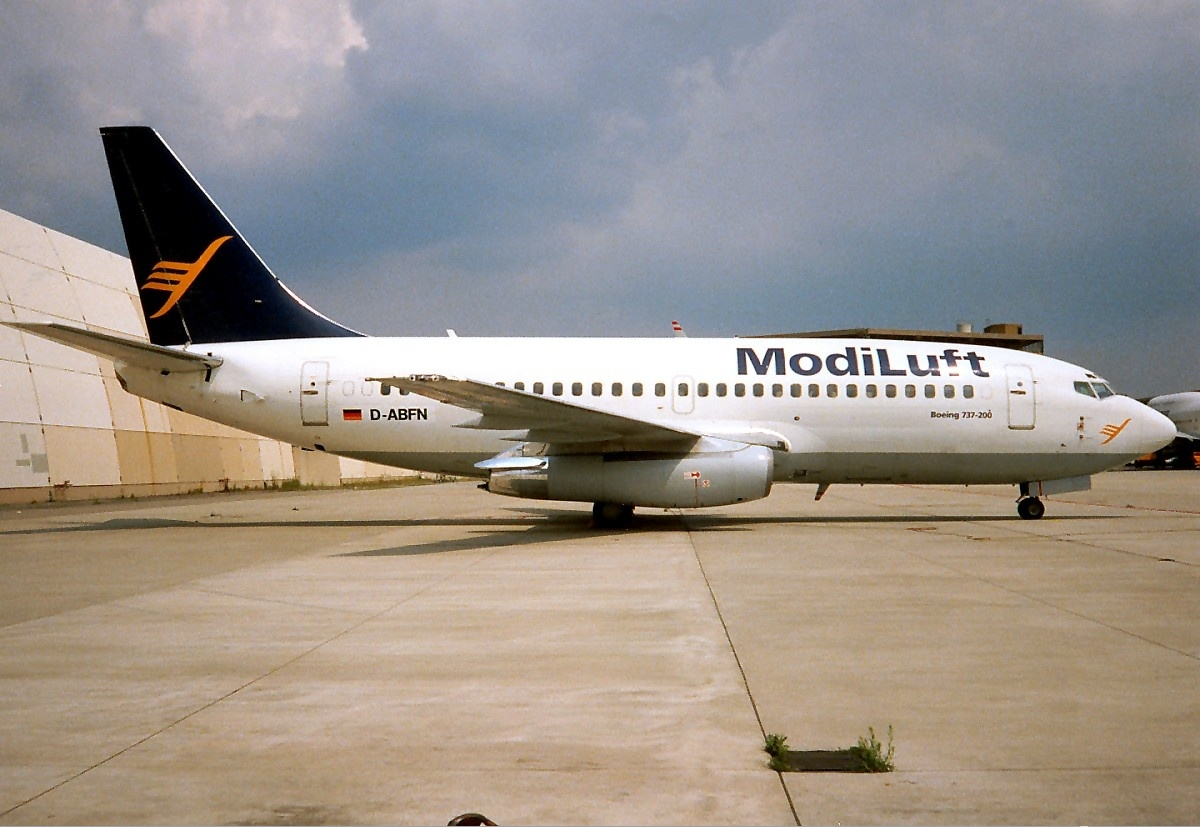
A Boeing 737-200 aircraft operated by ModiLuft in the mid 1990s.

The aircraft had been impounded by the Central Board of Excise and Customs for non-payment of ₹85 million (₹85 million) as Inland Air Travel Tax collected by ModiLuft from passengers but not remitted to the Government of India. Radia and Singh worked with prominent lawyer RK Anand who filed a case with Delhi High Court. Anand and his team of lawyers were able to persuade the court to pass an order to release the aircraft on the condition that AirUK would first deposit ₹80 million (₹80 million) with the government and furnish a bank guarantee of ₹45 million (₹45 million). Radia's lawyers informed her that the court order could be stayed by the next morning. Radia ensured that ₹80 million was deposited the same day and AirUK's pilots took off that same evening. Crownmart earned ₹25 million (₹25 million) as fees for getting the aircraft back into the possession of KLM uk.

After the sale of Eurocopter helicopters to Sahara, Sofema approached Radia and Singh suggested that they help broker the sale of helicopters to the Maharashtra and Karnataka state governments. Even though it was forbidden for state governments to use middlemen and commission agents in the purchase of helicopters, Radia and Singh traveled to London to sign a contract with Sofema. Since a Shiv Sena-BJP government was in power at Maharashtra at that time, Radia asked Ananth Kumar to arrange a meeting with a senior BJP functionary in Nagpur who facilitated the deal. The Maharashtra government, then under the Indian National Congress ultimately bought an AS365 N3 Dauphin helicopter from Eurocopter in April 2001 at the cost of ₹230 million (₹230 million). The Karnataka government did not buy a helicopter after initially expressing interest.

In 1999 Radia persuaded Ananth Kumar as Minister of Civil Aviation to block the approval for Jet Airways to acquire five new aircraft from ATR, a French-Italian aircraft manufacturer. Since Naresh Goyal, the CEO of Jet Airways, refused to deal with Radia, she went to ATR which agreed to pay her ₹18.5 million (₹18.5 million) to get the approval from the Ministry of Civil Aviation. To receive their commission Radia, Singh and Karuna Menon traveled to Zurich to open Swiss bank accounts. They also opened accounts in the Channel Islands, a tax haven.

In April 1999 Radia persuaded Ananth Kumar as Minister of Civil Aviation to change its policy of aircraft acquisition from Boeing to Airbus for Air India's new fleet requirements. The ministry began a formal process of aircraft evaluation for the purchase of 39 aircraft at a cost of ₹90 billion (₹90 billion) but the evaluation of offers was stopped in August 1999 due to upcoming Lok Sabha elections. When rumours began to circulate in the Indian media that India's aviation policy was being influenced by the minister's relationship with Radia, Ananth Kumar was removed from his position as Minister of Civil Aviation.

In 2000 Singapore Airlines was keen to re-negotiate a more liberal air bilateral pact with the Indian civil aviation ministry to obtain a staggered increase in its flight frequencies over a multi-year period. Singapore Airlines approached Radia who got it done. Singapore Airlines was at that time also in talks with Ratan Tata over a 40% stake in Air India and it put in a good word for Radia.

=== Airline owner ===
In 2000 Radia attempted to start her own airline, Crown Air, but the Ministry of Civil Aviation declined to give her permission because it failed to meet the requirements for adequate paid-up capital, ownership pattern, equity base and appointment of a chairman. Radia increased the paid-up capital from just ₹100,000 (₹1,00,000) to ₹300 million (₹30 million); clarified that she and her sister, Karuna Menon, were the promoters; obtained approval from the Foreign Investment Promotion Board (FIPB) and the Home ministry to raise equity abroad; and started negotiations with International Lease Finance Corporation to obtain aircraft. However, her application was declined again for lack of transparency in funding.

In August 2000 Uttam Kumar Bose was sacked as CEO of Sahara Airlines after aircraft lease rentals negotiated by him were found to be as much as 50 percent higher than market rates. He joined Crown Air as CEO but went back to Sahara after nine months.

In 2004 Radia tried once again to start her own airline by taking over the defunct ModiLuft and renaming it Magic Air. Uttam Kumar Bose once again quit Sahara Airlines to help launch Magic Air. Radia failed to get permission because of her foreign citizenship and rules forbidding foreign investment in Indian domestic aviation.

=== PR Veteran ===
Also see Radia tapes controversy

In 2000 Ratan Tata, fresh from the failure to obtain a stake in Air India along with Singapore Airlines, decided to consolidate the public relations and advocacy functions for the Tata Group as a whole. Impressed by her smooth handling of the Singapore Airlines bilateral pact with India, Tata offered all 90 Tata Group accounts to Radia, who set up Vaishnavi Corporate Communications Pvt Ltd (VCCPL) in 2001 for public relations work. Apart from the Tata Group Radia also handled clients such as Unitech Group, Confederation of Indian Industry, Hindustan Construction Company and the GMR Group.

From 2005 to 2009 Radia head-hunted a number of senior Indian bureaucrats. In 2005 she hired Satish Kumar Narula, former chairman of the Airports Authority of India (AAI), who had retired in January 2004. He joined Vaishnavi Communications as a company director. Former secretary of the Department of Industrial Policy and Promotion (DIPP), Ajay Dua, former secretary, Ministry of Civil Aviation Akbar Jung, and former Secretary, Ministry of New and Renewable Energy, V. Subramanian, also joined Vaishnavi Communications for a brief period of four months each in 2009.

In 2007, Radia incorporated Noesis Strategic Consulting Services Pvt. Ltd. with former Finance Secretary CM Vasudev and former chairman of the Telecom Regulatory Authority of India (TRAI), Pradip Baijal, as its founding members. In 2008 former TRAI member DPS Seth worked with Noesis as an advisor. Noesis' clients included Tata Teleservices, Tata Communications, Vedanta Resources, and the government of Oman. In 2008 Mukesh Ambani also decided to outsource all of Reliance Industries public relations and lobbying work to Radia, who set up Neucom Consulting just for this purpose. In 2009, the tapes formed the foundation of the 2G spectrum case in which the government was accused of selling scarce radio spectrum at throwaway prices to ineligible companies. The national auditor pegged potential revenue loss at ₹1760 billion (₹1,760 billion).

In 2011, following the Radia tapes controversy, Radia announced her exit from corporate lobbying and closed down Vaishnavi Communications. In 2012, she started a consulting firm called Pegasus International Advisory. In February 2012, the SC cancelled 122 2G licences. In 2010 India Today magazine sardonically named Niira Radia as the newsmaker of the year.

=== Sudesh Foundation ===
In 2002 Radia established a charitable trust called Sudesh Foundation in her late mother Sudesh Sharma's memory. The foundation funded the construction of a Pejavara Adokshaja muth Sri Krishna temple at Vasant Kunj, an expensive area of Delhi, for which land was allocated by the government at very low prices. At a function in 2002 Pejavara Swami Vishwesha Teertha was present, along with senior BJP leader L. K. Advani who lay the foundation stone for the temple. The foundation had helped scholars publish books and devotional singers get their music CDs released.

=== Nayati Healthcare ===
Nayati Healthcare started out with its mobile van services in 2012 and on 20 February 2013 Niira Radia incorporated Nayati Healthcare & Research Pvt. Ltd. as a non-governmental organisation (NGO) with her sister, Karuna Menon and herself as company directors and built a hospital in Mathura of the same name.

On 28 February 2016 Ratan Tata inaugurated Nayati Healthcare's first hospital in Mathura, a district in Uttar Pradesh. The hospital further expanded its territory to New Delhi and Gurugram in 2018, by acquiring local hospitals – Sunder lal Jain hospital and Vimhans PrimaMed.

== Controversy ==
=== Kidnapping of son ===
On 28 April 2003 Rao Dheeraj Singh, Radia's former business partner, was arrested by Delhi Police for allegedly kidnapping Niira Radia's teenage son. The police also searched Singh's office and took away all files in his possession relating to Radia's business dealings. Singh was charged under Indian Penal Code Sections 364A, 365, 307, 120B/34. Singh spent nearly a year and a half in jail before lawyer RK Anand filed bail for him. In 2011 Singh gave an interview to a media channel in which he portrayed the kidnapping charge against him as the outcome of a business rivalry between him and Radia. Radia's son filed contempt of court charges against Singh as the case against him was still pending.

=== Biography by RK Anand ===
In May 2011 Radia filed a defamation suit against lawyer RK Anand for his book titled Close Encounters of Niira Radia and described as an unauthorised "tell all" biography about Niira Radia and her activities as a corporate lobbyist. Radia demanded ₹10 million (₹10 million) as damages, alleging that Anand had revealed "privileged communications" between a lawyer and a client.

Delhi High Court stayed the release and circulation of the book, originally slated for a launch in June 2011.

=== Taped conversations ===
Over a six-month period in 2009 India's Income Tax department taped Radia's phone conversations at the time of cabinet formation after general elections. A news magazine published transcripts of the taped conversations that implicated Radia's influence in how key ministerial portfolios were allocated. These phone recordings led to the 2G spectrum case involving former telecommunications minister A Raja, which subsequently led to his resignation from his post. A report filed by the Serious Fraud Investigation Office (SFIO) in April 2013 based on its investigation into the tapes pointed out technical violations by Radia's public relations and lobbying firm Vaishnavi Corporate Communications Limited under the Companies Act, 1956 and recommended action against 11 top executives of the firm.

=== Panama Papers ===
Mossack Fonseca had set up firm linked to Niira Radia. An investigation of these papers shows the existence of one offshore entity owned by Radia, an International Business Company (IBC) registered in the British Virgin Islands (BVI) by Mossack Fonseka in 1994 named Crownmart International Group Limited. It was before she changed her name, evidently on the advice of her astrologers, and added another "i" to it. But Mossack Fonseca (MF) documents, investigated by The Indian Express, show her name simply as Nira Radia and establish that the PR professional whose telephone intercepts became public in 2010 managed an offshore account.

=== Yes Bank 3 billion cheating case ===
In October 2021, the Economic Offences Wing of Delhi Police summoned Niira in connection with a 3 billion case of cheating Yes Bank for a ₹3 billion loan.
