= Guiscard (disambiguation) =

Guiscard may refer to:

- Guiscard, commune in the Oise department in northern France
- Guiscard (name)
