= Sofema =

French company

Sofema (Société française d’exportation de matériel militaire et aéronautique) is a French company which specialises today in the renovation, marketing and maintenance of first generation land, sea and air equipment, mainly from material sourced from the French Armed Forces.

The company is headquartered in Levallois, near Paris. Technical facilities are situated in La Teste (Gironde—in the south west of France) and Châteauroux (Indre). Sofema was used by Indian lobbyist Niira Radia and Singh for routing their money which they earned as commission in the deal with Sahara Airlines to negotiate the purchase of helicopters from Eurocopter.

== History ==
Sofema was created in 1997 from the merger of two utility companies (Ofema and Sofma), responsible for supporting and guiding the foreign sales of large French aeronautic and defence groups.

Its first President (until 2001) was the Préfet Ivan Barbot (former president of Ofema) who oversaw the privatisation of the company in 1998 around a core group of important shareholders including EADS, Safran (born from the merger of Snecma and SAGEM), DCNS, Thales, NEXTER SYSTEMS (formerly GIAT), Dassault Aviation (represent by Eric Trappier), Renault Trucks (Volvo Group).

Appointed CEO and chairman in 2001, General (CR) Bernard Norlain embarked on a policy of diversification in response to a gradual erosion of its core business – due, particularly, to the establishment of sales teams within its holding. In 2007, under the leadership of its new chairman and CEO, Guillaume Giscard d'Estaing, Sofema underwent a profound shift in its business.

In effect, the company passed in just a few years from playing a role as intermediary in large French export contracts, to selling renovated land, air and sea equipment. Products include the VBC-90 internal security vehicle, Véhicule de l'Avant Blindé APC, and Aérospatiale Alouette III helicopter, in addition to the AML and Eland series of light armoured cars.

== Sofema operations ==
=== Renovation ===
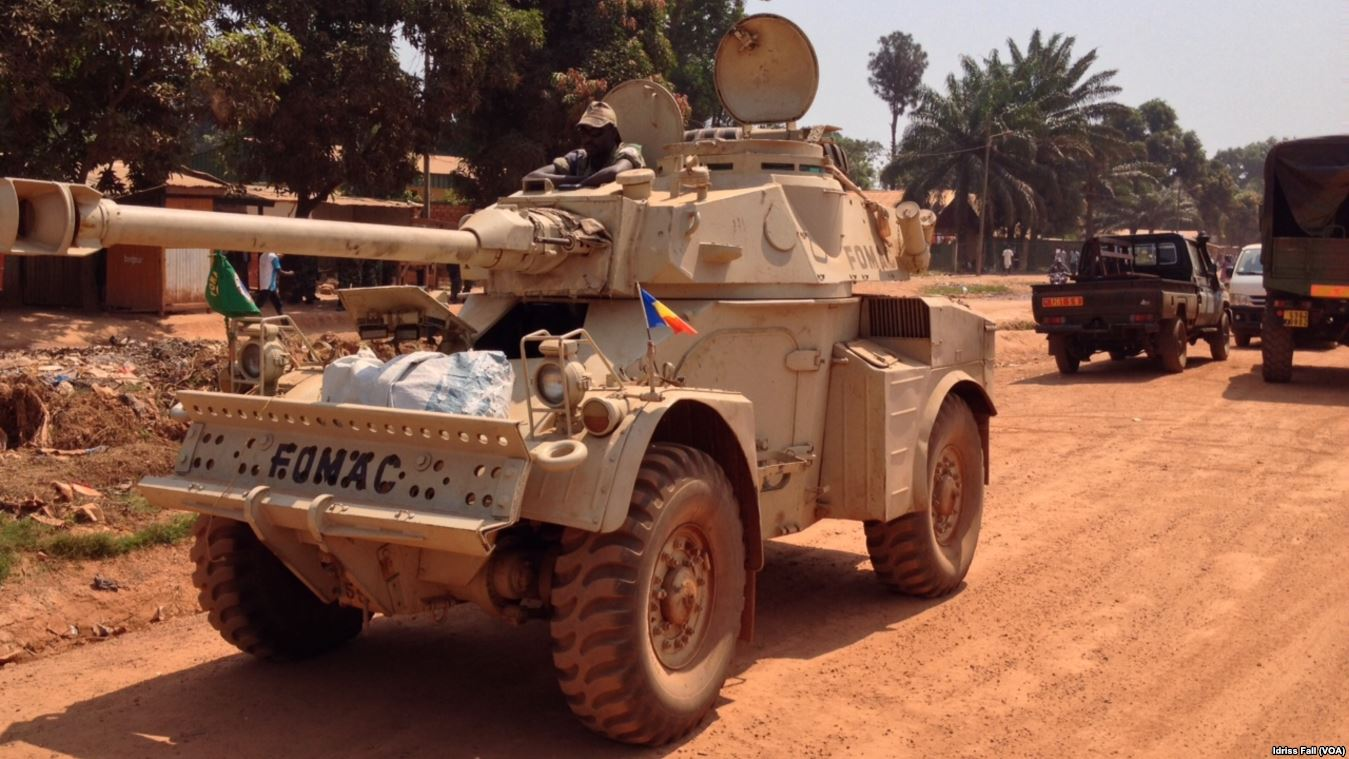
Eland Mk7 armoured car upgraded and delivered by Sofema to Chad.

Depending on the needs of its customers, Sofema acquires first generation equipment, mainly of French origin, and overhauls this to a pristine state in its workshops, or through its specialised partners. Contracts include significant support to implementation and training to buyer-countries, equal to the services provided by major industry in exports of new equipment.

=== Trading ===
Complementary to its renovation activities, Sofema offers spare parts.

=== Advisory ===
Sofema's International Advisory department aims to assist industry groups around the world in their international development. It offers combined audit financing, commercial representation, services across five continents in the areas of defence and security, aerospace, energy, transport infrastructure and the environment.
