= No Fly List (disambiguation) =

The No Fly List is the US federal government list of individuals banned from US commercial flights.

No Fly List may also refer to:

- No Fly List (India), the Indian equivalent
- Passenger Protect, the Canadian equivalent
- Exit Control List, a list of people whom the Government of Pakistan prohibits from leaving Pakistan
