= Guiscard (name) =

Guiscard is a given name and a surname. Notable people with the name include:

- Antoine de Guiscard (1658–1711), French refugee, spy and double
- Robert Guiscard (c. 1015 – 1085), Norman adventurer
- Roger Guiscard (1031–1101), Norman nobleman who became the first Count of Sicily from 1071 to 1101
- Guiscard Bustari, 13th-century Florentine adventurer

== See also ==
- Guiscardo
- Giscard d'Estaing (surname)
