= Intermiles =

Travel and holiday companies of India

InterMiles (Jet Privilege Private Limited)
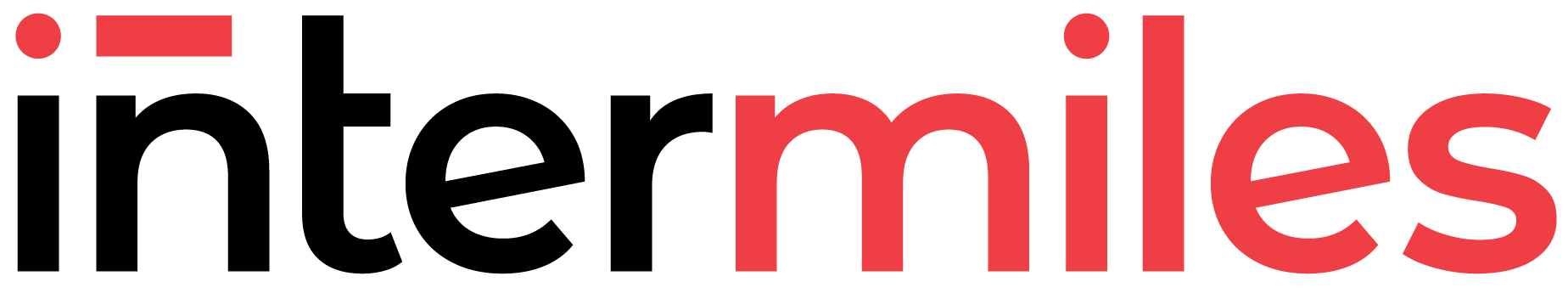
- Company type: Private, subsidiary
- Industry: Technology; Finance
- Founded: 2014; 12 years ago
- Headquarters: Unit No-703, 7th Floor, Kanakia Wall Street, Andheri Kurla Road, 400099 Mumbai, Maharashtra, India
- Key people: Akash Poddar (CEO)
- Products: frequent-flyer program
- Owner: Etihad Airways
- Website: www.intermiles.com

Jet Privilege Private Limited (JPPL) part of the Etihad Aviation Group, is an independent, loyalty and rewards Management Company formed in 2014. It was rebranded as InterMiles in 2019. As of 2020. the program had about 10 million members.

== History ==
In 2012, Jet Privilege Private Limited (JPPL) was formed to issue miles and then let members redeem miles after it is accrued in members account. It was the frequent-flyer program of Jet Airways (Jet Privilege Private Limited, (JPPL)) that ceased operations in April 2019, in which 50.1% stake is held by Etihad Airways, part of the Etihad Aviation Group.

InterMiles (formerly known as JetPrivilege) was founded in 2014 as an independent entity, part of the Etihad Aviation Group formed with the sole purpose to market, develop and grow InterMiles, a loyalty and rewards programme.

== Funding ==
Etihad Airways bought a 50.1% stake in the company for $150 million in 2014. Jet Airways holds a 49.9% stake in the company.

== Advertising campaign ==
After rebranding, InterMiles launched their first television advertisement in 2020.

== See also ==
- Online shopping
