= D'Estaing =

d'Estaing is a French surname. Notable people with the surname include:

- Charles Henri Hector d'Estaing (1729–1794), French general and admiral
- Guillaume-Hugues d'Estaing (died 1455), French Roman Catholic cardinal and bishop
- Anne-Aymone Giscard d'Estaing (born 1933), former First Lady of France
- Guillaume Giscard d'Estaing (born 1958), French businessman
- Henri Giscard d'Estaing (born 1956), French businessman
- Louis Giscard d'Estaing (born 1958), French politician
- Olivier Giscard d'Estaing (1927–2021), French politician
- Valéry Giscard d'Estaing (1926–2020), President of France (1974–1981)

== See also ==
- d'Estaing family
- Estaing (disambiguation)
