= Guiscardo =

Guiscardo is a given name and a surname. Notable people with the name include:

== Given name ==
- Guiscardo Améndola (1906–1972), Uruguayan painter
- Guiscardo Suardi (died 1282), Roman Catholic prelate
- Teofilo Guiscardo Rossi di Montelera (1902–1991), Italian bobsledder

== Surname ==
- Liliana Guiscardo (born 1981), Argentine swimmer

== Fictional characters ==
Guiscardo, a character in the novella "The Tale of Ghismonda and Guiscardo" from The Decameron, see Sigismunda Mourning over the Heart of Guiscardo, painting

== See also ==
- Guiscard
- Giscard
