= Estaing =

Estaing may refer to:

- Estaing, Aveyron, France
- Estaing, Hautes-Pyrénées, France

== See also ==
- d'Estaing (disambiguation)
