= No Fly List (India) =

List of passengers barred from Indian flights

The National No Fly List is an Indian government initiative to identify disruptive passengers and temporarily prohibit them from boarding flights. The objective of the list is "to ensure safety and check unruly and disruptive behaviour on aircraft". The no-fly list is compiled and maintained by the Directorate General of Civil Aviation (DGCA) based on inputs from airlines. The no-fly list only governs passenger behaviour onboard scheduled and non-scheduled flights. Offences committed within the airport premises fall under the jurisdiction of the relevant security agency in charge of that airport.

Passengers who engage in unruly physical gestures, verbal harassment, unruly inebriation, physically abusive behaviour, or any life-threatening action on board an aircraft can be placed on the list. A passenger on the list is prohibited from flying on any aircraft operated by the airline that placed them on the list for the duration of their ban. Other airlines may choose to deny service to the passenger but are not compelled to do so. The full list of individuals placed on the no fly list is displayed on the DGCA website.

The list was adopted after Shiv Sena leader Ravindra Gaikwad was accused of thrashing Air India staff with his shoe, when they tried to make him disembark the plane on 23 March 2017. He was accused of unruly behaviour after being denied a business class seat on a flight from Delhi to Pune because the flight was all economy. Gaikwad was subsequently banned by several airlines when he tried to book a flight through them using various identities, but was unsuccessful.

The Ministry of Civil Aviation unveiled draft plans for a national no-fly list in May 2017. The Ministry officially created the no-fly list on 8 September 2017 and notified rules concerning the list. The DGCA revised relevant sections of the Civil Aviation Requirement (CAR Section 3, Series M, Part Vl on "Handling of Unruly Passengers") in accordance with the provisions of the 1963 Tokyo Convention.

== Offences ==
Offences are categorised into three levels punishable by lengthier bans. Inappropriate physical gestures, verbal harassment and unruly inebriation are Level 1 offences and are punishable with ban of up to 3 months. Physically abusive behaviour, including inappropriate touching, are Level 2 offences punishable by ban of up to 6 months. Any action that threatens the life of a passenger or attempts to damage to aircraft systems is a Level 3 offence and is punishable with a mandatory minimum ban of at least 2 years.

The Ministry has not clarified whether a Level 3 offence can result in a life ban.

== Procedure ==
The procedure to place a passenger on the list must be initiated by the pilot in command of the flight who makes a report to the airline. The airline must form an internal committee to study the case and decide on punishment. The committee must be headed by a retired District or Sessions judge, and the remaining members come from various scheduled airline and passenger associations, consumer associations and retired officials of the Consumer Dispute Redressal Forum. The committee must make its decision within 30 days. During the 30 day period, the passenger is prohibited from boarding flights operated by the airline that filed the report. If the committee does not make a decision within 30 days, the case against the passenger is automatically dropped.

A passenger on the list is prohibited from flying on any aircraft operated by the airline that placed them on the list for the duration of their ban. Other airlines may choose to deny service to the passenger but are not compelled to do so. A banned passenger has the right to appeal their ban within 60 days of committee decision. Appeals are reviewed by a panel set up by the Ministry of Civil Aviation. If the panel upholds the decision, the passenger may seek further redress through the High Court.

In November 2017, Birju Kishore Salla, a jeweller from Mumbai, became the first passenger to be placed on the no-fly list. While flying on Jet Airways Flight 339 from Mumbai to Delhi on 30 October 2017, Salla left a note in the business class lavatory claiming that 12 hijackers were on board the flight and that explosives had been placed in the cargo area. The discovery of the note caused a hijack scare resulting in the flight being diverted for an emergency landing in Ahmedabad. Bomb disposal units inspected the aircraft and determined that there were no explosives and the note was a hoax. Jet Airways subsequently charged Salla with "breach of security", a Level 3 offence, and banned him for 5 years. Salla was also arrested by Mumbai Police and charged under the Anti-Hijacking Act. Coincidentally, Salla is also the first person to be charged under the new act which came into force in July 2017 and replaced the previous 1982 Act. Salla confessed to leaving the note and explained that he hoped it would cause Jet Airways to shut down its operations in Delhi. Salla's girlfriend is employed at the airline's Delhi office, and he hoped the closure would make her return to Mumbai.
