= Jet Airways =

Airline of India (1992–2019)

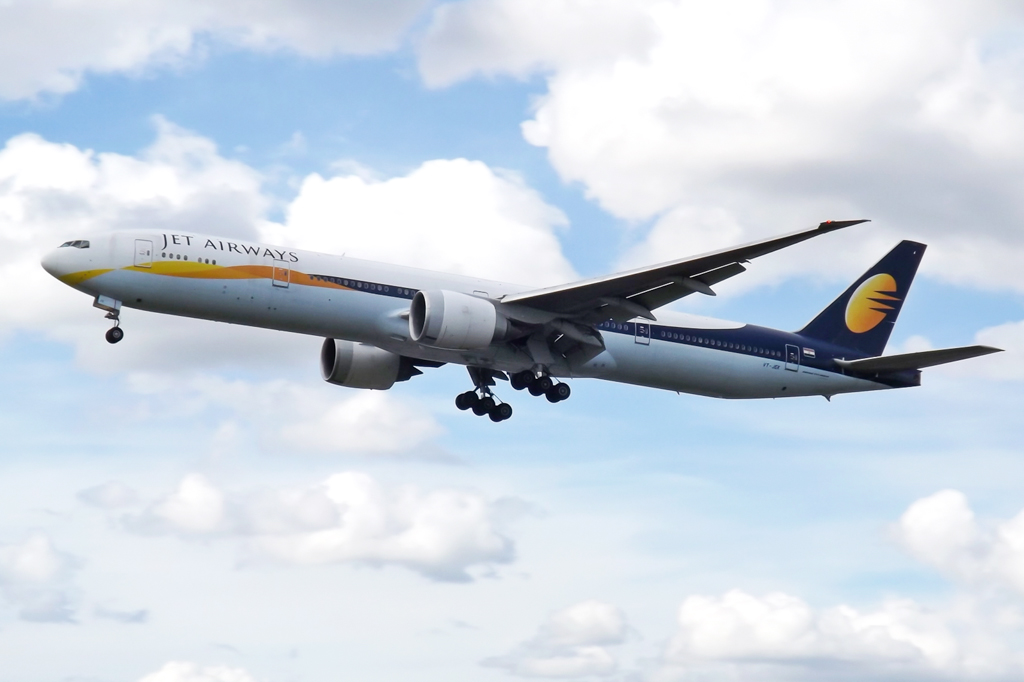
- Jet Airways Boeing 777-300ER in 2014
IATA	ICAO	Call sign
9W	JAI	JET AIRWAYS
- Founded: 1 April 1993; 33 years ago
- Commenced operations: 5 May 1993; 33 years ago
- Ceased operations: 17 April 2019; 7 years ago
- Hubs: Mumbai
- Secondary hubs: Bengaluru; Chennai; Delhi; Kochi; Kolkata
- Focus cities: Amsterdam
- Frequent-flyer program: Intermiles
- Subsidiaries: JetKonnect (2012–2019); JetLite (2007–2012)
- Fleet size: 5
- Traded as: BSE: 532617; NSE: JETTAIRWAYS
- ISIN: INE802G01018
- Headquarters: Mumbai, Maharashtra, India
- Key people: Murari Lal Jalan (non-executive chairman)
- Revenue: ▲₹252 billion (US$2.6 billion) (FY 2017–18)
- Profit: ▼₹−6.3 billion (US$−65 million) (FY 2017–18)
- Employees: 16,015 (2017)
- Website: www.jetairways.com

Jet Airways Limited, trading as Jet Airways, was an Indian full-service airline based in Delhi, with a training and developmental centre in Mumbai. Incorporated in April 1993 as a limited liability company, the airline began operations as an air taxi operator in 1993. It began full operations in 1995, with international flights introduced in 2004. The airline went public in 2005 and in 2007, when it acquired Air Sahara. The airline was expected to re-commence its flight operations by the end of 2024, which would have made it the first Indian airline to be revived after ceasing operations. However, on 7 November 2024, the liquidation of the airline was ordered by the Supreme Court of India.

It grew to be one of the largest airlines in India, with a 21.2% passenger market share in February 2016. Jet Airways operated over 300 flights daily to 74 destinations worldwide from its former main hub at Chhatrapati Shivaji Maharaj International Airport in Mumbai and secondary hubs at Chennai International Airport in Chennai, Indira Gandhi International Airport in New Delhi, Kempegowda International Airport in Bangalore, Cochin International Airport in Kochi and Netaji Subhas Chandra Bose International Airport in Kolkata.

With its competitors—primarily low-cost carriers SpiceJet and IndiGo—lowering ticket fares in the following years, it was forced to follow suit, hurting overall performance resulting in steep financial losses. It dropped to second place behind IndiGo in October 2017, with a passenger market share of 17.8%. The downward slide continued and resulted in bankruptcy in 2019. Jet Airways ceased operations on 17 April 2019.

In 2020, Jet Airways was acquired by the investment company Kalrock with plans to resume operations in 2022. However, these plans were delayed due to financial issues and ongoing proceedings with the National Company Law Tribunal. The airline was expected to restart operations by end of 2024, with Jalan-Kalrock's ownership retained.

After years of prolonged attempts at resuscitation, the Supreme Court ordered the liquidation of the airline on 7 November 2024.

== History ==
The airline was granted a scheduled airline status on 14 January 1995. It entered into a marketing agreement with KLM the same year. In 1996, the airline placed a $375 million order for four 737-400 and six 737-800 aircraft from Boeing, which were delivered between 1997 and 2000. Jet Airways was the first airline in Southeast Asia to order the 737-800. In the financial year 1996–97, the airline carried 2.4 million passengers and had a market share of 20 percent, second highest after state-owned Indian Airlines. By this time, the airline had a fleet of twelve Boeing 737 aircraft, operating 83 daily flights to 23 domestic destinations. In 1997, the Cabinet Committee on Foreign Investment (CCFI) of the Government of India announced that foreign airlines would no longer be permitted to take an equity stake in joint ventures with Indian aviation companies, reversing the Government's earlier policy which had allowed carriers such as Gulf Air, Kuwait Airways and Lufthansa to hold a maximum 40% equity stake in their joint ventures with Indian partners. In October 1997, as per this directive, Naresh Goyal took back control of Trade Winds from its foreign investors.

At the Paris Air Show in June 1999, Jet Airways announced an order worth approximately $550 million for ten Boeing 737-800 aircraft. The airline purchased its first Boeing 737-400 simulator from CAE Inc. in 2001. By April 2001, the airline fleet had grown to 30 aircraft and was operating over 195 flights daily to 37 destinations within India. Jet Airways suffered losses for the first time since its establishment in financial year 2001–2002 as demand fell and costs increased. It was announced as the launch customer for the Embraer 175 at the Farnborough air show in 2002, with an order for ten aircraft and ten options worth $520 million; unfortunately, the deal was subsequently held in abeyance due to the airline's financial difficulties and eventually fell through. In 2003, the Indian government decided to allow private carriers to operate international services to countries in South Asia, such as Bangladesh, Nepal, and Sri Lanka, and Jet Airways began preparations to launch international services. The airline launched its first international flight in March 2004 from Chennai to Colombo.

Jet Airways was listed on the Bombay Stock Exchange and became a public company on 28 December 2004. After the Government of India lifted the foreign ownership limits on Indian airlines to 49% from the previous 40%, the airline moved to raise funds via an IPO. The company's IPO in February 2005—which offered 20% of the airline's stock—saw strong interest from investors leading to oversubscription in retail, non-institutional and institutional tranches and raised ₹18.9 billion, instantly making Naresh Goyal a paper billionaire. Towards the end of 2004, the government announced that privately owned scheduled carriers meeting certain criteria could operate to all countries apart from those in the Middle East. Thereafter, in January 2005, the Ministry of Civil Aviation granted rights to Jet Airways to operate services to London Heathrow. The airline started its first international, long-haul flight to London in May 2005 with two-class Airbus A340-300s sub-leased from South African Airways.

=== Growth and expansion ===
In January 2006, Jet Airways announced its intention to acquire Air Sahara for US$500 million in an all-cash deal; however, the deal fell through in June 2006. On 12 April 2007, the deal was back on track with Jet Airways agreeing to pay ₹14.5 billion (US$150 million). On 16 April 2007, Air Sahara was renamed as JetLite and was marketed between a low-cost carrier and a full-service airline. JetLite became a wholly-owned subsidiary of Jet Airways. In August 2008, Jet Airways announced its plans to integrate JetLite into Jet Airways. In October 2008, Jet Airways laid off 1,900 of its employees, who were later reinstated after the Ministry of Civil Aviation's intervention. In October 2008, the airline entered into an alliance with rival Kingfisher Airlines for code-sharing on domestic and international flights, collaboration on frequent-flyer program, and sharing crew and ground handling equipment. On 8 May 2009, Jet Airways launched another low-cost brand, Jet Konnect. It operated a fleet of Boeing 737 Next Generation and ATR 72 aircraft and operated on profitable short-haul routes with higher passenger load factors.

=== Consolidation ===
In the third quarter of 2010, Jet Airways became the largest airline in India with a passenger market share of 22.6%. In July 2012, the airline officially sought government approval to join Star Alliance. Jet Airways is not a member of Star Alliance as of 2019 In June 2011, it became the first domestic airline in India to ban meat products and liquids from check-in baggage. Jet Airways merged the JetLite brand into Jet Konnect on 25 March 2012 and began offering business-class seats after the demise of Kingfisher Airlines. In 2013, Etihad Airways planned to buy a stake in the airline following the government's announcement in September 2012 that foreign airlines could take a stake of up to 49% in Indian carriers. On 24 April 2013, Jet announced that it was ready to sell a 24% stake in the airline to Etihad for US$379 million. The deal, which was expected to be signed in January 2013, was deferred, and was eventually inked on 12 November 2013. Naresh Goyal retained 51% ownership of the stock. In 2013, the airline lowered prices and entered into a fare war with low-cost carriers IndiGo and SpiceJet due to falling passenger demand. In February 2013, the airline's market value dropped by ₹4.84 billion (US$50 million) due to falling share prices. Jet Airways made profits in the third quarter of the financial year 2013–14, after posting losses over the previous year. The airline announced on 11 August 2014 that it would phase out Jet Konnect by the end of the year as part of plans to reposition itself as a uniform full-service operator. On 1 December 2014, Jet Konnect was fully merged with Jet Airways, making it the third full-service airline in India besides Air India and Vistara. In December 2015, Jet Airways announced the closure of its scissor hub at Brussels Airport by March 2016 and the inauguration of a new hub at Amsterdam Schiphol Airport, effective 27 March 2016. As of February 2016, it was the second-largest airline in India after IndiGo, with a 21.2% passenger-market share.

=== Bankruptcy and cessation of services ===
As of November 2018, Jet Airways was reported to have a negative financial outlook due to increasing losses. In March 2019, it was reported that nearly a fourth of Jet Airways' aircraft inventory was grounded due to unpaid lease rates. On 25 March 2019, Mr. Naresh Goyal and his wife Anitha Goyal stepped down from the board of directors.

On 5 April 2019, Indian Oil Corporation stopped supplying fuel to Jet Airways, citing non-payment of dues as the emergency funds have still not been credited. On 17 April 2019, Jet Airways suspended all flight operations after lenders spurned a ₹4 billion emergency funding request, and its membership in the International Air Transport Association (IATA) was suspended too. On 17 June 2019, after receiving no acceptable offers from Etihad Airways and Hinduja Group, lenders of Jet Airways decided to refer the company to National Company Law Tribunal (NCLT) for bankruptcy proceedings with debt amounting to $1.2 billion.

As the group faced insolvency proceedings in the Netherlands after failing to pay two creditors, the NCLAT allowed cross-border insolvency proceedings, stating that the "Dutch Trustee (Administrator) would work in cooperation with the 'Resolution Professional of India.'"

In early 2020, the Enso Group attempted to rescue the airline with the Russian Far East Development Fund and participated in talks to buy a controlling stake from its committee of creditors (CoC), but the talks fell through.

=== Restart ===
In 2020, entrepreneur Murari Lal Jalan and asset management firm Kalrock, part of the Fritsch Group, purchased Jet Airways with a view to restart air operations. It was expected that Jet Airways II would take to the skies in 2022 as a full-service domestic airline with a fleet of six aircraft. On 20 May 2022, Jet Airways received its air operator's certificate. However, flights did not resume in 2022, and the company did not renew its air operator's certificate in 2023, leading to speculations that the resuscitation stalled.

In August 2023, it was reported that Jet Airways has lost its IATA code, 9W, after all flights were grounded for over four years. A Jet Airways spokesperson stated that the IATA code is "currently under preservation with IATA," until operations are recommenced. As of September 2023, Jet Airways was expected to restart operations by the end of 2024, with Jalan-Kalrock's ownership retained.

=== Liquidation ===
The Supreme Court ordered the liquidation of the airline—officially Jet Airways (India) Ltd.—on 7 November 2024. The SC overturned the decision of the National Company Law Appellate Tribunal to transfer Jet Airways to the Jalan-Kalrock Consortium (JKC) and upheld the State Bank of India-led team of creditors' appeal that "the consortium had failed to meet the initial financial commitments required in the resolution plan."

The main institutional shareholders included Punjab National Bank (26%), Etihad Airways (24%), and Jet's original promoters (25%), according to the analysis. At the current market valuation of ₹386.69 crore (equivalent to ₹412 crore or US$43 million in 2026), retail shares in the airline amount to roughly ₹74.6 crore (equivalent to ₹79 crore or US$8.3 million in 2026). The airline started proceedings with the sale of three B777s and six engines to Access aviation, a Malta-based creditor of the airline.

== Livery ==
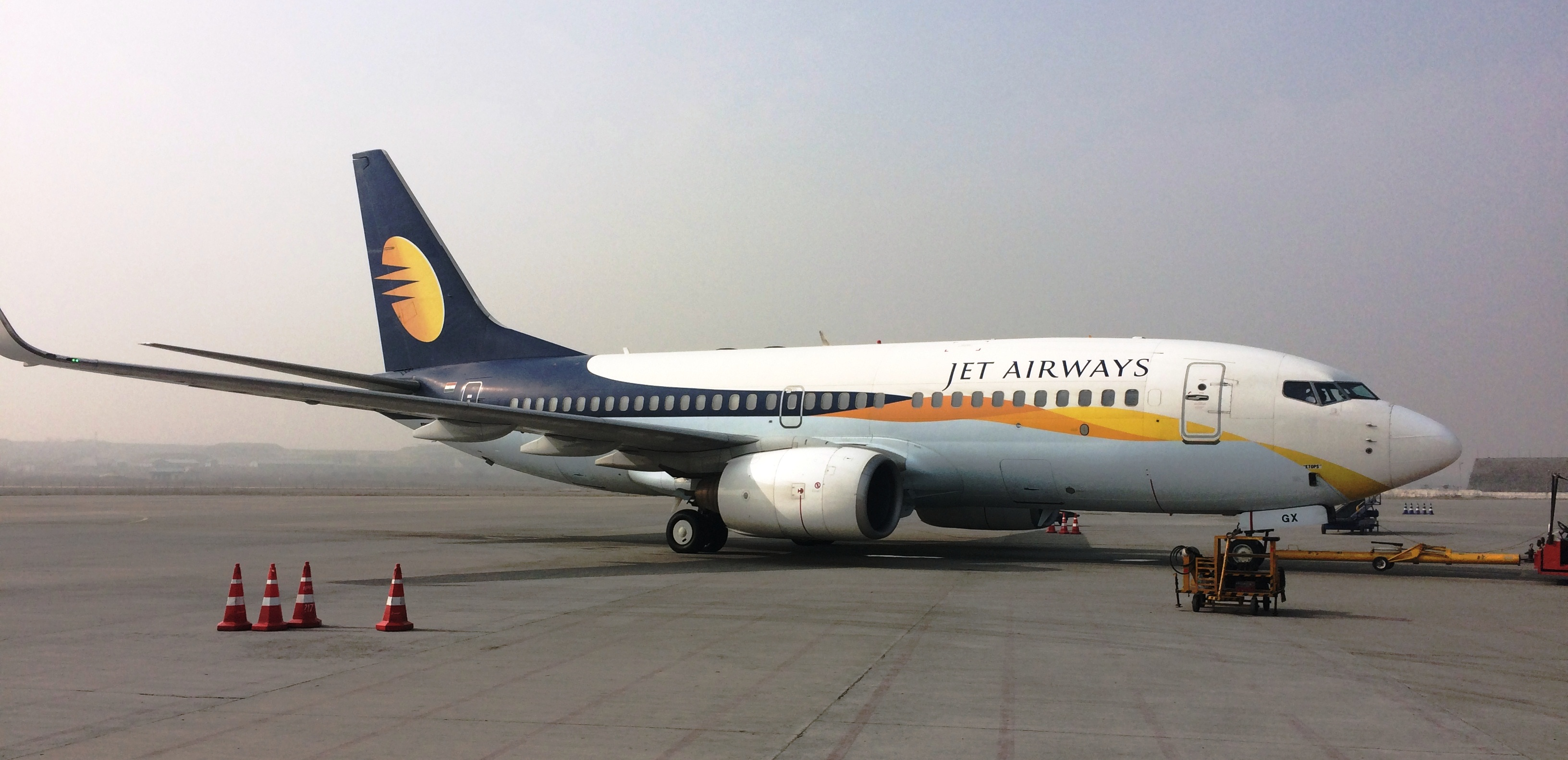
A Jet Airways Boeing 737 with the new livery at Srinagar Airport

The original livery was navy blue with light grey and chrome yellow. The top and bottom of the aircraft were painted light grey, with the flying sun logo on a navy blue background.

In 2007, a new livery designed by Landor Associates was introduced, featuring yellow and gold ribbons. The design retained the dark blue and gold-accented colour scheme along with the airline's "flying sun" logo. A new yellow uniform was concurrently introduced, created by Italian designer Roberto Capucci. Jet Airways introduced its new identity in conjunction with a global brand re-launch that included new aircraft and refreshed seating arrangement.

== Controversies ==
=== Safety ===
Asmin Tariq, a contractor working for the airline as a security agent at Heathrow airport, was implicated in the foiled terror plot on 10 August 2006 to blow up several transatlantic airliners belonging to three different US airlines. Subsequently, the Governments of UK and Singapore sought security-related information from the Ministry of External Affairs of India on Jet Airways; clearance was further delayed to fly to the US. The US State Department gave the go-ahead for the airline to fly to the US on 15 November 2006.

In August 2014, two pilots of Jet Airways were suspended after a plane carrying 280 passengers dropped 5,000 feet (1,500 m) mid-air en route from Mumbai to Brussels.

=== Customer care ===
On 2 December 2016, Jet Airways flight 9W7083 from Bhopal to Mumbai was held up by a large group of passengers headed for a wedding in Mumbai. There were allegations from other passengers that the wedding party was politically connected and attempted to coerce the cabin crew to disembark passengers so that additional members of their party could be accommodated. The airline, however, claimed it was a technical glitch in their booking system which led to overbooking.

=== Corruption ===
In 2016, Jet Airways was implicated in the Gupta family controversy in South Africa. Former African National Congress MP Vytjie Mentor alleged that members of the Gupta family had offered her the position of Minister of Public Enterprises on behalf of President Jacob Zuma, in exchange for her facilitating the cancellation of South African Airways' India route so Jet Airways could take it over.

=== Links to organised crime ===
On 12 December 2001, an internal memo from two Indian intelligence agencies—R&AW and IB—to the Home Ministry of India stated they had evidence that Jet Airways held intermittent contact with Dawood Ibrahim, Chota Shakeel, and other gangs of Indian organised crime, related to financial transactions. This information was leaked to the media and parliament proceedings were stalled. Subsequently, in 2016, reports emerged that the initial investment for Jet Airways had come through shell companies based in the Isle of Man and was heavily funded by prominent figures in Indian organised crime. This was documented in detail in the book A Feast of Vultures.

== Destinations ==
According to its website, in 2016, Jet Airways served 57 destinations—37 domestic and 20 international—across 15 countries in Asia, Europe, North America, and the Middle East. The airline had its primary hub in Mumbai and secondary bases in Delhi and Bangalore.

The airline's first international destination, introduced in March 2004, was Colombo, served from Chennai. Launched in 2005, London was the airline's first long-haul destination. Since 2007, Jet Airways has had a scissors hub at Brussels Airport for onward transatlantic connections to North America, which was replaced by Amsterdam Airport Schiphol from 27 March 2016.

In 2008, the airline was forced to discontinue international routes due to losses sustained by the 2008 financial crisis and the Great Recession; it terminated services to San Francisco and Shanghai. The airline planned to restore the Mumbai–Shanghai route by the end of 2011, but it never materialised. In 2012, the airline withdrew flights to New York City and closed the Delhi–Milan route in 2013. On 1 March 2016, the airline announced the integration of domestic and international operations at Mumbai airport and moved its entire operations to the newly constructed Terminal 2.

=== Codeshare agreements ===
Jet Airways had codeshare agreements with the following airlines before ceasing their operations:

- Aeroméxico
- Air Canada
- Air France
- Air Seychelles
- All Nippon Airways
- Bangkok Airways
- China Eastern Airlines
- Delta Air Lines
- Etihad Airways
- Fiji Airways
- Garuda Indonesia
- Hong Kong Airlines
- Jetstar Asia
- Kenya Airways
- KLM
- Korean Air
- Malaysia Airlines
- Qantas
- Vietnam Airlines
- Virgin Atlantic

== Fleet ==
=== Current fleet ===
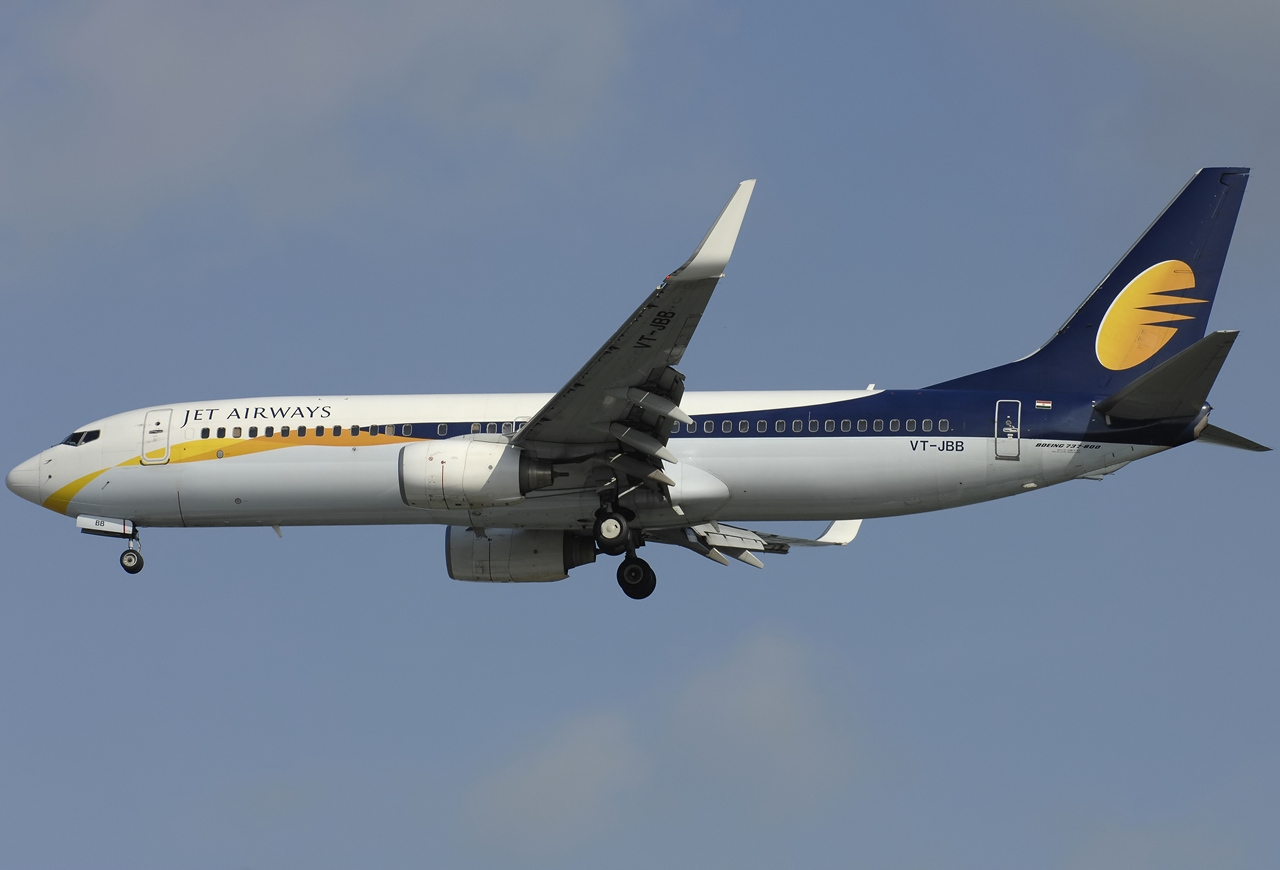
A Jet Airways Boeing 737-800 on approach to Singapore Changi Airport in 2010

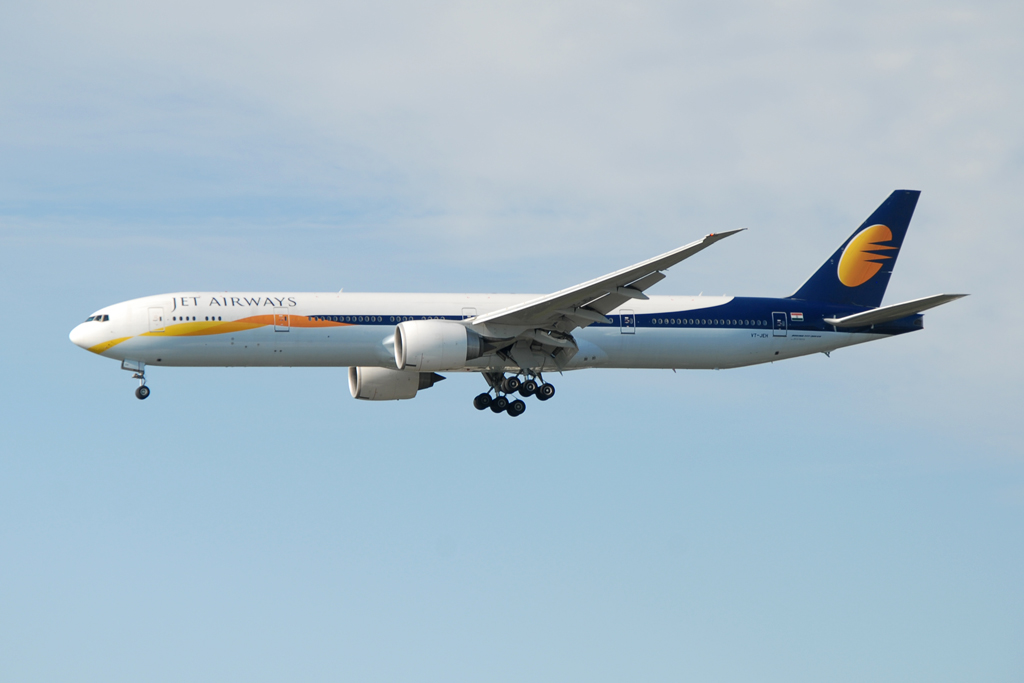
A Jet Airways Boeing 777-300ER on approach to London Heathrow Airport in 2012

After the airline was grounded owing to financial constraints, the current Jet Airways fleet consists of the following as of 2024:

Jet Airways Fleet (as of September 2022)
Aircraft	Total	Passengers				Notes
Aircraft	Total	F	J	Y	Total	Notes
Boeing 737-800	2	–	12	156	168	
Boeing 737-900	1	–	28	138	166	
Boeing 777-300ER	2	8	30	308	346	
Total	5					

=== Fleet development ===
Jet Airways placed its first order for four Boeing 737-400 and 30 Boeing 737-800 aircraft on 11 December 1996: the first aircraft was delivered on 12 November 1997. It placed its second order comprising six Boeing 737-700 and two Boeing 737-900 aircraft on 14 June 1999, with deliveries starting in May 2001. The airline launched its next round of fleet expansion in 2005 when it ordered 30 aircraft at the Paris Air Show. The airline signed deals with Airbus for ten A330 aircraft and with Boeing for ten 737 and 777 aircraft each. Long-haul routes were served using its fleet of Airbus A330-200, Airbus A330-300 and Boeing 777-300ER. The airline placed an order for 10 Boeing 777-300ER aircraft on 29 September 2005, which were delivered in 2007. Jet Airways ordered 10 Boeing 787 Dreamliners on 29 December 2006 to operate on long-haul routes. On 5 January 2012, it inducted five ATR 72-600 series to operate on domestic regional routes. It further placed an order for 75 Boeing 737 MAX aircraft on 23 April 2013 as part of modernisation of its fleet of 737s. In April 2018 and July 2018, the airline entered into an agreement to acquire an additional 75 Boeing 737 MAX aircraft, taking its order tally to 225 Boeing 737 MAX jets. After Jet Airways ceased operations, Boeing cancelled all of Jet Airways' remaining 737 MAX 8 orders, as well as the Boeing 737 MAX 9 and 10 orders, and Boeing 787-9 orders, due to the airline's financial problems and eventual collapse. As a part of the airline's relaunch, reports emerged that the airline was in talks with Airbus to procure 50 narrow body Airbus A220 aircraft. Some news reports indicated that Jalan-Kalrock was in talks with aircraft OEMs (original equipment manufacturers) to place an order for at least 200 aircraft—a mix of small, medium, and large narrow-body jets—at the Paris Airshow in June 2023 as part of their five-year growth plan. However, this never materialised.

=== Former fleet ===
Jet Airways operated the following aircraft in the past:

Jet Airways former fleet
Aircraft	Total	Introduced	Retired	Notes
Airbus A320-200	1	1996	1996	Leased from Gulf Air
Airbus A330-200	12	2006	2019	
Airbus A330-300	4	2012	2019	
Airbus A340-300	3	2005	2007	Leased from South African Airways
ATR 72-500	23	1999	2019	
ATR 72-600	3	2012	2019	
Boeing 737-300	4	1993	1999	
Boeing 737-400	16	1994	2009	
Boeing 737-500	5	1998	2001	
Boeing 737-700	25	1998	2019	
Boeing 737-900ER	4	2012	2019	
Boeing 737 MAX 8	8	2018	2019	

== Services ==
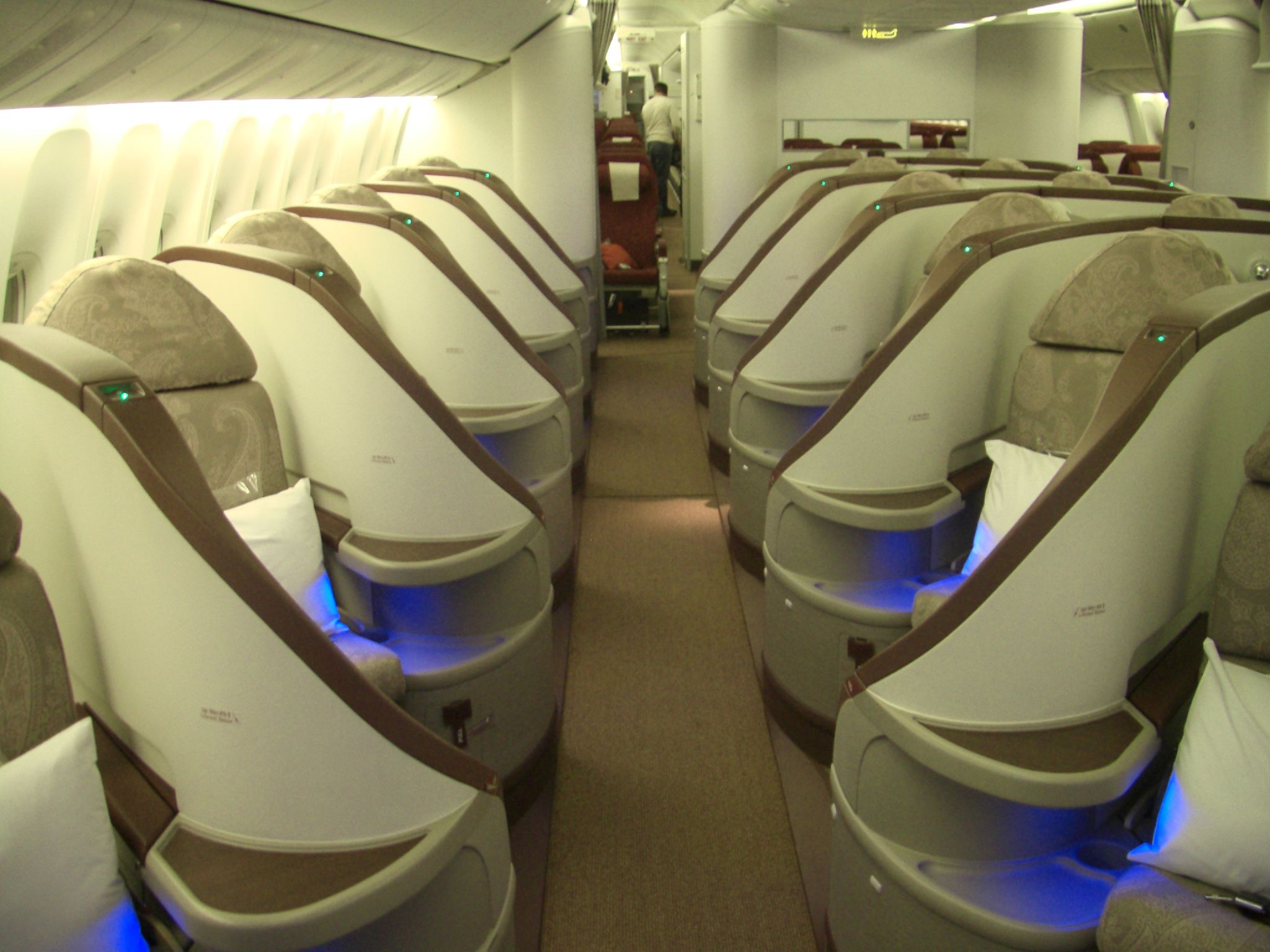
Première Class on board the Boeing 777-300ER

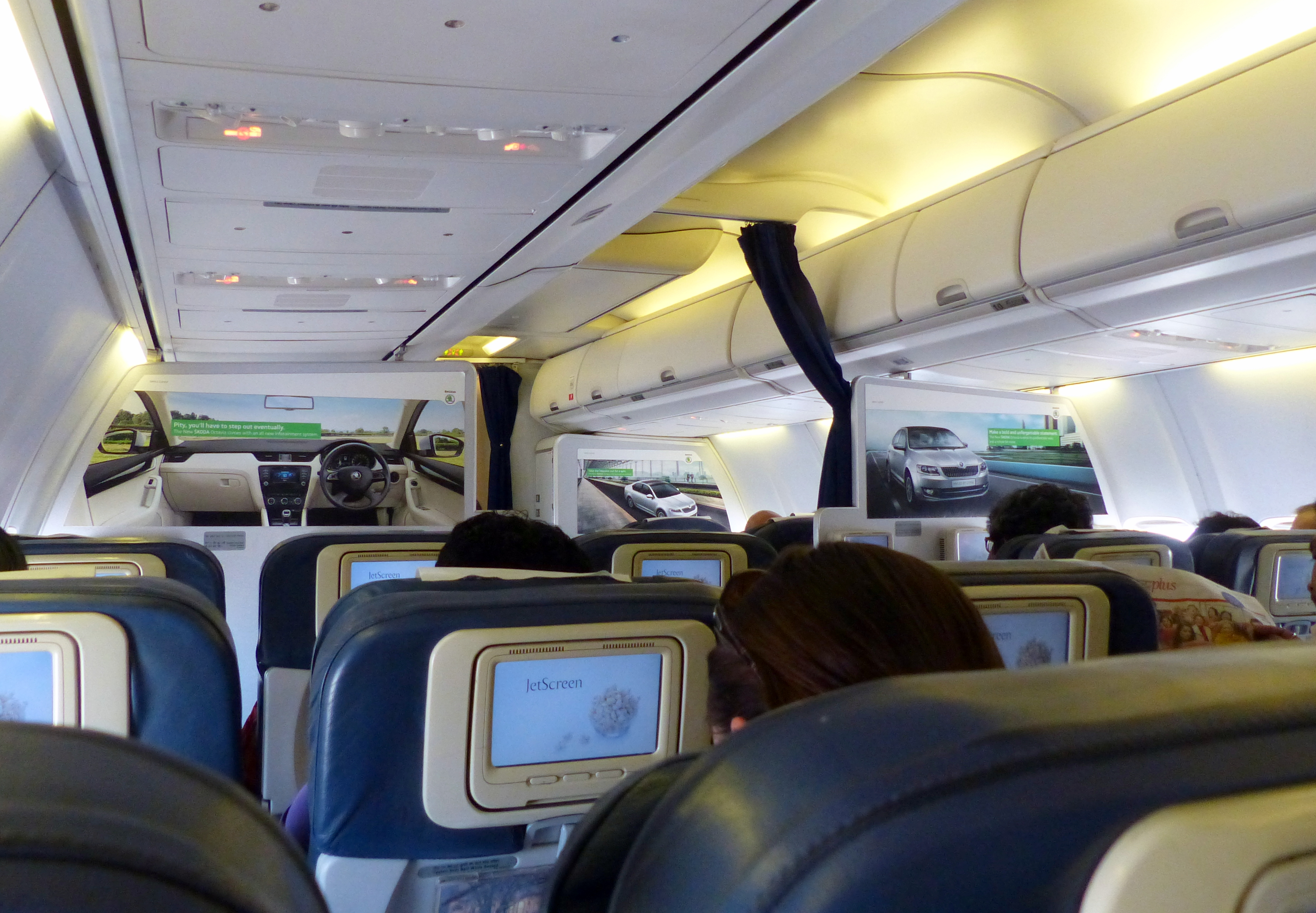
Interior of a Jet Airways Boeing 737

=== Cabin ===
Jet Airways had three classes of service: First, Première (Business) and Economy.

- First class was available only on the Boeing 777-300ER aircraft. The first class offered private suites, featuring seats that could convert into fully flat beds, personal LCD TVs, and in-seat power supply.
- Première class was available on long-haul international flights aboard Airbus A330-200 and Boeing 777-300ER aircraft, featuring recliner seats, fully flat beds with personal LCD TVs, and in-seat power. Première class on domestic flights offered recliner seats with larger leg room in a 2-2 configuration.
- Economy class on long-haul aircraft had a 32 inches (810 mm) seat pitch with a footrest. The cabin was configured in 2-4-2 layout on the Airbus A330-200 and 3-4-3 layout on the Boeing 777-300ER. Economy seats on both the Airbus A330 and Boeing 777 sported a personal 10.6 inches (270 mm) touchscreen LCD TV. Domestic flights operated by Boeing 737 aircraft had both Première and Economy classes, while the ATR 72 aircraft had an all-economy class configuration. Economy class on Boeing 737 featured a 30 inches (760 mm) seat pitch with a personal LCD behind each seat. Meals were served in economy class until recently, when the airline introduced a buy-on-board service called Jet Bistro.

=== Wi-Fi ===
On 1 February 2016, Jet Airways announced the introduction of an in-flight entertainment service for streaming of entertainment content directly to Wi-Fi enabled personal devices of the passengers.

=== Frequent Flyer Program ===
Jet Airways's frequent-flyer programme was called Jet Privilege. It was rebranded as Intermiles in 2019.

== Accidents and incidents ==
- 1 July 2007: Jet Airways Flight 3307, an ATR 72-212A (registered VT-JCE)—operating on the Bhopal-Indore route—was involved in an accident caused by bad weather. While there were no fatalities amongst the 45 passengers and four crew members, the aircraft was damaged beyond repair and written off.
- 18 August 2015: Jet Airways Flight 555, a Boeing 737-800 (registered VT-JFA)—flying on the Doha-Cochin route—was involved in a serious incident at Trivandrum Airport after diverting due to poor visibility and low fuel. The flight made 3 go-arounds when approaching Cochin Airport and 3 more at Trivandrum. Visual approaches at Trivandrum were conducted in below-minima conditions. A fuel emergency was declared after the 4th go-around when the remaining fuel dropped below the final reserve fuel of 1128 kg. The aircraft landed on runway 32 on the 7th attempt with 349 kg of fuel remaining on board. There were no injuries to the 150 passengers and crew, and the aircraft sustained no damage.
- 27 December 2016: Jet Airways Flight 2374, a Boeing 737-800 (registered VT-JBG)—flying from Goa to Mumbai with 154 passengers and 7 crew—backtracked runway 26, lined up on the runway, and began accelerating the engines for takeoff. However, the aircraft continued to turn right. The crew rejected takeoff, but the aircraft veered off the right edge of the runway, almost perpendicular to it. The aircraft went over soft ground, crossed a road, and came to a stop with the nose gear collapsed and both engines making ground contact. The aircraft was evacuated, and 16 occupants sustained minor injuries during the evacuation.
- 30 October 2017: Jet Airways Flight 339, a Boeing 737-900 flying from Mumbai to Delhi, was subject of a bomb hoax/hijacking hoax. Birju Kishore Salla, a jeweller from Mumbai, left a note in the business class lavatory claiming that 12 hijackers were aboard and that explosives had been placed in the cargo area, demanding that the plane be diverted to Pakistani-administered Kashmir. After the note was found, the plane was diverted for an emergency landing in Ahmedabad, whereupon bomb disposal units searched the aircraft and found that the note was a hoax. Salla was subsequently banned from flying on Jet Airways flights for five years, and became the first person to get added to the Indian No-Fly List.

== See also ==
- List of airlines of India
- Transport in India
