= JetLite =

Indian airline

JetLite (JetKonnect)
IATA	ICAO	Call sign
S2	JLL	LITE JET
- Founded: 20 September 1991; 35 years ago (as Sahara India Airlines)
- Commenced operations: 3 December 1993; 32 years ago
- Ceased operations: 17 April 2019; 7 years ago
- Operating bases: Indira Gandhi International Airport (Delhi)
- Frequent-flyer program: Jet Privilege
- Destinations: 22 {(February 2017)
- Parent company: Tailwinds Limited
- Headquarters: Mumbai, India
- Key people: Naresh Goyal (Owner)
- Website: www.jetairways.com

JetLite was a low-cost subsidiary of Jet Airways. It was formerly known as Air Sahara until the buyout by Jet Airways which rebranded the airline as JetLite. On 17 April 2019, JetLite grounded all of its flights and ceased all operations, in tandem with its parent company, Jet Airways.

== History ==
=== Foundation ===
Former Air Sahara Logo

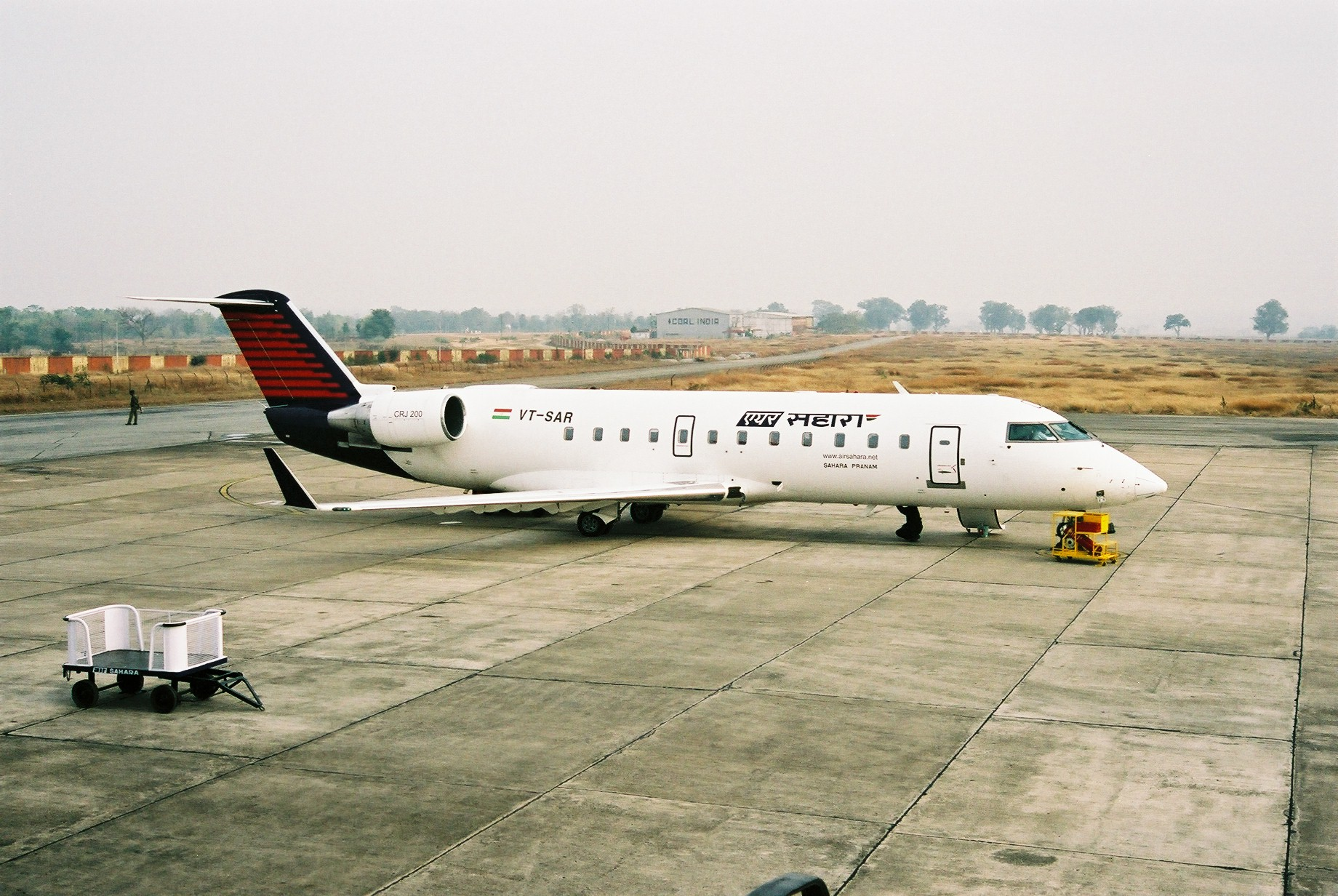
A Bombardier CRJ200 aircraft in Air Sahara livery at Ranchi Airport c.2005

The airline was established on 20 September 1991 and began operations on 3 December 1993 with two Boeing 737–200 aircraft as Sahara India Airlines, as part of the major Sahara India Pariwar business conglomerate. Initially, services were primarily concentrated in the northern sectors of India, keeping Delhi as its base, and then operations were extended to cover all the country. Sahara India Airlines was rebranded as Air Sahara on 2 October 2000, although Sahara India Airlines remains the carrier's registered name. On 22 March 2004 it became an international carrier with the start of flights from Chennai to Colombo, later expanding to London, Singapore, Maldives and Kathmandu. It had also planned to become the first private Indian carrier to serve China with flights to Guangzhou from winter 2006, however, this did not materialize. The uncertainty over the airline's fate caused its share of the domestic Indian air transport market to go down from approximately 11% in January 2006 to a reported 8.5% in April 2007.

=== Buyout by Jet Airways ===
Jet Airways announced its first takeover attempt on 19 January 2006, offering US$500 million (₹20 billion) in cash for the airline. Market reaction to the deal was mixed, with many analysts suggesting that Jet Airways was paying too much for Air Sahara. The Indian Civil Aviation Ministry gave approval in principle, but the deal was eventually called off over disagreements over price and the appointment of Jet chairman Naresh Goyal to the Air Sahara board. Following the failure of the deal, the companies filed lawsuits seeking damages from each other

A second, eventually successful attempt was made on 12 April 2007 with Jet Airways agreeing to pay ₹14.50 billion ($340 million). The deal gave Jet a combined domestic market share of about 32%.

On 16 April Jet Airways announced that Air Sahara will be renamed as Jetlite. The takeover was officially completed on 20 April, when Jet Airways paid ₹4 billion.

=== Rebranding to JetKonnect ===
Jetlite was merged with Jet Airways' in-house low-cost brand JetKonnect on 25 March 2012 as a move towards operating under one brand. On 1 December 2014 JetKonnect was integrated into Jet Airways ending its own operations and now flew for them under the codeshare, using its own Air Operators Certificate and flight code S2 till the merger of the two companies was completed after approval. The aircraft fleet was also progressively being repainted in Jet Airways livery.

=== End of Operations ===
On 17 April 2019, JetLite grounded all of its flights and ceased all operations, in tandem with its parent company, Jet Airways, which also grounded all of its flights and ceased all operations on the same day.

== Services ==
JetLite had an extensive domestic network, as well as international services to Nepal and Sri Lanka that were dropped after the merger with JetKonnect, focusing only on domestic routes.

A buy onboard menu called JetCafé with food for purchase was offered in Economy, while free meals were offered in Business class.

== Corporate Affairs ==
=== Business Trends ===
The key trends for Jet Lite (India) Limited ('Jet Lite') over recent years are shown below (as at year ending 31 March):

	2010	2011	2012	2013	2014
Revenue (₹: INR lakhs (Note: 1 lakh = 100,000))	157,947	178,615	190,386	201,136	176,364
Profits (₹: INR lakhs)	4,619	−10,747	−18,403	−29,523	−42,931
Departures	39,602	39,003	41,992	38,160	31,986
Load Factor (%)	75.0	79.2	77.9	74.8	72.7
Number of aircraft (at year end)	25	19	19	15	12
Notes/sources					

== Fleet ==
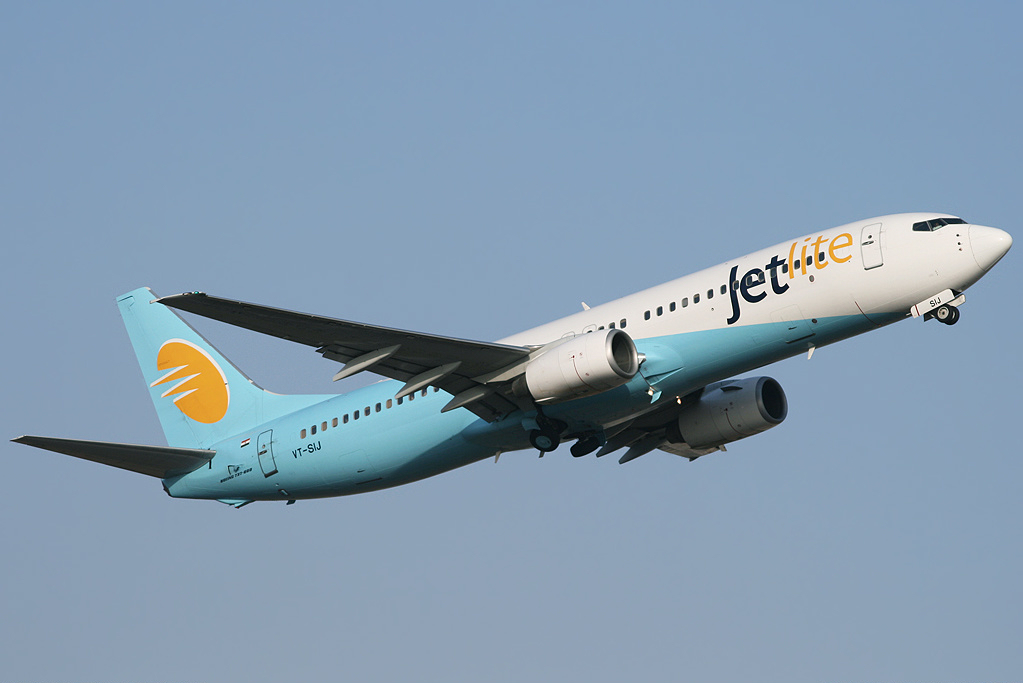
Jetlite Boeing 737-800

As of April 2019, JetLite operated the following all-Boeing 737 Next Generation fleet (until the merger with Jetkonnect):

JetLite fleet
Aircraft	In service	Orders	Passengers	Notes
Boeing 737–700	3	—		—
Boeing 737–800	5	—		—
Total	8	—		

== In-flight services ==
JetLite had a buy on board service called JetCafé, offering food for purchase in Economy, while free meals were offered in Business class.

== See also ==
- Jet Airways
