= Guiscard =

- Commune
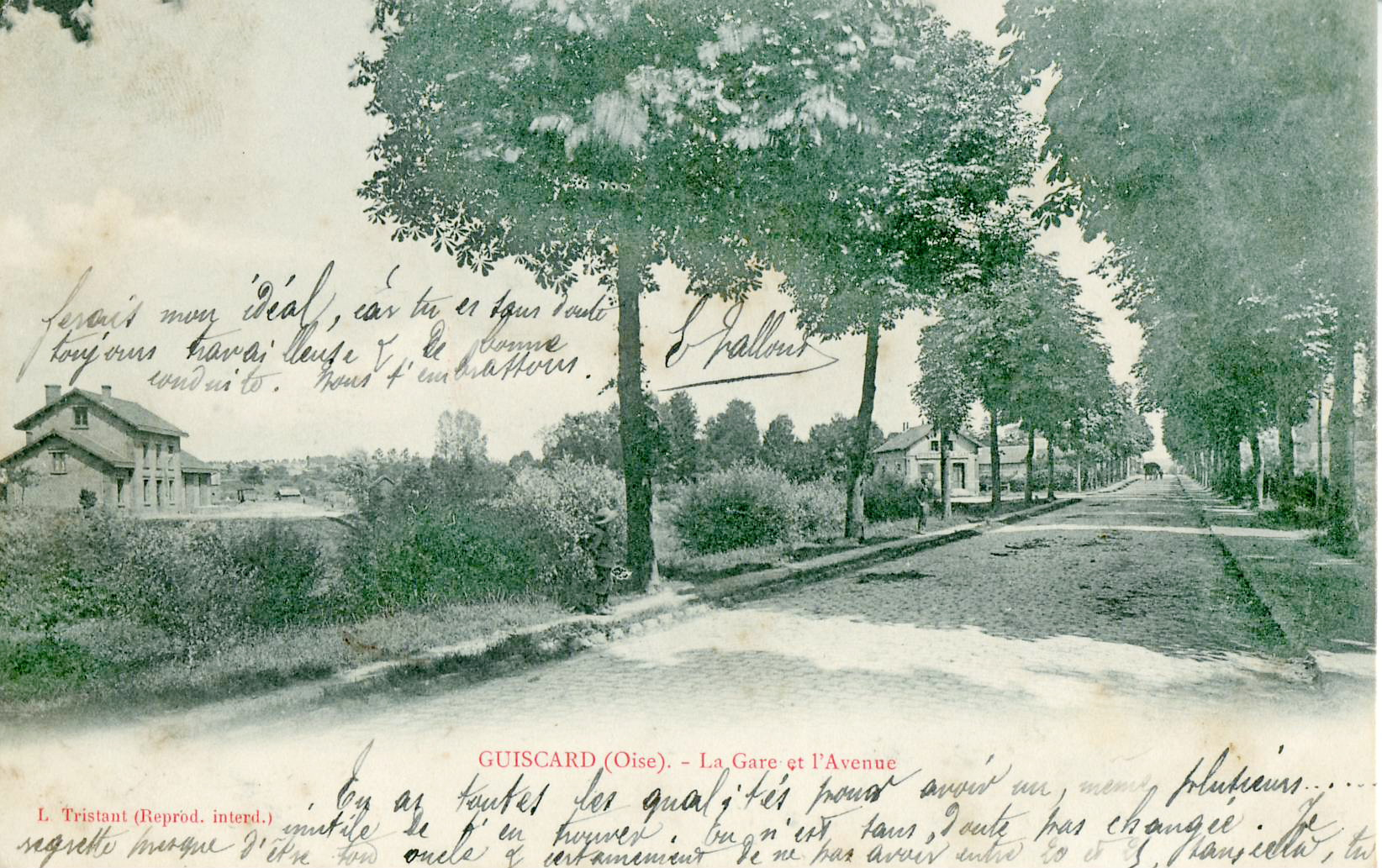
- The railway station and avenue in Guiscard

- Coat of arms
- Location of Guiscard
- Location within France Location within Hauts-de-France
- Coordinates: 49°39′24″N 3°03′09″E
- Country: France
- Region: Hauts-de-France
- Department: Oise
- Arrondissement: Compiègne
- Canton: Noyon
- Intercommunality: Pays Noyonnais

Government
  - Mayor (2020–2026): Thibault Delavenne
- Area^{1}: 20.49 km^{2} (7.91 sq mi)
- Elevation: 62 m (203 ft)
- Highest elevation: 104 m (341 ft)
- Lowest elevation: 49 m (161 ft)
- Population (2023): 1,749
  - Density: 85.36/km^{2} (221.1/sq mi)
- Time zone: UTC+01:00 (CET)
  - Summer (DST): UTC+02:00 (CEST)
- INSEE/Postal code: 60291 /60640
- ^{1} French Land Register data, which excludes lakes, ponds, glaciers > 1 km^{2} (0.386 sq mi or 247 acres) and river estuaries.

Guiscard (French pronunciation: [ɡiskaʁ]) is a commune in the Oise department in northern France.

== See also ==
- Communes of the Oise department
