= Guillaume Giscard d'Estaing =

Guillaume Giscard d'Estaing (born 1958) has been chairman and CEO of Sofema since 2007.

== Career ==
After an initial career as a naval officer and helicopter pilot, Guillaume Giscard d'Estaing entered Turbomeca (Snecma group) based in Pau in 1994 as Sales Manager and, later, marketing director. In addition to new equipment, the engine retrofit activity (successive changes of a standard model by return to factory) would later inform his thinking on the future of extending the life of equipment and the new direction of Sofema. From 2000 to 2004 in the UK, Giscard d'Estaing managed three separate companies - Turbomeca UK, and the joint ventures Rolls-Royce Turbomeca and Rolls-Royce Snecma. With these jobs, he was confronted with Franco-British cooperation, strategic negotiations with prestigious boards, maintaining close contact with customers and users.

In 2004, Guillaume Giscard d'Estaing joined Snecma headquarters in France as deputy director of International Affairs for European countries and, when the group merged with Sagem, he became Deputy Vice President of International Development of the new entity Safran.

In 2007 Guillaume Giscard d'Estaing succeeded General Bernard Norlain as president of Sofema - then specialized in supplying export support to large French aeronautic and defense groups.

He implemented a profound transformation of the company, which is today focused on the renovation and sale of military and civil equipment to countries with lower purchasing power and a reasoned development policy.

This successful reorientation is based on Guillaume Giscard d'Estaing's belief that Sofema's new activity must strengthen French economic presence in these countries through balanced and sustainable partnerships.
