= Naresh Goyal =

Non-resident Indian businessman

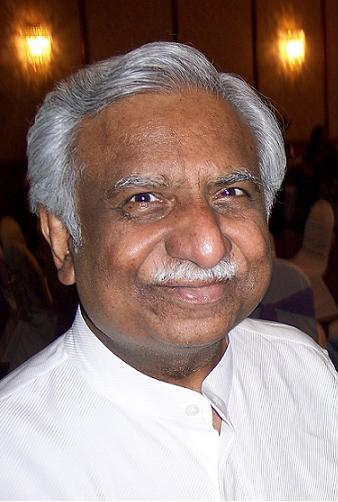
- Born: 29 July 1949 (age 77); Sangrur, Punjab, Dominion of India
- Occupation: Former Chairman of Jet Airways
- Years active: 1967 – present
- Children: 2

Naresh Goyal (born 29 July 1949) is an Indian businessman who is the founder and Chairman of Jet Airways. He started operating Jet Airways in 1993 with initial seed money from Tail Winds incorporated, Isle of Man. Following the 2005 IPO of Jet Airways, Forbes magazine declared him the 16th richest person in India, with a net worth of US$1.9 billion.

== Early life ==
Naresh Goyal was born in Sangrur, Punjab in 1949 in the house of a jewellery dealer. His father died when he was a child. He studied up to sixth standard at Govt. Raj High School for Boys. When he was eleven years old, his family went through an economic crisis and his house was auctioned. He then lived with his mother's uncle. Goyal holds a Bachelor of Commerce degree from Govt. Bikram College of Commerce, Patiala.

== Career ==
In 1967, Goyal began his career as a cashier in his maternal uncle Seth Charan Das Ram Lal's travel agency, East West Agencies, at a starting salary of Rs 300 a month. After graduating in Commerce, Goyal joined the travel business with the GSA for Lebanese International Airlines.

From 1967 to 1974, he underwent extensive training in the travel business through his association with several foreign airlines. He travelled overseas extensively on business during this period.

In 1969, he was appointed the public relations manager of Iraqi Airways and from 1971 to 1974 was the regional manager for ALIA, Royal Jordanian Airlines. He also worked with the Indian offices of Middle East Airlines (MEA), where he gained experience in various areas including ticketing, reservations and sales. in 1974, with £500 from his mother, he set up his own agency named Jetair, representing the likes of Air France, Austrian Airlines and Cathay Pacific.

In 1975, he was appointed regional manager of Philippines Airlines in India.

Naresh Goyal stepped down from the Board of Jet Airways along with his wife Anita Goyal on 25 March 2019 amid a financial crisis in the airline and after two-thirds of the fleet grounded.

He was stopped from flying away in 2019.

== Money laundering ==
In September 2019, the Enforcement Directorate questioned Goyal for investigating charges of foreign exchange violation against him. He was detained and questioned for money laundering by the ED in 2020.

=== September 2023 arrest ===
Goyal was arrested by the ED in September 2023 after questioning him for 8 to 10 hours. An FIR had been filed against Goyal based on a complaint by Canara Bank.

== Jet Airways ==
In 1993, Goyal took advantage of the opening of the Indian economy by the Congress government led by P. V. Narasimha Rao, the then Prime Minister of India and the enunciation of the Open Skies Policy by the Government of India to set up Jet Airways for the operation of scheduled air services on domestic sectors in India. Jet Airways commenced commercial operations on 5 May 1993. Goyal founded Jet Airways (Private) Limited with the objective of providing sales and marketing representation to foreign airlines in India.

Goyal served on the board of the International Air Transport Association (IATA) from 2004–2006. He was re-elected in 2010 with his tenure extending until June 2016. Naresh Goyal stepped down from the Board of Jet Airways on 25 March 2019 along with his wife.

== Personal life ==
Goyal met his wife, Anita, after she joined the company in 1979 as a marketing analyst and rose to become the head of marketing and sales. They married nine years later. The couple together have a daughter and a son. Anita died in Mumbai aged 70 following a long battle with cancer in May, 2025.

== Awards ==
| Award | Year |
|---|---|
| Entrepreneur of the Year Award for Services from Ernst & Young | September 2010 |
| Distinguished Alumni Award-2000 for meritorious and distinguished performance as an entrepreneur | October 2000 |
| Outstanding Asian-Indian award for leadership and contribution to the global community given by the Indian American Centre for Political Awareness | November 2003 |
| Aerospace Laurels for outstanding contribution in the field of Commercial Air Transport | April 2000 and February 2004 |
| The first BML Munjal Award for Excellence in Learning & Development in the Private Sector category | 6 January 2006 |
| NDTV Profit Business Award 2006 | 28 July 2006 |
| Accorded the TATA AIG – Lifetime Achievement Award | 8 September 2007 |
| Travel Entrepreneur of the Year award at the 19th annual TTG (Travel Trade Gazette) Travel Awards | 25 October 2007 |
| Man of the Year Award by the Aviation Press Club (APC) | 9 April 2008 |
| Business Person of the Year award by UK Trade & Investment at the India Business Awards 2008 | 9 September 2008 |
| CNBC TV18 India Business Leader Awards | 22 January 2009 |
| International Entrepreneurs of the Year by the readers of Asian Voice | 27 February 2009 |
| Lifetime Achievement Award of the Year by the Travel Agents Association of India (TAAI) | August 2010 |
| Hall of Fame honour from Hotel Investment Forum of India 2011 | January 2011 |
| Belgium conferred the Commandeur of the Order of Leopold II, one of the country's highest civilian distinctions | November 2011 |
| Amity Leadership Award for Business Excellence | October 2012 |
